= List of Hawaii suffragists =

This is a list of Hawaii suffragists, suffrage groups and others associated with the cause of women's suffrage in Hawaii.

== Groups ==
- Maui Women's Suffrage Association, formed in 1919.
- National American Woman Suffrage Association (NAWSA).
- National Women's Equal Suffrage Association of Hawai'i (WESAH), formed in 1912.
- Women's Christian Temperance Union (WCTU).

== Suffragists ==
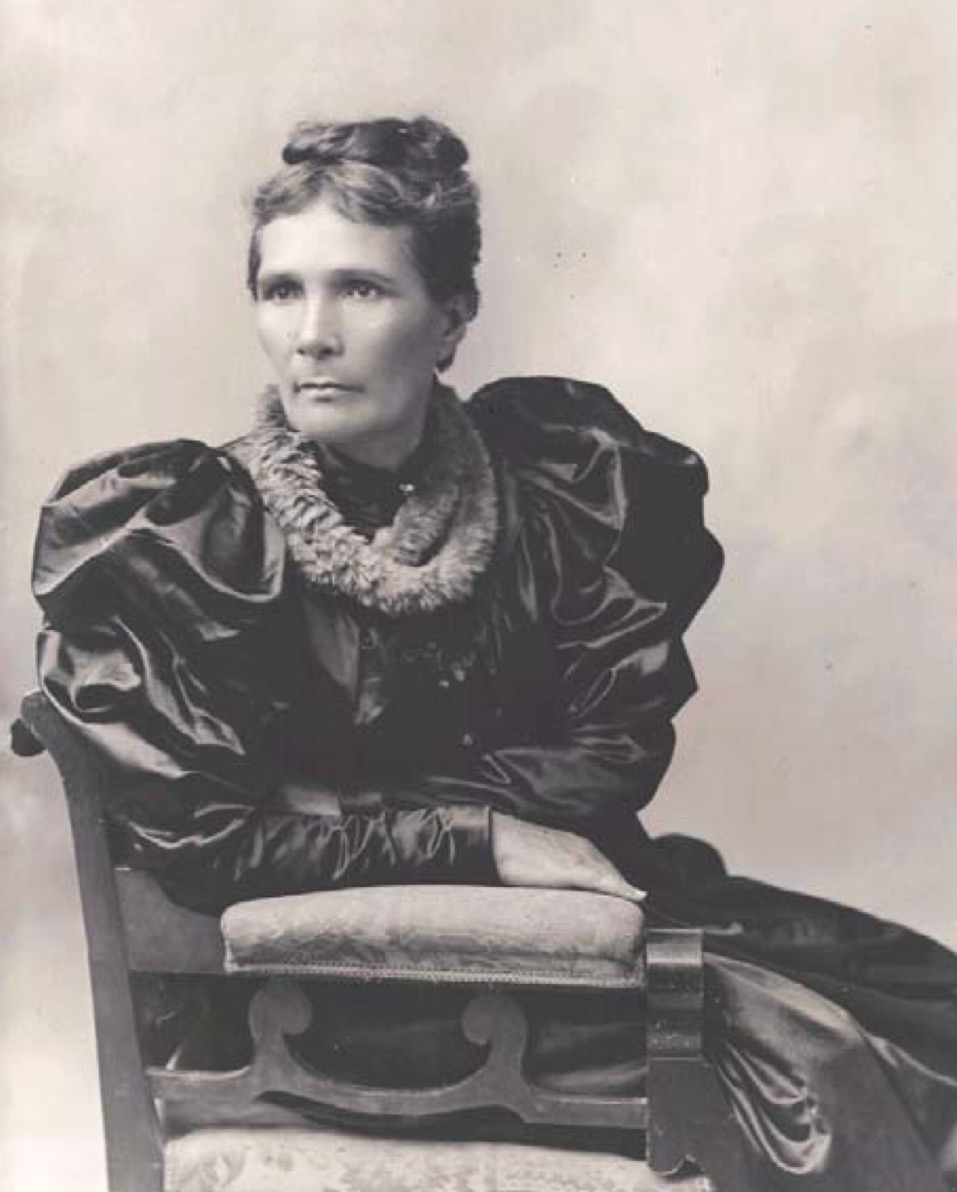
Emma Nakuina (c. 1904)

- Akaiko Akana.
- Mary Kinimaka Ha'aheo Atcherley.
- Ethel Frances Baldwin.
- Mary Tenney Castle.
- Wilhelmine Kekelaokalaninui Widemann Dowsett.
- Mary E. Dillingham Frear.
- Elizabeth Kahanu Kalaniana'ole.
- Margaret Knepper.
- Emilie K. Widemann Macfarlane.
- Louise MacMillan.
- Emma Nakuina.
- Emma Nāwahī.
- Emma Ahuena Taylor.
- Lahilahi Webb.

=== Politicians in support of women's suffrage ===
- Charles J. McCarthy.
- Joseph Nāwahī.
- William Pūnohu White.
- John E. Bush.
- Jonah Kūhiō Kalanianaʻole.

== Suffragists who campaigned in Hawaii ==
- Carrie Chapman Catt.
- Almira Hollander Pitman.

== Anti-suffragists in Hawaii ==
Groups

- Massachusetts Association Opposed to the Further Extension of Suffrage to Women.

== See also ==
- Timeline of women's suffrage in Hawaii
- Women's suffrage in Hawaii
- Women's suffrage in states of the United States
- Women's suffrage in the United States
