= Timeline of women's suffrage in Hawaii =

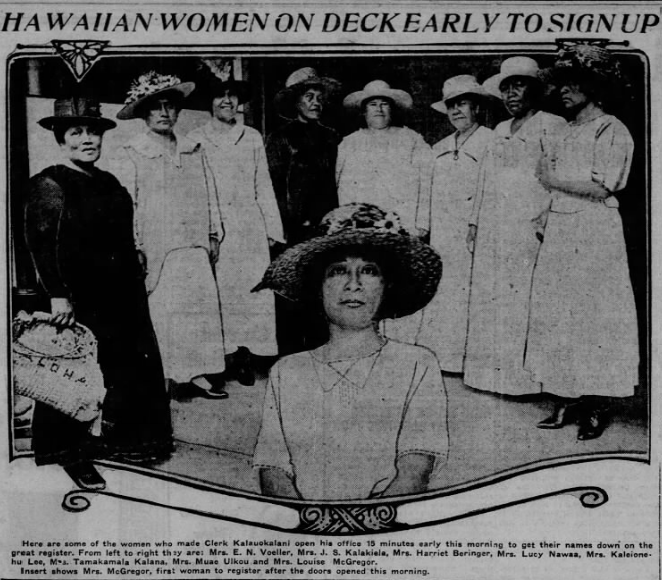
Hawaiian Women On Deck Early To Sign Up, August 30, 1920

This is a timeline of women's suffrage in Hawaii. Hawaii went through a transition where it was first the Kingdom of Hawaii, then a political coup overthrew Queen Liliʻuokalani in 1893. Women were not allowed to vote and lost political power in the provisional government. In the same year as the coup, Wilhelmina Kekelaokalaninui Widemann Dowsett and Emma Kaili Metcalf Beckley Nakuina began to make plans to support women's suffrage efforts. When Hawaii was annexed, members of the National American Woman Suffrage Association (NAWSA) advocated for women's suffrage for the territory. In 1912, Dowsett and a diverse group of women created the National Women's Equal Suffrage Association of Hawaiʻi (WESAH). In 1915 and 1916 Prince Jonah Kūhiō Kalanianaʻole brought women's suffrage petitions to the United States Congress, but no action was taken. In 1919, suffragists from WESAH fought for women's suffrage in the territorial legislature, but were also unsuccessful. Women in Hawaii gained the right to vote when the Nineteenth Amendment became part of the United States Constitution on August 26, 1920.

== 19th century ==
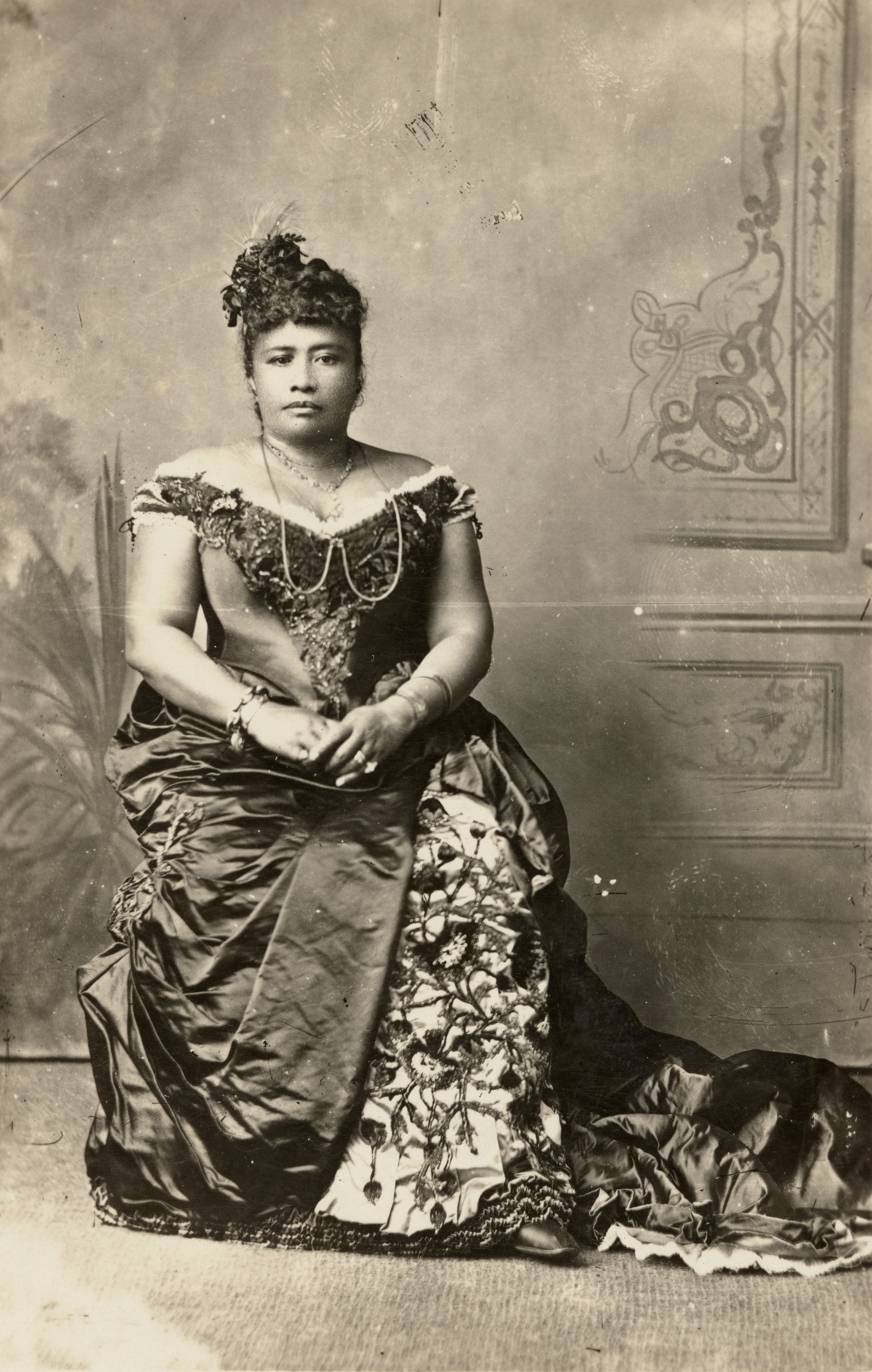
Queen Liliʻuokalani

=== 1890s ===
1890

- Representatives William Pūnohu White and John Bush work to amend the constitution for women's suffrage.

1892

- Joseph Nāwahī also puts forward women's suffrage legislation.

1893

- Queen Liliʻuokalani is deposed in a coup d'état that creates a provisional government.
- Women lose many political rights under the provisional government, including voting rights.
- Hui Aloha ʻĀina o Na Wahine (Hawaiian Women's Patriotic League) was founded to oppose the overthrow and annexation, on March 27, 1893, by Emilie Widemann Macfarlane and later led by Abigail Kuaihelani Campbell.

1894

- A Woman Suffrage Committee of the Women's Christian Temperance Union (WCTU) works to get the Hawaii constitutional convention delegates to support women's suffrage.

1899

- Susan B. Anthony and members of the National American Woman Suffrage Association (NAWSA) write the "Hawaiian Appeal" requesting that the U.S. Congress give women equal suffrage rights.
- The annexation precludes the right of the territorial legislature to make decisions about suffrage.

== 20th century ==
=== 1910s ===
1912

- Around this period, Emma Kaili Metcalf Beckley Nakuina and Wilhelmina Kekelaokalaninui Widemann Dowsett begin to organize groups for women's suffrage in Hawaii.
- Carrie Chapman Catt visits Hawaii.
- National Women's Equal Suffrage Association of Hawaiʻi is formed.

1915

- Prince Jonah Kūhiō Kalanianaʻole brings a women's suffrage resolution for Hawaii to the United States Congress.

1916

- Prince Kūhiō brings another women's suffrage resolution to the U.S. Congress.

1917

- Almira Hollander Pitman visits Hawaii and speaks to the territorial legislature on women's suffrage.
- Prince Kūhiō brings a suffrage bill to the United States Congress so Hawaii can determine their own suffrage rules.
- June 1: Senator John F. Shafroth brings the suffrage bill to the floor of the Senate.
- September 15: The bill passes the Senate.

1918

- April 29: Maud Wood Park, Anna Howard Shaw and Pitman testify on Hawaii suffrage at the House Committee on Woman Suffrage.
- June: The suffrage bill passes into law and now Hawaii can make its own suffrage decisions in the territorial legislature.

1919

- March 4: Women's suffrage meeting held at the Hawaii Capitol.
- March 6: Second women's meeting for women's suffrage held at the Capitol.
- March 19: Suffrage demonstration held in Hilo.
- March 23: Mass demonstrations held at the House, with around 500 women of "various nationalities, of all age."

=== 1920s ===
1920

- August 26: The passage of the Nineteenth Amendment applies to territories, giving women the right to vote.
- August 30: The first women's voter registration drive takes place. The first woman to register was Johanna N. Wilcox.

== See also ==
- List of Hawaii suffragists
- Women in the Hawaii Territorial Legislature
- Women's suffrage in Hawaii
- Women's suffrage in states of the United States
- Women's suffrage in the United States
