= Women's suffrage in Hawaii =

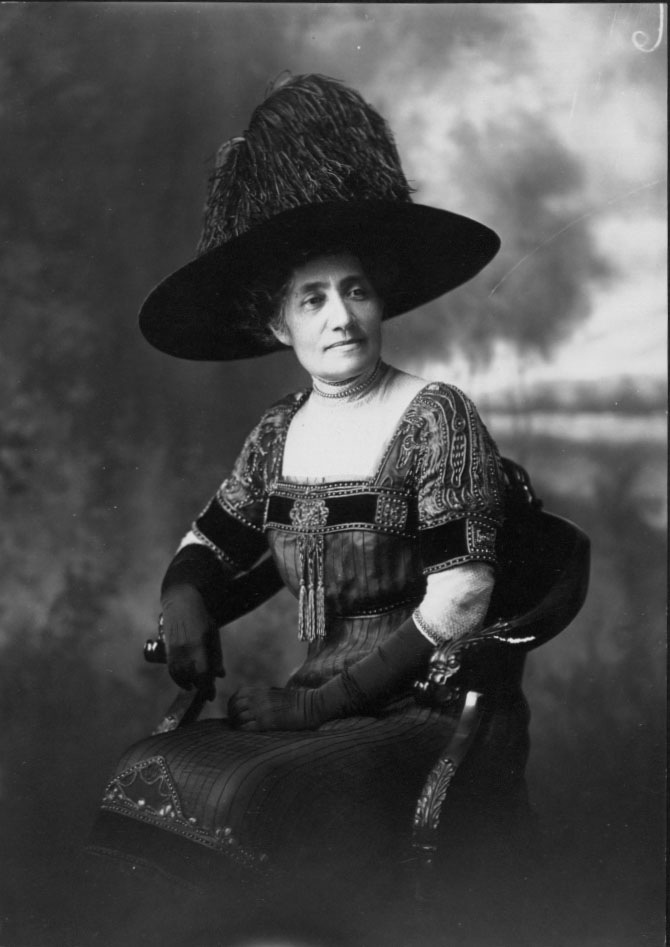
Wilhelmine Kekelaokalaninui Widemann Dowsett, leader of the women's suffrage movement in the 1910s and 1920s

Women's suffrage began in Hawaii in the 1890s. However, when the Hawaiian Kingdom ruled, women had roles in the government and could vote in the House of Nobles. After the overthrow of Queen Liliʻuokalani in 1893, women's roles were more restricted. Suffragists, Wilhelmine Kekelaokalaninui Widemann Dowsett and Emma Kaili Metcalf Beckley Nakuina, immediately began working towards women's suffrage. The Women's Christian Temperance Union (WCTU) of Hawaii also advocated for women's suffrage in 1894. As Hawaii was being annexed as a US territory in 1899, racist ideas about the ability of Native Hawaiians to rule themselves caused problems with allowing women to vote. Members of the National American Woman Suffrage Association (NAWSA) petitioned the United States Congress to allow women's suffrage in Hawaii with no effect. Women's suffrage work picked up in 1912 when Carrie Chapman Catt visited Hawaii. Dowsett created the National Women's Equal Suffrage Association of Hawaiʻi that year and Catt promised to act as the delegate for NAWSA. In 1915 and 1916, Prince Jonah Kūhiō Kalanianaʻole brought resolutions to the U.S. Congress requesting women's suffrage for Hawaii. While there were high hopes for the effort, it was not successful. In 1919, suffragists around Hawaii met for mass demonstrations to lobby the territorial legislature to pass women's suffrage bills. These were some of the largest women's suffrage demonstrations in Hawaii, but the bills did not pass both houses. Women in Hawaii were eventually franchised through the passage of the Nineteenth Amendment.

== Background ==
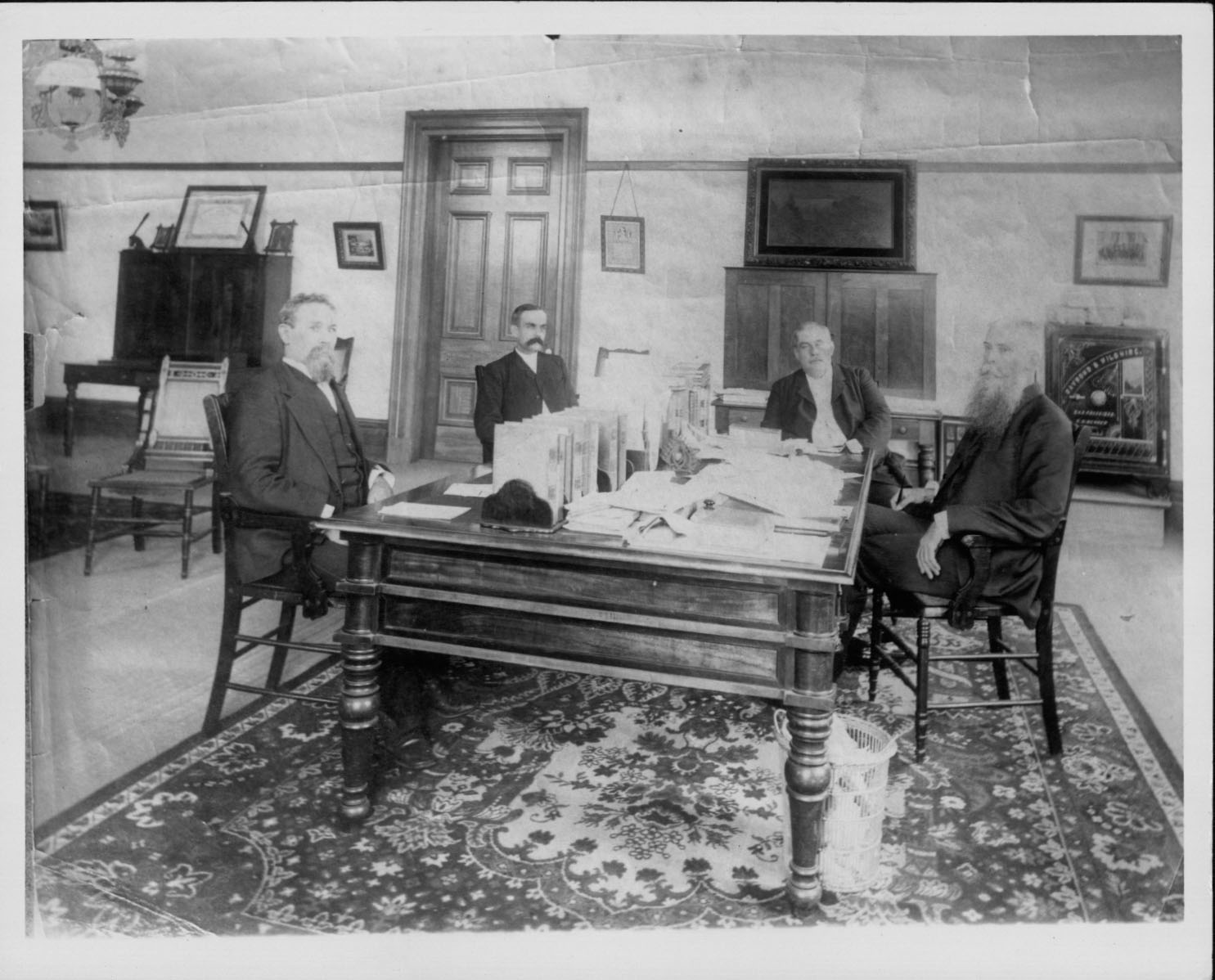
Hawaii Provisional Government Cabinet which overthrew the rule of Queen Lili'uokalani.

The Hawaiian Kingdom, established before the country was annexed by the United States in 1898, gave women important roles in the government. Women of the aliʻi class of nobility were given significant political power. The Kuhina Nui (premier) was a co-ruler position traditionally reserved for a female relative of the king. High-ranking chiefesses served as island governors and were able to vote and make laws in the House of Nobles. Four women of the Hawaiian nobility were listed as members of the House of Nobles in the 1840 Constitution of the Hawaiian Kingdom passed by King Kamehameha III.

The 1840 constitution did not explicitly deny common women the right to vote. It gave suffrage to the makaʻāinana, using the gender neutral Hawaiian term to refer to the populace. However, historians disagree about the true nature of women suffrage during this period and whether common women actually voted. From 1840 to 1850, the common people had the right to vote by petition to the king for members of the House of Representatives (all who were men). After the passage of the Act of July 30, 1850, voting was explicitly restricted to male citizens. Later constitutions in Hawaii, starting in 1852, only gave men the right to vote.

Queen Lili'uokalani ascended the throne as queen regnant of the kingdom in 1891. She worked to increase much of the lost political power of the monarchy. Women like judge Emma Kaili Metcalf Beckley Nakuina held important positions in the government that Queen Lili'uokalani oversaw until a coup d'état overthrew her rule in 1893 and installed a provisional government in Hawaii.

Women were barred from voting by the provisional government. In 1894, a Woman Suffrage Committee of the Women's Christian Temperance Union (WCTU) tried to persuade the Hawaii constitutional convention to allow women to vote. However, the proposition was rejected because it would increase the number of Native Hawaiians eligible to vote. Other barriers to voting included a proposed rule that voters must also be property owners.

Hawaii was annexed by the United States in July 1898. A territorial governor was established by the Organic Act of 1900.

== Suffrage efforts ==
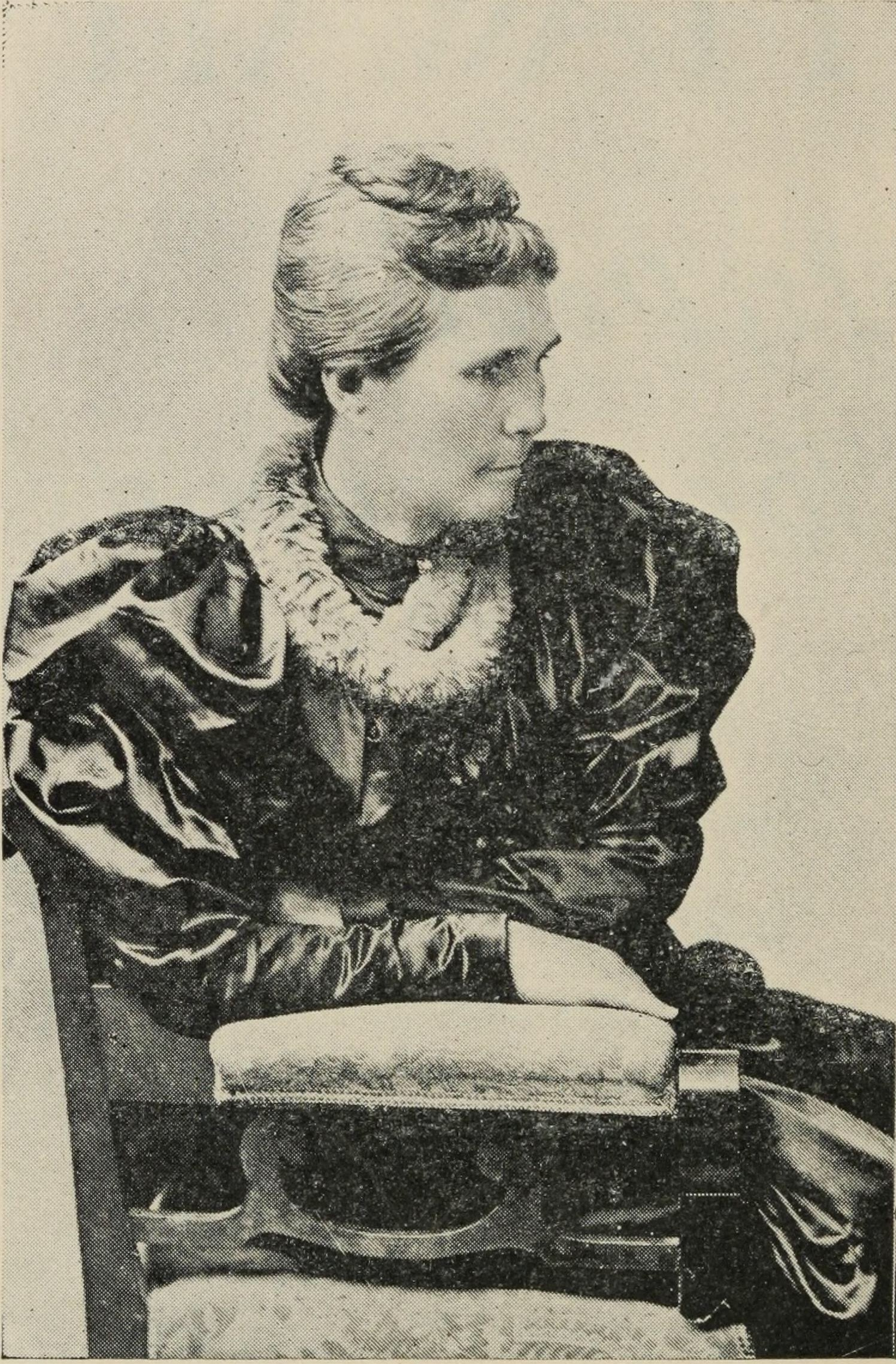
Emma Kaili Metcalf Beckley Nakuina (photographed c. 1904)

In 1890, during the reign of King Kalākaua, Representatives William Pūnohu White and John Bush worked to amend the constitution for women's suffrage. That effort did not work, but two years later during Lili'uokalani's reign, Representative Joseph Nāwahī again introduced another bill working towards women's suffrage. Had these efforts succeeded Hawaii would have been the first nation to grant women the right to vote before New Zealand in 1893. Nāwahī and White also worked as advisors for Queen Lili'uokalani.

White women in the Women's Christian Temperance Union (WCTU) were interested in bringing women's suffrage to Hawaii in the 1890s. Mary Tenney Castle was involved in the suffrage work in the WCTU. The WCTU in Hawaii allied themselves with white business owners and military groups that would later take control of the country. Native Hawaiian women and loyalists coalesced around the Hui Aloha ʻĀina o Na Wahine (Hawaiian Women's Patriotic League). It was founded to oppose the overthrow and support the deposed queen, on March 27, 1893, by Emilie Widemann Macfarlane. Under the leadership of Abigail Kuaihelani Campbell, the organization collected 21,000 signatures across the island chain opposing annexation in 1897. These efforts prevented the ratification of an annexation treaty but was unable to forestall Hawaii's annexation by a joint resolution of Congress in 1898.

The United States Congress began work on admitting Hawaii as a state in 1899. Susan B. Anthony, Elizabeth Cady Stanton, and others in the National American Woman Suffrage Association (NAWSA) wrote the "Hawaiian Appeal" in 1899. In this document, the suffragists asked that the United States Congress give women the same rights to vote as Hawaiian men are given in the territory. Anthony was partly motivated not only to help women's suffrage, but also to ensure that Native Hawaiian men would not be allowed to vote before women could. Anthony and Stanton also both felt that if territories were admitted without women's suffrage, it would make the overall battle for suffrage more difficult. In the end, suffrage was restricted to men who could read and write English or Hawaiian. In addition, the territorial legislature could not decide on suffrage on their own.

Women of Native Hawaiian descent, Nakuina and Wilhelmine Kekelaokalaninui Widemann Dowsett, began to organize for women's suffrage in Hawaii during this period. Emma 'Aima Ai'i Nāwahī worked to organize the Democratic Party in Hawaii in 1899. Dowsett founded the National Women's Equal Suffrage Association of Hawaiʻi (WESAH) in 1912. Carrie Chapman Catt helped the group become affiliated with NAWSA. After the formation of the WESAH, Catt helped the organization by representing them at the National Suffrage Conventions held by NAWSA and by staying in touch.

When Catt visited Hawaii to campaign for women's suffrage, her rhetoric of "native born" voters having supremacy over immigrants resonated with Native Hawaiians who had been colonized by immigrants. Suffragists in Hawaii also advocated for women's suffrage for immigrants from Asia living in Hawaii. The suffragists saw that there was a large group of second-generation immigrants from Asian countries that would soon be eligible to vote. Dowsett was behind the push for including Asian women in the Hawaii suffrage effort. Like many Native Hawaiian women leaders, she saw the value in organizing people from different backgrounds.

The major obstacle to female enfranchisement was the Organic Act which established the Territory of Hawaii and specifically forbid the territorial legislature from granting suffrage on the local level contrary to the federal constitution. In 1915, political parties in the territory asked their Delegate from the Territory, Prince Jonah Kūhiō Kalanianaʻole, to bring a bill to the U.S. Congress which requested the right for the territorial legislature to rule on women's suffrage. The Honolulu Star-Bulletin wrote an article that expressed the firm belief that Congress would take up the matter and allow the territory to decide women's suffrage issues on their own. Prince Kūhiō received no attention from Congress on the matter, but still brought the issue forward again in 1916. In 1917, New England suffragist Almira Hollander Pitman, who was married to the son of Hawaiian chiefess Kinoʻoleoliliha, visited Hawaii and spoke to the territorial legislature on women's suffrage and later used her influence to speed-up congressional action on the issue.

During World War I, suffragists in Hawaii helped the war effort by raising money and making garments. Women became involved in Red Cross work. Women such as Emilie K. Widemann Macfarlane and Emma Ahuena Davison Taylor were prominent in working on knitting units in Hawaii which made items of clothing for soldiers. The work of Hawaiians on the war effort was noticed by the press and President Woodrow Wilson.

In 1917 Prince Kūhiō brought a bill to the United States Congress which was put forward by Senator John F. Shaforth. The bill would allow the territory of Hawaii to make their own decisions about suffrage. In 1918 Pitman helped successfully advocate for the passage of that bill. Pitman used her own political contacts to help Prince Kūhiō. She, along with Maude Wood Park and Anna Howard Shaw testified in front of the House Committee on Woman Suffrage on April 29, 1918. The bill was passed and signed into law in June 1918.

In 1919, suffragists in Hawaii pushed the legislature for the right of women to be to vote in May 1919. Dowsett organized suffragists to meet at the Hawaii Capitol on March 4, 1919. Several hundred women were present in the Senate chamber when they passed an equal suffrage bill.

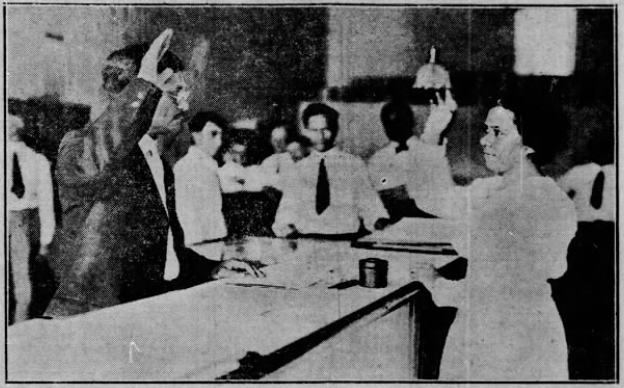
First woman to register to vote in Hawaii, Johanna Papaikaniau Wilcox, August 30, 1920.

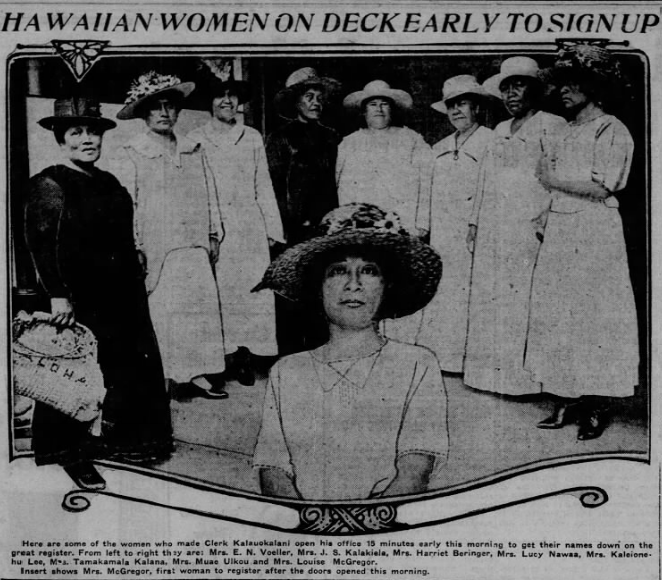
First group of women to register to vote in Hawaii, August 30, 1920

Again, Dowsett organized another demonstration when the House would vote on the bill on March 6. Governor Charles J. McCarthy and Princess Elizabeth Kahanu Kalanianaʻole both spoke in favor of women's suffrage at the rally. Reverend Akaiko Akana also expressed his support of the women's vote. Other present at the rally included Mary Dillingham Frear, Emilie K. Widemann Macfarlane, and Lahilahi Webb. Margaret Knepper, who had lived in California, discussed her own familiarity with voting as a woman.

Instead of passing the Senate bill, the House introduced a different bill that would send the women's suffrage question out as a voter referendum. To protest, suffragists staged demonstrations on March 23. Nearly 500 women of "various nationalities, all ages" poured into the House floor and convinced the representatives to hold a hearing on women's suffrage on March 24. Another demonstration took place in the evening of March 23 at A'ala Park.

Suffragists believed the legislature's effort to create a referendum instead of directly voting for women's suffrage was "mere camouflage" to disguise the fact that some representatives weren't sincere about giving women the vote. All suffrage bills were dead in the legislature by April 1919. Suffragists then turned to lobbying the U.S. Congress again through Prince Kūhiō.

The Nineteenth Amendment was ratified in 1920 and on August 26, 1920, the Secretary of State Bainbridge Colby ruled that it covered women in territories of the U.S. The first woman to register to vote in Hawaii was Johanna Papaikaniau Wilcox on August 30, 1920.

== Anti-suffragism in Hawaii ==
Many anti-suffrage arguments in Hawaii centered around racism. The white colonists of Hawaii argued that Native Hawaiians were incapable to self-rule. One anti-suffrage writer writing in 1917 worried about giving the vote to Japanese women who they saw having the ability to "overtake and outvote the other women considerably sooner" than other groups.

Anti-suffragists from the mainland also came to promote their cause in Hawaii. Members of the Massachusetts Association Opposed to the Extension of Suffrage to Women visited Hawaii.

== See also ==
- List of Hawaii suffragists
- Women in the Hawaii Territorial Legislature
- Timeline of women's suffrage in Hawaii
- Native Americans and women's suffrage in the United States
- Women's suffrage in states of the United States
- Women's suffrage in the United States
