= Women in the Hawaii Territorial Legislature =

The election of women to the Hawaii Territorial Legislature was a complex process. Women did not have the right to vote in the Republic of Hawaii after the overthrow of the Hawaiian Kingdom. Upon the passage of the Nineteenth Amendment to the United States Constitution, women gained suffrage almost immediately began seeking election to the Territorial Legislature, but the Hawaiian Organic Act dictated that only "a male citizen of the United States" could hold territorial office.

== Background ==
After the overthrow of the Hawaiian Kingdom by white businessmen in 1893, the new rulers barred women from voting in the elections of the new Republic of Hawaii. The overthrow therefore led to a reduction in the rights of women to be involved in government in Hawaii. Hawaiian culture historically involved a matriarchal understanding of power. Under the constitutional monarchy of the Hawaiian Kingdom prior to the overthrow, the common women could not vote but noble women could serve as ambassadors, judges, governors, and could become monarch.

Emma Nakuina and Wilhelmine Dowsett began organizing for women's suffrage shortly after the overthrow, with Dowsett founding the National Women's Equal Suffrage Association of Hawai'i in 1912. Continued suffrage organizing by a multi-ethnic group of women in Hawaii played a role in the eventual ratification of the Nineteenth Amendment to the United States Constitution on August 18, 1920, granting women the right to vote.

Very soon after the passage of the amendment, women began seeking election to the Hawaii Territorial Legislature. This had been understood as a part of the goal of the suffrage movement in Hawaii, influenced by the extent of women's political power prior to the overthrow.

== Initial campaigns and eligibility ==
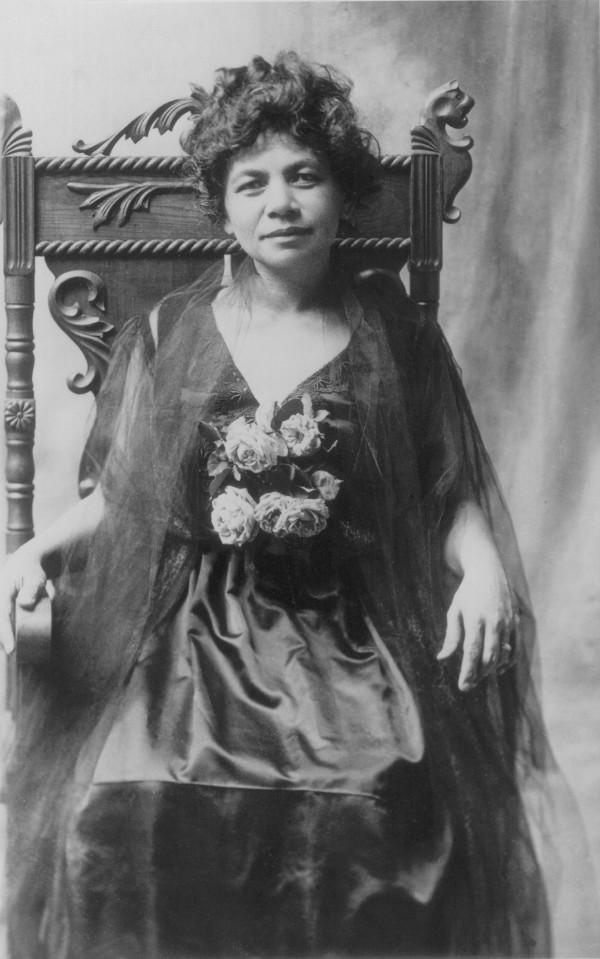
Mary Atcherley's campaigns helped prompt federal action to make women eligible for Hawaii office

Women who sought election to the Territorial Legislature immediately after the ratification of the 19th Amendment were apparently unaware that the amendment only gave them the right to vote, and not necessarily the right to hold elected office. In October 1920, Mary Haʻaheo Atcherley of Oahu was running for Territorial Senate as a Democrat, and Helen Sniffen of Maui was seeking a seat as well. Curtis P. Iaukea, then Territorial Secretary, did not believe he had the authority to remove the women's names from the ballot and deferred the issue to Attorney General Harry Irwin. Irwin ruled that the women's names could not legally be removed from the ballot, but also stated that they were not eligible for office under Section 24 of the Hawaiian Organic Act which stated that only "a male citizen of the United States" would have the right to hold territorial office.

In 1922, Atcherley once again campaigned for office; advice received by Territorial Governor Wallace Rider Farrington from the United States Department of the Interior, responsible for the administration of the Territory of Hawaii, aligned with Irwin's 1920 ruling. However, in June 1922, a bill modifying the Organic Act to allow women to hold office in Hawaii passed in the United States House of Representatives. On September 1, 1922, the bill passed in the United States Senate as well, with the President expected to sign shortly after. The bill's passage fulfilled a campaign promise by Harry A. Baldwin, Congressional delegate for the Territory of Hawaii; Atcherley's campaigns for office were noted as further impetus for the change. The bill prompted calls for prominent women in the territory to seek office, although as of September 2 it remained unclear whether they would be eligible for election, as President Warren G. Harding had not yet signed and the nomination deadline was September 7. Harding signed the bill into law on September 15, 1922.

== First successful elections of women ==
=== Rosalie Keliʻinoi ===
In 1925, Rosalie Keliʻinoi became the first woman in the Hawaii Territorial Legislature and specifically the Hawaii Territorial House of Representatives. She was elected as a Republican to represent Kapaʻa in 1924 after a previous unsuccessful campaign in 1922.

=== Elsie Wilcox ===
In 1933, Elsie Wilcox became the first woman in the Hawaii Territorial Senate.

== Further elections of women ==
Percentage of the Hawaii Territorial Legislature composed of women each year

== Disestablishment of Hawaii Territorial Legislature ==
The Hawaii Territorial Legislature adjourned for the final time on May 2, 1959, when Hawaii became a state and the Hawaii State Legislature therefore became its legislative body.
