= Kekelaokalani =

Kekela-o-kalani or Kekela was a common female name among members of the Hawaiian royal family:

- Kekelaokalani I of Hawaiʻi, daughter of King Keaweʻīkekahialiʻiokamoku and Queen Kalanikauleleiaiwi
- Kekelaokalani-a-Kauakahiakua, daughter of Kauakahiakua and Kekuiapoiwa I
- Fanny Kekelaokalani, mother of Queen Emma of Hawaii
- Wilhelmine Kekelaokalaninui Widemann Dowsett, 20th-century Hawaiian women suffragist
