= United States Senate Select Committee on Woman Suffrage =

The Select Committee on Woman Suffrage was a select committee of the United States Senate from 1882 to 1921. It was established to consider an amendment to the United States Constitution granting women the right to vote in the United States.

== History ==
The Senate established the select committee on January 9, 1882, when it approved a resolution offered by Senator George Hoar of Massachusetts. The committee was directed to consider "all petitions, bills, and resolves asking for the extension of suffrage to women or the removal of their legal disabilities." The first constitutional amendment granting woman suffrage was proposed January 10, 1878, by Senator Aaron Sargent of California. Similar amendments were introduced and referred to the select committee each successive Congress until 1919, when a resolution that was to become the 19th Amendment to the Constitution passed both houses of Congress.

The committee became a standing committee in 1909 when Senator Nelson Aldrich of Rhode Island submitted a resolution that had the effect of giving all current select committees, including Woman Suffrage, full committee status. The committee was abolished in 1921, along with many other obsolete committees.

Woman suffrage leader Susan B. Anthony testified before the select committee several times over the year, the last occurring in 1902.

== Chairmen ==
| Name | Party | State | Years |
| Elbridge G. Lapham | Republican | New York | 1882-1883 |
| Francis M. Cockrell | Democratic | Missouri | 1884-1889 |
| Zebulon B. Vance | Democratic | North Carolina | 1890-1892 |
| George Hoar | Republican | Massachusetts | 1893-1895 |
| James Z. George | Democratic | Mississippi | 1897 |
| James H. Berry | Democratic | Arkansas | 1898-1899 |
| John W. Daniel | Democratic | Virginia | 1900-1901 |
| Augustus O. Bacon | Democratic | Georgia | 1902-1907 |
| Alexander S. Clay | Democratic | Georgia | 1908-1910 |
| Lee S. Overman | Democratic | North Carolina | 1911-1912 |
| Charles S. Thomas | Democratic | Colorado | 1913-1916 |
| Andrieus A. Jones | Democratic | New Mexico | 1917-1918 |
| James E. Watson | Republican | Indiana | 1919-1921 |

== See also ==
- United States House Committee on Woman Suffrage
- Women's suffrage in the United States
