= David Leleo Kinimaka =

Hawaiian noble

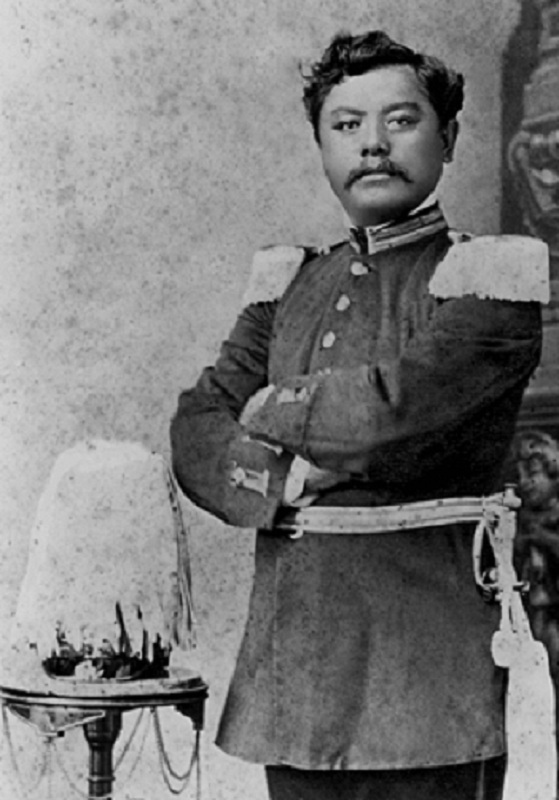
- Born: July 5, 1851; Palaueka, Holualoa, Hawaii
- Died: March 10, 1884 (aged 32); Kingdom of Hawaii
- Occupation: Kingdom of Hawaii military
- Spouse: Hannah Keolaokalaau
- Children: 5

David Leleo Kinimaka (July 5, 1851 – March 10, 1884) was a descendant of Hawaiian nobility and the hānai (adopted) brother to King Kalākaua. Kinimaka was a member of the Royal Guards of Hawaii during the reigns of Kamehameha V and Lunalilo until the 1873 mutiny at ʻIolani Barracks. He later became a member of Kalākaua's Privy Council of State and a commissioned officer in his King's Guards. In 2013, hundreds of his descendants from around the world gathered at Iolani Palace for a family reunion.

== Background ==
He was born July 5, 1851, at Palaueka, Holualoa, Hawaii, and was hānai half-brother to King Kalākaua. The practice of hānai within the Hawaiian culture is an informal adoption between closely connected families. Kalakaua's hānai parents were Keaweamahi Kinimaka and his first wife High Chiefess Haʻaheo Kaniu. After Haʻaheo Kaniu died, Keaweamahi Kinimaka married Pai, a descendant of Tahitian royalty. She gave birth to David Leleo, a daughter Haʻaheo Kaniu and another son Kaikala. The daughter Haʻaheo Kaniu married William P. Lumaheihei (or Ulumaheihei) who became a member of Kalakaua’s staff.

His paternal grandparents were High Chief Kapiiwi of Kaʻū and High Chiefess Kahikoloa of Maui. Kahikoloa (with Kameʻeiamoku) was mother to Hoʻolulu, who, along with his half-brother Hoapili, helped conceal the bones of King Kamehameha I in a secret hiding place after the ruler's death.

Kinimaka was educated by Archdeacon George Mason, of the Anglican Church of Hawaii, at the St. Alban's College on Oahu, and at Luaʻehu School, in Lahaina, Maui. These institutions were a precursor of the present-day ʻIolani School in Honolulu. His classmates included Leleiohoku II (Kalākaua's younger brother), Curtis P. Iaukea, Samuel Nowlein, Robert Hoapili Baker, and other future Hawaiian leaders.

== Career ==
Kinimaka joined the Royal Guards of Hawaii during the reign of Kamehameha V, who constructed the ʻIolani Barracks in 1870 to house the troops. During the reign of Lunalilo, the guards numbered about 70 men. On September 7, 1873, a mutiny of the troops resulted from what they believed were draconian disciplinary actions by Captain Joseph Jajczay and adjutant general Charles Hastings Judd. Lunalilo ordered the men to resume their duties or leave the premises, or to voluntarily be dismissed by surrendering their weapons. Kinimaka was the first to leave the ranks and lay down his rifle. Kalākaua, who was on the military staff of Lunalilo at the time, was suspected to have incited the native guards to rebel against their white officers. Lunalilo responded to the insurrection by disbanding the military unit altogether, leaving Hawaii without a standing army for the remainder of his reign.

Kinimaka was later employed as a guard at Oahu Prison. After the mutiny and the disbanding of the troops, Lunalilo died five months later. Kalākaua was elected as Lunalilo's successor. After coming to the throne, Kalākaua reorganized the troops as the King's Guards. Kinimaka returned and was promoted to brevet lieutenant colonel.

On September 1, 1880, he was appointed to Kalākaua's Privy Council of State, and in 1883, made a member of the Board of Education. On the occasion of the king's 1883 coronation ceremony, Kalākaua conferred the Royal Order of the Crown of Hawaii on Kinimaka. In October 1883, King Milan I of Serbia conferred the Knight Companion of the Royal Order of Takovo on him. In December 1883, the king of Siam Chulalongkorn conferred upon Kinimaka the Knight Companion of the Crown of Siam.

== Personal life and death ==
Kinimaka married Hannah Keolaokalaau or Hanakeola (1854–1893) on June 11, 1874. They were the parents of daughters Mary, Alice, Rebecca and Fannie, and son Mathias.

He died in a fall from his horse on March 10, 1884, on the road to Kaumalumalu, Hawaii. His funeral was presided over by Anglican minister Alexander Mackintosh, and held at the barracks of the household troops on March 16. The funeral procession marched to Kawaihao cemetery for burial. Under normal circumstances, a person of Kinimaka's stature would have drawn a sizeable public turnout lining the streets. On this day, however, the public's attention was directed towards King Kalākaua's return to Oahu.

In 2013, four hundred descendants of Kinimaka congregated at Iolani Palace in Honolulu to celebrate Hawaiian culture, and the family legacy.

== Bibliography ==
- Allen, Helena G. (1982). The Betrayal of Liliuokalani: Last Queen of Hawaii, 1838–1917. Glendale, CA: A. H. Clark Company. ISBN 978-0-87062-144-4. OCLC 9576325.
- Allen, Helena G. (1995). Kalakaua: Renaissance King. Honolulu: Mutual Publishing. ISBN 978-1-56647-059-9. OCLC 35083815.
- Biographical Sketch of His Majesty King Kalakaua. Honolulu: P. C. Advertiser Steam Printing Office. 1884. pp. 72–74. OCLC 12787107.
- Dibble, Sheldon (1843). History of the Sandwich Islands. Lahainaluna: Press of the Mission Seminary. OCLC 2145112.
- Kuykendall, Ralph Simpson (1953). The Hawaiian Kingdom 1854–1874, Twenty Critical Years. Vol. 2. Honolulu: University of Hawaii Press. ISBN 978-0-87022-432-4. OCLC 47010821.
- McKinzie, Edith Kawelohea (1983). Stagner, Ishmael W. (ed.). Hawaiian Genealogies: Extracted from Hawaiian Language Newspapers. Vol. 1. Honolulu: University of Hawaii Press. ISBN 0-939154-28-5. OCLC 12555087.
- McKinzie, Edith Kawelohea (1986). Stagner, Ishmael W. (ed.). Hawaiian Genealogies: Extracted from Hawaiian Language Newspapers. Vol. 2. Honolulu: University of Hawaii Press. ISBN 978-0-939154-37-1. OCLC 12555087.
- Pogány, András H. (1963). "Joseph Jajczay, Captain of the Hawaiian King's Bodyguard". The Hungarian Quarterly. 4 (1–2). Budapest: 53–61. OCLC 18822542.
