= Emilie Widemann Macfarlane =

Native Hawaiian activist (1859–1947)

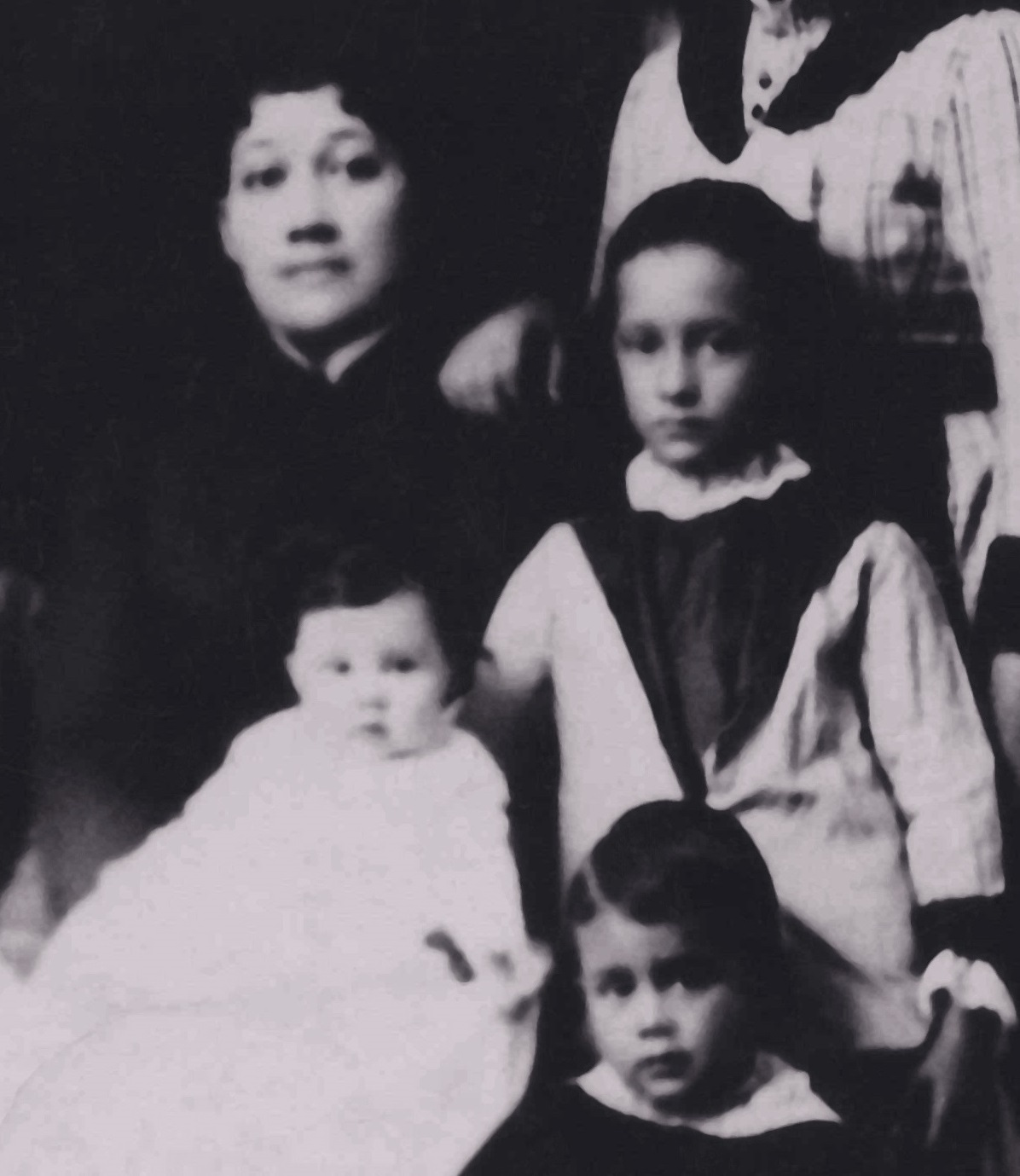
- Macfarlane; her two children, Alice and Walter; and her niece, Gardie Macfarlane, 1886
- Born: Emilie Kekāuluohi Widemann; October 3, 1859; Lihue, Kauai
- Died: March 13, 1947 (aged 87); Queen's Hospital, Honolulu, Oahu
- Resting place: Oahu Cemetery
- Spouse: Frederick W. Macfarlane
- Children: 3
- Parent(s): Hermann A. Widemann; Mary Kaumana Pilahiuilani

Emilie Kekāuluohi Widemann Macfarlane (October 3, 1859 – March 13, 1947) was a Native Hawaiian activist and civic organizer during the late 19th and early 20th centuries She was known for her charitable work and civic involvement in Honolulu, including women's suffrage, public health, education, and the preservation of Hawaii's historical legacy.

Macfarlane was born of German and Native Hawaiian descent, and her family were connected to the aliʻi (nobility) class of the Hawaiian Kingdom. She married Hawaiian-born British businessman Frederick W. Macfarlane and had three children.

In 1893, shortly after the overthrow of the Hawaiian Kingdom, Macfarlane was elected the first president of Hui Aloha ʻĀina for Women, an organization formed in opposition to the deposition of Queen Liliʻuokalani and efforts to annex the islands to the United States. Macfarlane resigned after a few weeks in office after a subsequent rift with members of the organization. In 1895, she co-founded the Hawaiian Relief Society to assist the victims of a cholera epidemic in Honolulu. After Hawaii's annexation to the United States in 1898, Macfarlane led knitting circles for Hawaiian servicemen during World War I and supported her sister Wilhelmine Dowsett's campaign for women's suffrage in the Territory of Hawaii.

== Early life and family ==
Macfarlane was born on October 3, 1859, in Lihue on the island of Kauai to German immigrant and businessman Hermann A. Widemann and his Hawaiian wife, Mary Kaumana Pilahiuilani. Her mother was descended from the aliʻi (nobility) class of the Hawaiian Kingdom, and her mother's grandfather, Kalawa, was a retainer and close associate of the aliʻi of Kauai. Macfarlane's father was a prominent politician in the Hawaiian Kingdom and a cabinet minister of the last queen, Liliʻuokalani.

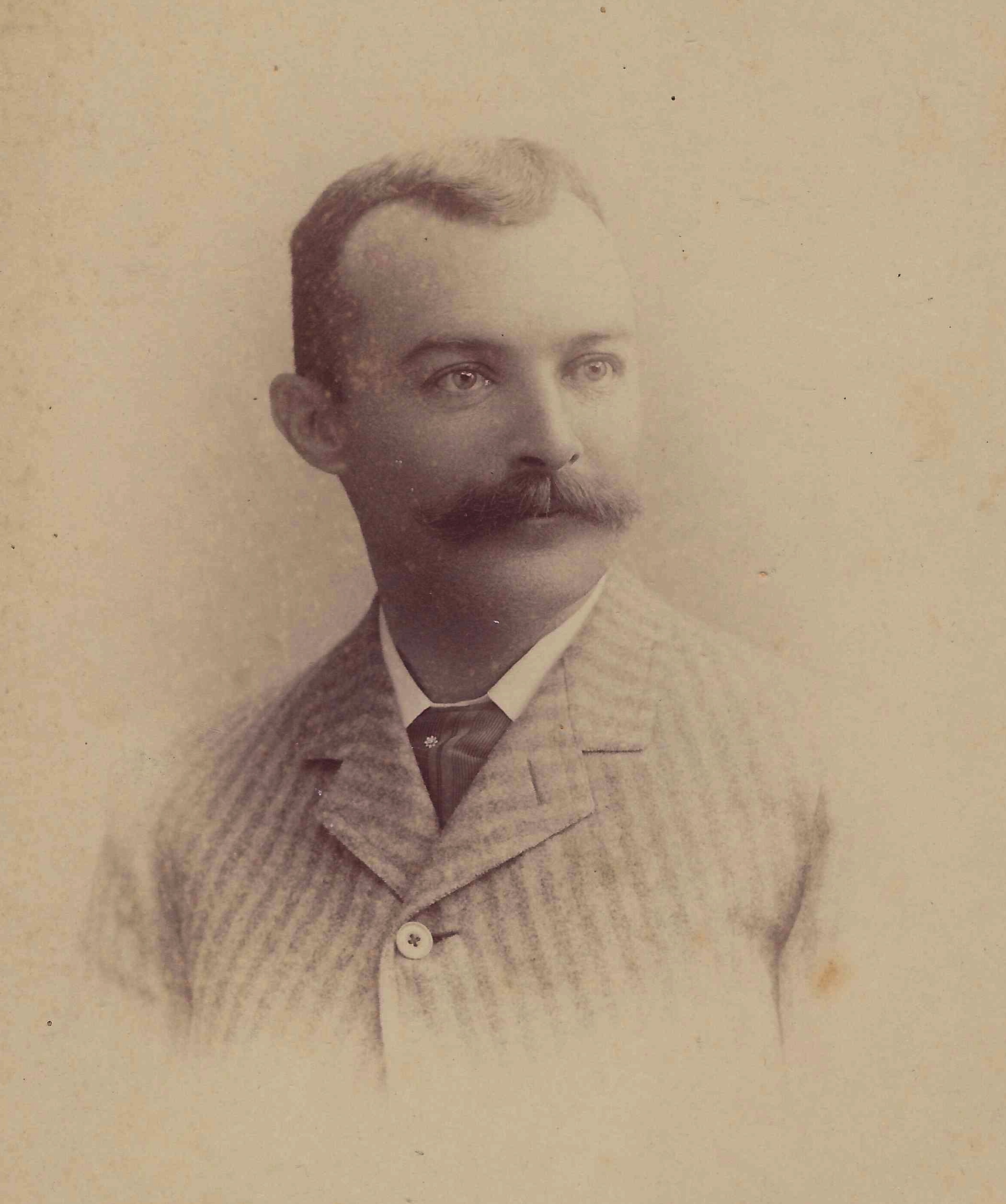
Frederick W. Macfarlane

On April 5, 1879, Emilie and Hawaiian-born British businessman Frederick Washington Macfarlane (1854–1929) married in Waikiki. The Macfarlanes, like the Widemanns, were well connected in Hawaiian society. Frederick Macfarlane was a younger brother of George W. Macfarlane (the last chamberlain of King Kalākaua) and Edward C. Macfarlane, who was Queen Liliʻuokalani's cabinet minister in 1892.

They had three children: Frederick Walter Kalaninuikukailimoku Macfarlane (1882–1953), Guy E. Kalanimalokuloku-i-kepoookalani Macfarlane (1889–1961) and Hawaii Territorial legislator Walter James Macfarlane (1907–1943). Frederick married Alice Kamokilaikawai Campbell, and they had five children. Her daughter-in-law, Alice Kamokilaikawai Campbell, became a Hawaii Territorial senator and was active in the opposition to Hawaiian statehood.

Macfarlane was known as Auntie Mela by her extended family. Her eldest sister, Emma Kalanikauleleiwinuiamamao Widemann (1852–1931), was married to Frederick's eldest brother, Henry R. Macfarlane. Their younger sister, Wilhelmine Kekelaokalaninui Widemann Dowsett, was a suffragist who helped organize the National Women's Equal Suffrage Association of Hawaii in 1912—the first women's suffrage club in the Territory of Hawaii.

== Civic engagement ==
Macfarlane was known for her charitable work and civic involvement in Honolulu, including women's suffrage, public health, education, and the preservation of Hawaii's historical legacy.

=== Opposition to annexation ===
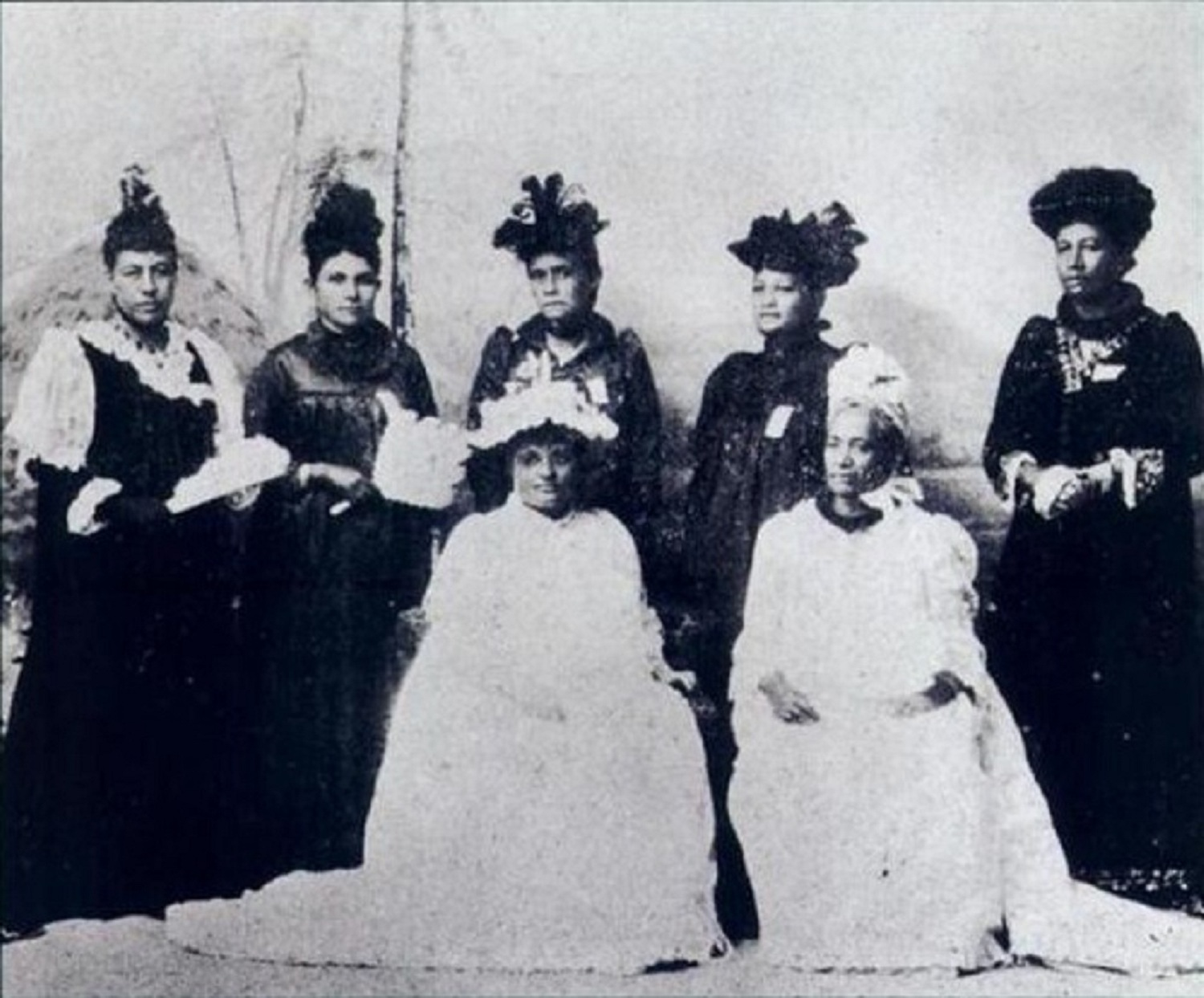
The Hui Aloha ʻĀina o Na Wahine leadership after Macfarlane's April 1893 resignation

In the wake of native opposition to the overthrow of the Hawaiian Kingdom on January 17, 1893, Macfarlane and other Hawaiian women with royalist sympathies formed Ka Hui Hawaiʻi Aloha ʻĀina o Na Wahine (the Hawaiian Women's Patriotic League, also known as Hui Aloha ʻĀina for Women). The group was founded on March 27, 1893, shortly after its male counterpart (Hui Aloha ʻĀina for Men) was formed to support deposed Queen Liliʻuokalani and oppose the overthrow and related plans to annex the islands to the United States.

Macfarlane was elected the first president of the organization; her sister, Martha Widemann Berger, and Abigail Kuaihelani Campbell were vice-presidents. When US President Grover Cleveland sent James H. Blount to investigate the overthrow, both Hui Aloha ʻĀina groups drafted resolutions to restore the monarchy. The drafting of the resolution for the Hui Aloha ʻĀina for Women was particularly contentious. The version drafted by Macfarlane and the group's leaders was rejected; Macfarlane resigned the presidency on April 17, 1893, and was replaced by Campbell. The sisters' great-granddaughter, Alice Flanders Guild, said that they remained lifelong friends despite the rift. According to contemporary newspaper reports, the rift in the group stemmed from suspicions by its older Hawaiian members that the younger, better-educated members wanted to replace Liliʻuokalani with Queen Kapiʻolani or Princess Kaʻiulani.

Below is the resolution by Macfarlane and the earlier leadership. The use of the word "Queen" and the absence of Liliʻuokalani's name were the reasons for suspicion by the older women:

Greeting: We, the members of the Hawaiian Women's Patriotic League, formed for the sole purpose of perpetrating the independence of Hawaii, a kingdom for whom our ancestors fought and bled in war, do hereby implore Your Excellency to recommend to your Government the restoration of our beloved Queen on the throne of Hawaii, and that the present stage should be brought to an end. The people of Hawaii have received you with a warm welcome, and it would be a deed of humanity on your part to grant the earnest and humble supplications of the patriotic women subjects of the sovereign of Hawaii nei.

=== Hawaiian Relief Society ===
On August 9, 1895, cholera arrived in Honolulu aboard the ship Belgic, carrying 500 Chinese immigrants from Yokohama to Hawaii. Three crew members had died en route and the first local cases were reported on August 20. Efforts were enacted by the Republic of Hawaii's Board of Health to quarantine the sick, restrict large gatherings to lower contact transmissions and enhance hygiene measures in the countryside. The Board also banned the consumption of fish from Nuʻuanu Stream and Honolulu Harbor and the production of poi, a staple food for Hawaiians, in certain areas of Honolulu. The disease disproportionately affected Native Hawaiians and a subsequent report written by the Board of Health on September 25 indicated that certain taro and rice fields were connected to contaminated water sources. The epidemic, contained to Honolulu, resulted in a total of 87 cases and 64 deaths and negatively impacted the Hawaiian economy. This was the first incident of cholera in the Hawaiian Islands.

In the wake of the epidemic, Macfarlane cofounded the Hawaiian Relief Society on September 6, 1895, with fellow Hawaiian civic leaders Bathsheba Robinson Allen, Emma Kaili Metcalf Beckley Nakuina, Elizabeth Kekaʻaniau and Abigail Kuaihelani Campbell to assist the victims of the cholera. She served as the organization's first treasurer. The organization raised funds for the care of patients and provided Hawaiians with food, firewood, clothing and other supplies including sanitized poi boiled in hot water. The organization also hosted luau and bazaars to raise funds after the end of the epidemic. The monarchy's former heir presumptive, Princess Kaʻiulani, was also an active member of the society.

=== Involvements after annexation ===
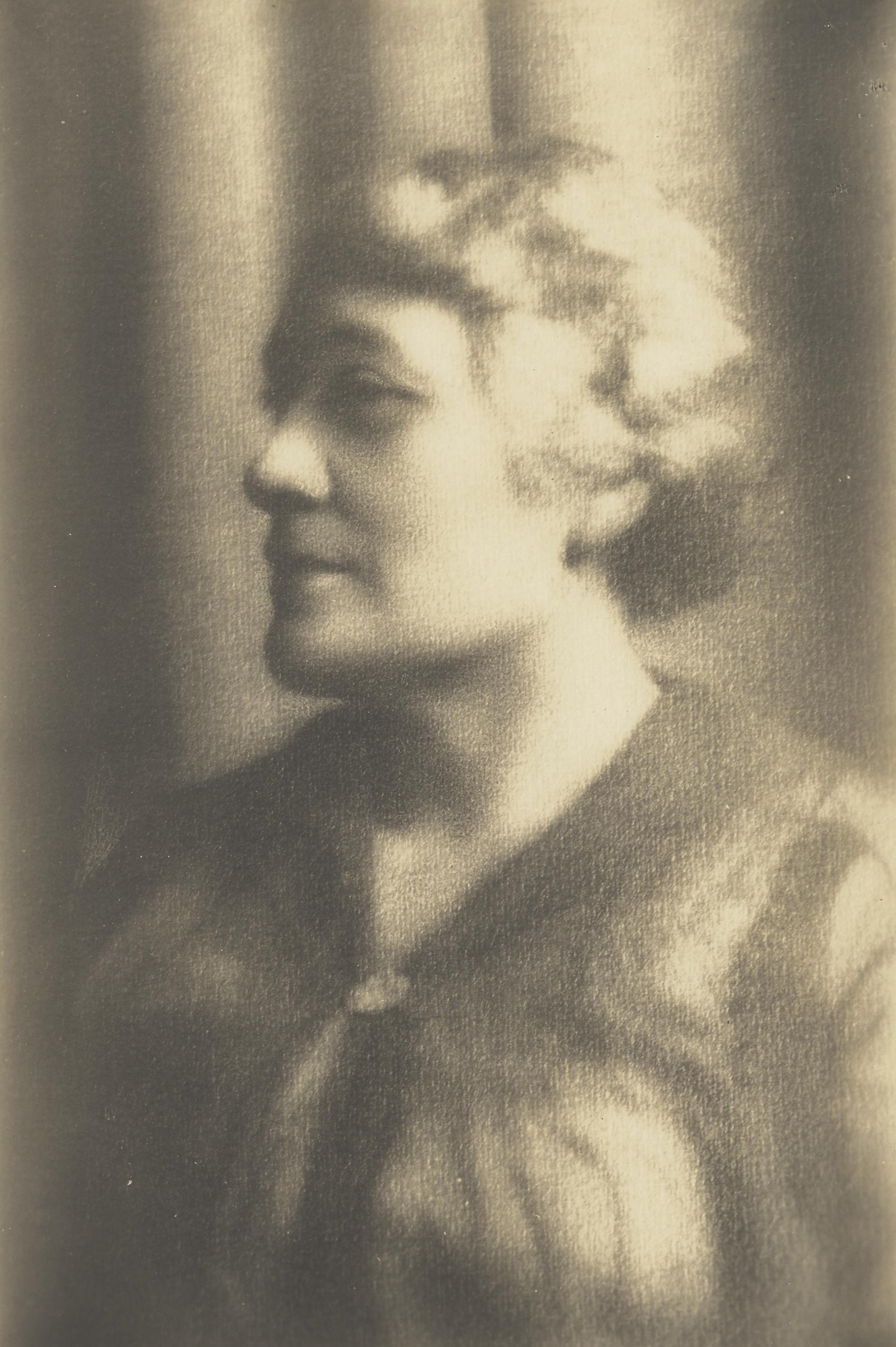
Emilie Widemann Macfarlane in 1917

Macfarlane became a supporter of the women's-suffrage movement with her sister, Wilhelmine, in 1912. Native Hawaiian women of high societal rank like Macfarlane were key early campaigners for this cause. Her sister became president of the National Women's Equal Suffrage Association of Hawaii, the islands' first women's suffrage club. The major obstacle to female enfranchisement was the Organic Act, which established the Territory of Hawaii. Unlike the United States constitution and most state constitutions, it specifically forbade the territorial legislature from granting suffrage. With the assistance of suffragist leaders on the mainland such as Almira Hollander Pitman and Carrie Chapman Catt, Hawaiian suffragists and their allies were able to push an act (ignored until then) through Congress granting Hawaii the power to decide the issue. In 1919, a local bill to enfranchise the women of Hawaii was proposed. Although the Macfarlane sisters were among the leading Hawaiian women to speak at mass meetings in favor of the legislation, the bill stalled. The Nineteenth Amendment to the United States Constitution was passed by the United States House of Representatives on May 21, 1919, however, and by the Senate on June 4. The amendment was ratified by 36 states (a two-thirds majority) on August 18, 1920, granting all female citizens of the United States and its territories the right to vote. On August 30, Macfarlane became one of the first twelve women to register to vote in Honolulu.

Macfarlane and her friend, Emma Ahuena Taylor, organized knitting units on behalf of Native Hawaiian soldiers who were fighting in World War I; her sister was president of the Hawaiian Knitting Unit, which was formed in March 1918. According to historian Rumi Yasutake, Native Hawaiians of German descent (such as Macfarlane and her sisters) felt political pressure from their paternal connections to the German Empire—the wartime enemy of the United States—and their past anti-annexation activities. Regardless, they channeled their wartime efforts into helping Native Hawaiian servicemen. During the war, Macfarlane was a member of the Women's Committee of the Territorial Food Commission and Federal Food Administration.

Macfarlane was also a member of the Daughters of Hawaii, which was founded in 1903 to preserve the islands' historic legacy. Macfarlane generated interest from 1913 to 1914 in the preservation of Hānaiakamalama, the former summer palace of Queen Emma now managed by the Daughters of Hawaii:

This building is the only thing which now stands as a landmark to old Hawaii. The palace has been turned into an executive building, the old associations there have been done away with. This old landmark we are now pleading for, this former home of a former queen, is the only place we can now show a tourist as representative of the days gone by.

Macfarlane was a founding member of the Kapiolani Maternity Home and Kaʻiulani Home for Girls, and was involved with the board of an industrial school which helped rehabilitate youths of the Territory of Hawaii. She and her husband were founding members of Saint Augustine by the Sea Catholic Church in Waikiki.

== Death ==
Macfarlane lived in ʻĀhuimanu, Koʻolaupoko, on the windward side of Oahu. She died on March 13, 1947, at the Queen's Hospital in Honolulu after a two-month illness. Obituaries in local newspapers, including The Honolulu Advertiser and the Honolulu Star-Bulletin, detailed her civic activities and family relationships. Macfarlane is buried at the Oahu Cemetery in Honolulu.

== Bibliography ==
- Bouslog, Charles; Greig, Thelma (1994). Mānoa: the Story of a Valley. Honolulu: Mutual Publishing. ISBN 978-1-56647-067-4. OCLC 32599587.
- Carter, George Robert; Hawaii. Sanitary Commission; Hawaii. Board of Health (1912). Report of the Sanitary commission (created under act of the Legislature of 1911) to His Excellency the Honorable W.F. Frear, governor of Hawaii. Honolulu: Press of the Hawaiian Gazette Company. OCLC 596970493.
- Damon, Ethel Moseley (1931). Koamalu: A Story of Pioneers on Kauai, and of what They Built in that Island Garden. Vol. 1. Honolulu: Honolulu Star-Bulletin Press. OCLC 653475.
- Forbes, David W., ed. (2003). Hawaiian National Bibliography, 1780–1900, Volume 4: 1881–1900. Vol. 4. Honolulu: University of Hawaii Press. ISBN 978-0-8248-2636-9. OCLC 123279964.
- Harper, Ida Husted, ed. (1922). History of Woman Suffrage: 1900–1920. Vol. VI. New York: National American Woman Suffrage Association. OCLC 10703030.
- Hoffman, Frederick Ludwig (1916). The Sanitary Progress and Vital Statistics of Hawaii. Newark, NJ: Prudential Press. OCLC 14803532.
- Judd, Henry P.; Hilleary, Perry Edward (1954). Men and women of Hawaii, 1954; a biographical encyclopedia of persons of notable achievement, an historical account of the peoples who have distinguished themselves through personal success and through public service. Honolulu, HI: Honolulu Business Consultants – via HathiTrust.
- McKinzie, Edith Kawelohea (1986). Stagner, Ishmael W. (ed.). Hawaiian Genealogies: Extracted from Hawaiian Language Newspapers. Vol. 2. Honolulu: University of Hawaii Press. ISBN 978-0-939154-37-1. OCLC 12555087.
- Nellist, George F. M. (1925). The Story of Hawaii and Its Builders: With which is Incorporated Volume III Men of Hawaii; an Historical Outline of Hawaii with Biographical Sketches of Its Men of Note and Substantial Achievement, Past and Present, who Have Contributed to the Progress of the Territory. Honolulu: Honolulu Star-Bulletin. hdl:10524/56596. OCLC 153923202.
- Peterson, Barbara Bennett (1984). Notable Women of Hawaii. Honolulu: University of Hawaii Press. ISBN 978-0-8248-0820-4. OCLC 11030010.
- Silva, Noenoe K. (1998). "The 1897 Petitions Protesting Annexation". The Annexation Of Hawaii: A Collection Of Document. University of Hawaii at Manoa. Archived from the original on December 30, 2016.
- Silva, Noenoe K. (2004). Aloha Betrayed: Native Hawaiian Resistance to American Colonialism. Durham: Duke University Press. ISBN 0-8223-8622-4. OCLC 191222123.
- Webb, Nancy; Webb, Jean Francis (1998) [1962]. Kaiulani: Crown Princess of Hawaii. Honolulu: Mutual Publishing. ISBN 978-1-56647-206-7. OCLC 265217757.
- Whitehead, John S. (1993). "Anti-Statehood Movement and the Legacy of Alice Kamokila Campbell". The Hawaiian Journal of History. 27. Honolulu: Hawaiian Historical Society: 43–63. hdl:10524/218. OCLC 60626541.
- Wood, C. B.; Crawley, J. T; Dillingham, B. F. (1896). Special Report of the Board of Health upon the Cholera Epidemic in Honolulu, Hawaiian Islands, in August and September. 1895. Honolulu: Hawaiian Gazette Company's Print. OCLC 9116440.
- Yasutake, Rumi (2015). "Hawaiian Nationalism, American Patriotism, and Re-franchising Women in Post-Annexation Hawaiʻi, 1912–1920". The Journal of Konan University. Faculty of Letters. Vol. 165. Konan University. pp. 119–126. doi:10.14990/00001568. OCLC 5824364875.
- Yasutake, Rumi (2017). "Re-Franchising Women of Hawaiʻi, 1912–1920: Politics of Gender, Sovereignty, Race, and Rank at the Crossroads of the Pacific". In Choy, Catherine Ceniza; Wu, Judy Tzu-Chun (eds.). Gendering the Trans-Pacific World. Leiden: Brill. ISBN 978-90-04-33610-0. OCLC 976394366.
- Yasutake, Rumi (February 29, 2020). "Women in Hawai'i and the Nineteenth Amendment". Journal of Women's History. 32 (1): 32–40. doi:10.1353/jowh.2020.0004. ISSN 1527-2036. JSTOR 750633.
