= Emma Kaili Metcalf Beckley Nakuina =

Hawaiian judge, curatrix, and writer (1847–1929)

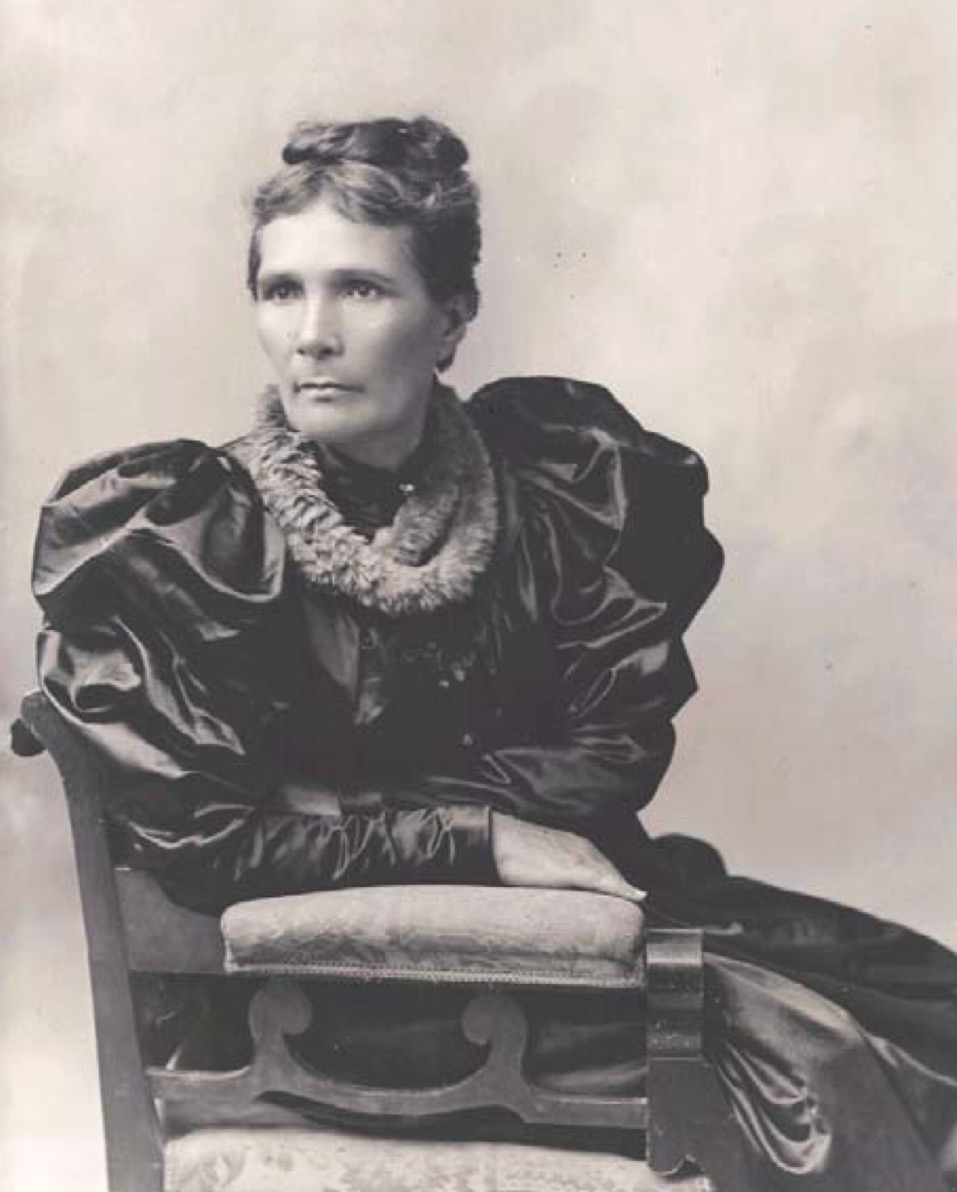
- Emma Kaili Metcalf Beckley Nakuina, c. 1904
- Born: March 5, 1847; Kauaʻala, Manoa Valley, Oahu, Kingdom of Hawaii
- Died: April 27, 1929 (aged 82)
- Resting place: Oahu Cemetery
- Education: Punahou School; Sacred Hearts Academy
- Known for: being the first female judge of Hawaii
- Spouse: Frederick William Beckley Sr. (m. 1867; died 1881) Moses Kuaea Nakuina (m. 1887; died 1911)
- Children: Frederick William Beckley Jr. and others

Emma Kailikapuolono Metcalf Beckley Nakuina (March 5, 1847 – April 27, 1929) was an early Hawaiian female judge, curator and cultural writer. Descended from an American sugar planter and a Hawaiian high chiefess, she was educated in Hawaii and California. She served as curator of the Hawaiian National Museum from 1882 to 1887 and as Commissioner of Private Ways and Water Rights from 1892 to 1907. In her role as a government commissioner, she is often regarded as Hawaii's first female judge. During the early 1900s, she became a supporter of the women's suffrage movement in the Territory of Hawaii. Nakuina was also a prolific writer on the topic of Hawaiian culture and folklore and her many literary works include Hawaii, Its People, Their Legends (1904).

== Early life and family ==
Nakuina was born March 5, 1847, at her family's homestead in Kauaʻala in the Manoa Valley, at what is now the campus of the University of Hawaii at Manoa. Her father Theophilus Metcalf, originally from Ontario County, New York, arrived in Hawaii on May 19, 1842, and was naturalized as a citizen on March 9, 1846. He worked as a sugar planter and government land surveyor during the Great Mahele. Her mother, Kailikapuolono, was a descendant of the aliʻi lineages of Oahu, which was traditionally associated with the Kūkaniloko Birthstones, where the highest-ranking chiefs of the islands were once born. Her maternal great-grandfather was Nahili, a chief from the island of Hawaii and one of the generals of King Kamehameha I during his conquest of the Hawaiian Islands. Her maternal family was considered to be of the Hawaiian kaukau aliʻi class, or lower ranking chiefs in service to the royal family.

Nakuina was educated at Sacred Hearts Academy and Punahou School in Honolulu. She was also privately tutored in many languages by her father including Greek, Latin, Hebrew, French, German, English, and Hawaiian. In 1866, she was preparing to attend the Young Ladies Seminary (modern day Mills College) in Benicia, California. No records exist of her attendance in the Mills College archives. Her father died on August 6, 1866, while visiting Oakland, possibly in order to settle her into her new school, and she decided to stay in Hawaii instead. At a young age, King Kamehameha IV ordered her to be trained in traditional water rights and customs.

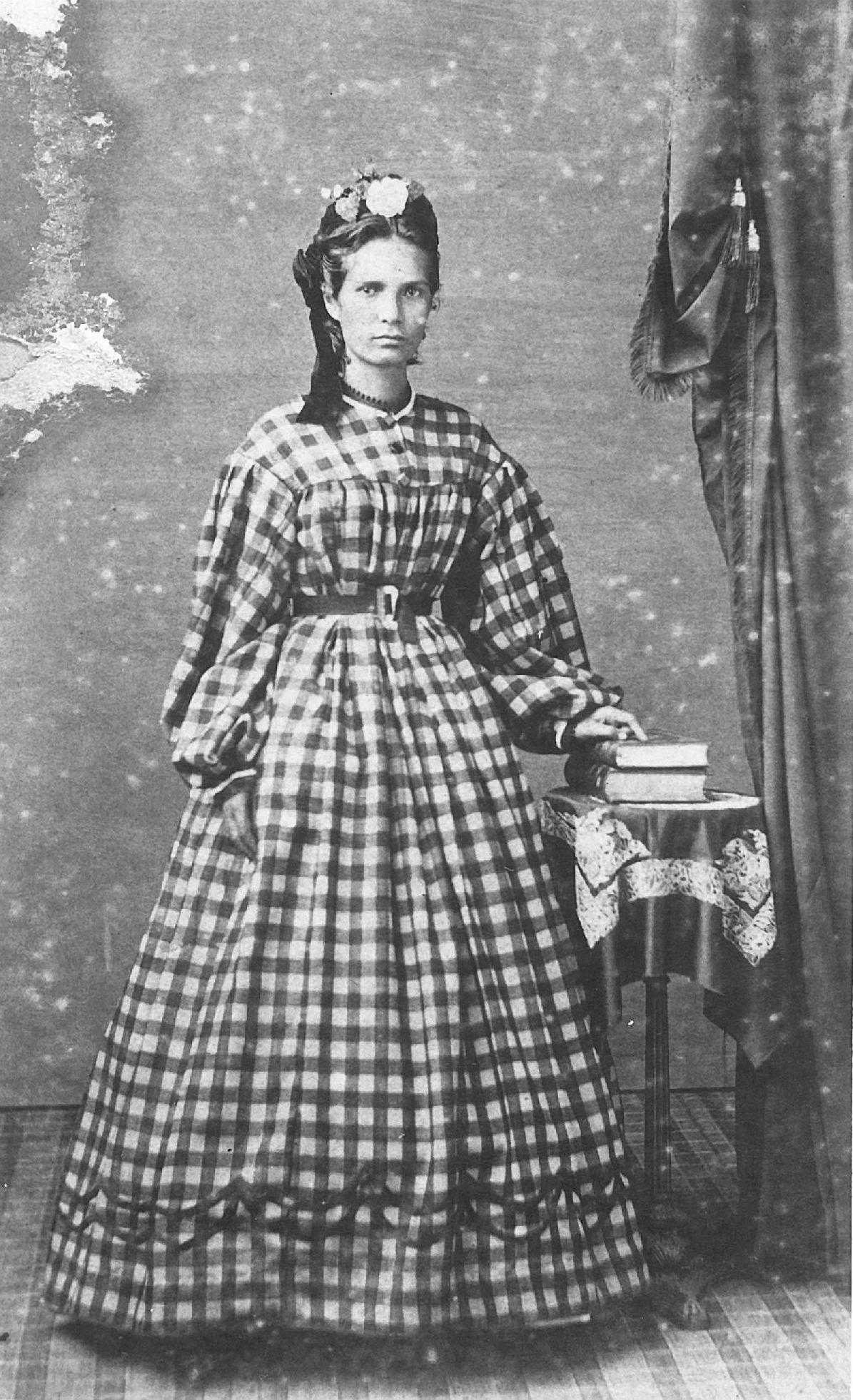
Emma Metcalf, photograph by Charles Leander Weed, c. 1865

On December 3, 1867, she married Frederick William Beckley Sr. (1845–1881), a part-Hawaiian noble like herself. She served as the lady-in-waiting of Queen Kapiʻolani, the wife of King Kalākaua, while her husband served as the Chamberlain of the Royal Household and in the Hawaiian government as a member of the House of Representatives and as the Royal Governor of Kauai. They had seven children, including son Frederick William Beckley Jr. (1874–1943) and daughter Sabina Beckley Hutchinson (1868–1935). Beckley Sr. died in 1881, leaving Nakuina a widow. In 1887, she remarried to the Reverend Moses Kuaea Nakuina (1867–1911). A nephew of Minister of Finance Moses Kuaea, he was twenty years her junior and also a descendant of Hawaiian nobility. They had two children: a short-lived son named Irving Metcalf Nakuina, who was born and died in 1888, and a daughter who contracted leprosy and was sent to the Kalaupapa Leprosy Settlement.

A newspaper article in the October 16, 1916, issue of the Honolulu Star-Bulletin stated Emma was godmother to Princess Kaʻiulani, the niece of Kalākaua and last heir to the Hawaiian throne.

== Career ==
At the age of 27, Walter Murray Gibson appointed Nakuina as the curator of the Hawaiian National Museum and Government Library; Gibson may have done so at the suggestion of King Kalākaua. She used the title curatrix in official documents, which she changed from curator. The salary from this governmental post helped her support her children. During her tenure as the governmental curatrix, Nakuina expanded the collection of the museum, which was located on the upper floor of Aliiolani Hale, the governmental building, and also established herself as an authority on traditional Hawaiian legends and history with a number of publications. She assisted the writers Thomas G. Thrum and William DeWitt Alexander in many of their works as a cultural advisor and translator. After the downfall of the Gibson administration in 1887, funding to the museum was cut and the collections were later incorporated into the Bishop Museum.

In 1892, she was appointed Commissioner of Private Ways and Water Rights for the district of Kona, on the island of Oahu, corresponding to the capital city of Honolulu and its surrounding areas. Nakuina was chosen for this post specifically because of her knowledge of traditional water rights, and she was tasked with the duties of resolving water usage and rights issues. She held this position from 1892 to 1907, at which point the powers were reassigned to the circuit courts. During her tenure, she worked under the monarchy until the 1893 overthrow of the Kingdom of Hawaii. In order to remain in her governmental post, she took the oath of allegiance to the subsequent regimes of the Provisional Government, the Republic and the Territory of Hawaii. Although she never held the formal title, she is often regarded as Hawaii's first female judge.

In March 1893, she became a member of Hui Aloha ʻĀina o Na Wahine (Hawaiian Women's Patriotic League) or Hui Aloha ʻĀina for Women. This patriotic group was founded shortly after its male counterpart the Hui Aloha ʻĀina for Men to oppose the overthrow and plans to annex the islands to the United States and to support the deposed queen. Nakuina served as interpreter of the organization for a month until a dispute arose between two factions of the group. The rift centered on the wordings to a memorial seeking the restoration of the monarchy to be presented to the United States Commissioner James Henderson Blount who was sent by President Grover Cleveland to investigate the overthrow. The original memorial used the word "Queen" leaving out Liliʻuokalani's name and was opposed by the small faction consisting of elderly, full-blood Hawaiian women who suspected that it was a ploy by the younger, educated part-Hawaiians to put either Kapiʻolani or Kaʻiulani on the throne instead. A second memorial was drafted including Liliʻuokalani's name and the original architects of the first memorial including Nakuina either resigned or were replaced. Nakuina was replaced by Mary Ann Kaulalani Parker Stillman.

In 1895, Nakuina helped founded the Hawaiian Relief Society in her office to assist the victims of a cholera epidemic in the islands. She co-founded the organization with other leading Hawaiian women including Elizabeth Kekaʻaniau, Abigail Kuaihelani Campbell and Emilie Widemann Macfarlane, who had all been members of Hui Aloha ʻĀina for Women.

In 1897, Nakuina was mentioned in an article by Janet Jennings, of the Chicago Times-Herald, about the important role and status of part-Hawaiian women in the Hawaiian nation, which described her as "a clever and accomplished woman, whose scholarly attainments make her a unique figure in political and social circles of Honolulu."

== Later life ==
In later life, Nakuina returned to writing. She became one of the first female members of the Hawaiian Historical Society and joined the civic organization Daughters of Hawaii. In 1904, she wrote her only book, Hawaii, Its People, Their Legends, published by the Hawaiian Promotion Committee. It was meant to introduce tourists to the culture of Hawaii, but was also imbued with her own sense of pride for her Hawaiian heritage and bitterness at the negative effects of foreign influence in the islands. According to Cristina Bacchilega, this publication was a covert example of feminine defiance against the Western world.

In 1917, Nakuina hosted a party for Almira Hollander Pitman, a leading suffragist from the mainland United States, and her husband Banjamin Franklin Pitman. The gathering attracted many upper-class Honolulu suffragists including Wilhelmine Widemann Dowsett, president of the National Women's Equal Suffrage Association of Hawaii, and Emma Ahuena Taylor, who asked Almira Pitman to espouse the cause of the women of the Territory of Hawaii. This meeting and subsequent meetings with the Honolulu Women's Club prompted Almira Pitman to write to her connections back home, which helped push a bill through Congress authorizing the Hawaii Territorial Legislature with the power to legislate on the issue of women's suffrage. A local bill was planned in 1919 to enfranchise the women of Hawaii. It was superseded before it could be adopted when, in the following year, Congress passed the Nineteenth Amendment, granting all women in the United States the right to vote.

Nakuina died on April 27, 1929, in her son's house, at the age of eighty-two. She was buried at the Oahu Cemetery with her second husband, Moses Nakuina. In 2017, Hawaiʻi Magazine listed Nakuina among the most influential women in Hawaiian history.

== Publications and works ==
List below are the known works of Emma Kaili Metcalf Beckley Nakuina in chronological order:

- Beckley, Mrs. Emma Metcalf (1883). Hawaiian Fisheries and Methods of Fishing, With An Account Of The Fishing Implements Used By The Natives Of The Hawaiian Islands. Honolulu: Minister of Foreign Affairs.
- Kaili. "Hiiaka. A Hawaiian Legend by a Hawaiian Native. A Legend of the Goddess Pele, Her Lover Lohiau and her Sister Hiiakaikapoliopele." Daily Pacific Commercial Advertiser, August 25 – October 13, 1883. (Reprinted in Nimmo, H. Arlo. Pele, Volcano Goddess of Hawaiʻi: A History, 2011: 50–75.)
- E. M. B. (Beckley, Emma M.). "Kahalaopuna: A Legend of Manoa Valley." Saturday Press, December 8, 1883: 2, c. 1–4. (Reprinted as "Kahalaopuna, Princess of Manoa" in Thrum's Hawaiian Folk Tales, 1907.)
- Beckley, Mrs. Emma Metcalf. "The Legend of the Fishhook, called Na-iwi-o-Pae, now in the Government Museum." Honolulu Almanac and Directory, 1884: 39–40.
- Beckley, Emma Metcalf. "Mrs. Beckley's Report on the Library," and "Mrs. Beckley's Report on the Museum." Report of the Minister of Foreign Affairs [to the Legislature], 1884.
- Beckley, Emma Metcalf. "Mrs. Beckley's Report on the Library and Museum," and "Mrs. Beckley's Report on Her Visit to Molokai." Report of the Minister of Foreign Affairs [to the Legislature], 1886.
- Alexander, W. D. (Beckley, Emma Metcalf and Harriet Green, translators). He Buke No Ke Ola Kono No Kamalii, 1887.
- Nakuina, Emma. "Historical Catalogue of the Museum." Compiled between 1882–1887. This document is handwritten, and housed in the Bishop Museum archives.
- His Hawaiian Majesty Kalakaua (Beckley, Mrs. E., contributor). The Legends and Myths of Hawaii, 1888.
- Nakuina, E. M. B. "The Punahou Spring: A Legend." Hawaiian Annual and Almanac, 1893. (Reprinted in Hawaii's Young People, Sept. 1901; Thrum's Hawaiian Folk Tales, 1907; and Paradise of the Pacific, March 1917.)
- Nakuina, Mrs. Emma M. "Hawaiian Sharks." Paradise of the Pacific, June 1893: 82.
- Nakuina, Mrs. Emma Metcalf. "Ancient Hawaiian Water Rights and Some Customs Pertaining to Them." Hawaiian Almanac and Annual, 1894: 79–84.
- Nakuina, Emma M. "Caused by Poisoned Crabs, The Theory Advanced by a Well-known Hawaiian Woman." The Hawaiian Gazette, September 6, 1895: 7, c. 1–2.
- Nakuina, Emma M. "The Woman's Relief Society, Officers Elected and Plans Made to Assist Hawaiians." The Hawaiian Gazette, September 10, 1895: 5, c. 6.
- Nakuina, E. M. B. "The Legend of the Shark-Man, Nanaue." Hawaiian Historical Society Annual Report, 1896: 10–19. (Reprinted in Thrum's Hawaiian Folk Tales, 1907; Hawaii's Young People, October 1902; Hawaii's Young People, April 1915.)
- Atkinson, A. T. and Emma M. Nakuina (contributor). "The Oldest Inhabitant," Department of Public Instruction, Report of the General Superintendent of the Census, 1896: 123–124.
- Nakuina, E. M. B. "The Legend of Oahunui." Hawaiian Annual and Almanac, 1897: 90–95. (Reprinted in Thrum's Hawaiian Folk Tales, 1907.)
- Nakuina, Emma Metcalf (1904). Hawaii, Its People, Their Legends. Honolulu: T. H.
- Nakuina, Mrs. Emma. The Moʻo of Konahuanui. Paper read at the Daughters of Hawaii meeting, 1906.
- Nakuina, Mrs. E. M. Contributions to Hawaiian Folk Tales by Thomas G. Thrum, 1907.
- Nakuina, Mrs. Emma. Battle of Nuʻuanu. Draft prepared for the Daughters of Hawaii, to be read at the unveiling of a plaque placed at the Pali Lookout, commemorating the battle, 1907.
- Nakuina, Mrs. Emma. The Hawaiian Coat of Arms. Paper read at the Daughters of Hawaii meeting, 1911.
- Nakuina, Mrs. Emma. A Tradition of Kaimuki. Paper read at the Daughters of Hawaii meeting, 1912.
- Nakuina, Mrs. Emma. "The Royal Arms of Hawaii, to be Presented in Features of Program for Kauikeaouli Centenary." Pacific Commercial Advertiser, March 15, 1914: 1.
- Nakuina, Emma K. "The Legend of the Kawaiahao Stone." The Friend, August 1919: 181–182.
- Nakuina, Emma M. "The Legend of Kalaipahoa, The Famous Poison God of Molokai." Paradise of the Pacific, May 1920: 31.
- Nakuina, Mrs. Emma. "The Springs of Wailele." The Friend, April 1923: 81–82.

== See also ==
- List of first women lawyers and judges in Hawaii

== Bibliography ==
- Bacchilega, Cristina (2007). "Emma Nakuina's Hawaii: Its People, Their Legends: Out of Place Stories II". Legendary Hawaiʻi and the Politics of Place: Tradition, Translation, and Tourism. Philadelphia: University of Pennsylvania Press. pp. 102–136. ISBN 978-0-8122-0117-8. OCLC 759158207.
- Charlot, Jean (2005). Moses Kuaea Nakuina: Hawaiian Novelist (PDF). Laie, HI: Pacific Institute, Brigham Young Brigham Young University–Hawaii. ISBN 978-0-939154-71-5. OCLC 64686034.
- Day, Arthur Grove (1984). History Makers of Hawaii: a Biographical Dictionary. Honolulu: Mutual Publishing of Honolulu. ISBN 978-0-935180-09-1. OCLC 11087565.
- Harper, Ida Husted, ed. (1922). History of Woman Suffrage: 1900–1920. Vol. VI. New York: National American Woman Suffrage Association. OCLC 10703030.
- Hopkins, Jaime Uluwehi (August 2012). Hānau ma ka lolo, for the benefit of her race : a portrait of Emma Kaʻilikapuolono Metcalf Beckley Nakuina (M. A. thesis). University of Hawaii at Manoa. hdl:10125/100964.
- Peterson, Barbara Bennett (1984). Notable Women of Hawaii. Honolulu: University of Hawaii Press. ISBN 978-0-8248-0820-4. OCLC 11030010.
- Scanlon, Jennifer; Cosner, Shaaron (1996). American Women Historians, 1700s–1990s: A Biographical Dictionary. Westport, CT: Greenwood Publishing Group. ISBN 978-0-313-29664-2. OCLC 154243868.
- Silva, Noenoe K. (2004). Aloha Betrayed: Native Hawaiian Resistance to American Colonialism. Durham: Duke University Press. ISBN 978-0-8223-8622-3. OCLC 191222123.
- Taylor, Albert Pierce (1922). Under Hawaiian Skies: A Narrative of the Romance, Adventure and History of the Hawaiian Islands. Honolulu: Advertiser Publishing Company, Ltd. OCLC 479709.
- Taylor, Albert Pierce (1926). Under Hawaiian Skies: A Narrative of the Romance, Adventure and History of the Hawaiian Islands, a Complete Historical Account. Honolulu: Advertiser Publishing Company, Ltd. OCLC 1547523.
- Yasutake, Rumi (2017). "Re-Franchising Women of Hawaiʻi, 1912–1920: Politics of Gender, Sovereignty, Race, and Rank at the Crossroads of the Pacific". In Choy, Catherine Ceniza; Wu, Judy Tzu-Chun (eds.). Gendering the Trans-Pacific World. Leiden: Brill. ISBN 978-90-04-33610-0. OCLC 976394366.

Government offices
| Preceded by Pierre Jones | Commissioner of Private Ways and Water Rights; 1892–1907 | Position abolished |
| Preceded by David Dwight Baldwin | Curator of the Hawaiian National Museum; 1882–1887 | Position abolished |
