= Wilhelmine Kekelaokalaninui Widemann Dowsett =

Native Hawaiian suffragist

Wilhelmine Widemann Dowsett
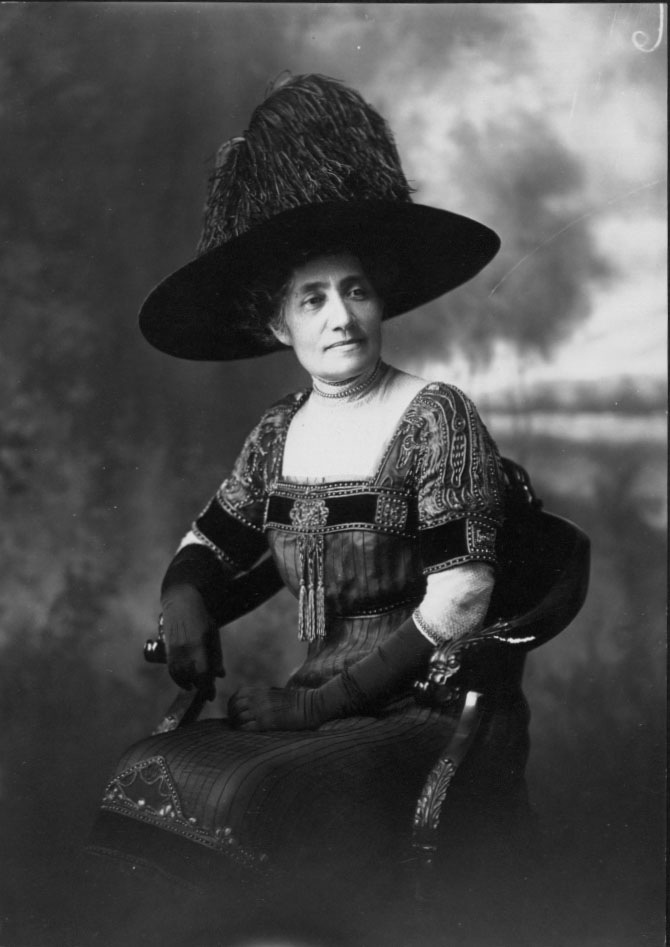
- Wilhelmine Dowsett, 1918
- Born: Wilhelmine Kekelaokalaninui Widemann; March 28, 1861; Lihue, Kingdom of Hawaii
- Died: December 10, 1929 (aged 68); Honolulu, Territory of Hawaii
- Resting place: Oahu Cemetery
- Political party: Republican
- Spouse: John McKibbin Dowsett
- Children: 3
- Parent(s): Hermann A. Widemann; Mary Kaumana Pilahiuilani

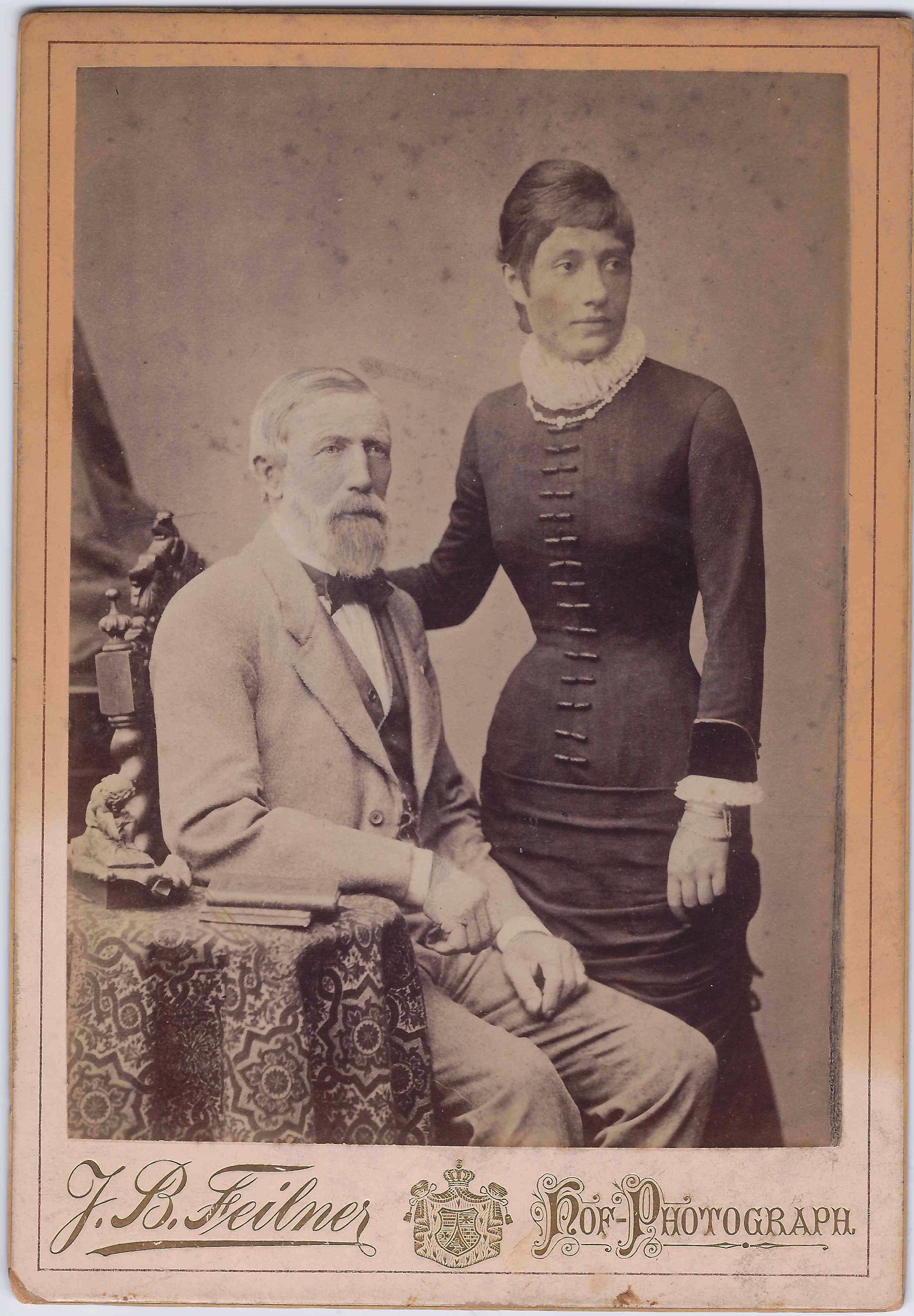
Wilhelmine with her father Hermann A. Widemann, c. 1881

Wilhelmine Kekelaokalaninui Widemann Dowsett (March 28, 1861 – December 10, 1929) was a Native Hawaiian suffragist who helped organize the National Women's Equal Suffrage Association of Hawaii, the first women's suffrage club in the Territory of Hawaii in 1912. She actively campaigned for the rights of the women of Hawaii to vote prior to the passage of the Nineteenth Amendment to the United States Constitution in 1920.

== Early life and family ==
Wilhelmine (nicknamed "Minnie"), whose name was sometimes spelled as "Wilhelmina", was born on March 28, 1861, at Lihue, Kauai, the daughter of German immigrant and businessman Hermann A. Widemann and his Hawaiian wife, Mary Kaumana Pilahiuilani. There was some disagreement about the exact royal descent of her mother after her death, although her mother's grandfather Kalawa was a retainer of the aliʻi of Kauai. Her father was a prominent politician of the Kingdom of Hawaii and a cabinet minister of the last queen Liliʻuokalani.

On April 30, 1888, she married John "Jack" McKibbin Dowsett (1862–1929), a grandson of the British Captain Samuel James Dowsett who settled in Hawaii in 1828. Their wedding at the St. Andrew's Cathedral in Honolulu was attended by members of the Hawaiian Royal Family including King Kalākaua, Queen Kapiʻolani, Princesses Liliʻuokalani and Kaʻiulani. Her husband became a successful businessman with interests in banking, fire insurance, the sugar industry and interisland steamers and became the largest shareholder of Waianae Sugar Company. He served as a Republican Senator in the Hawaii Territorial Legislature from 1905 to 1907 and served as an official on the Board of Agriculture and Forestry and the Board of Prison Inspectors. They had three children: Herbert Melville Kualii (1890–1969), Frank Llewellyn Lunalilo (1891–1962), and Alice Aileen Kekuiapoiwa Liliha (1898–1983).

== Women's suffrage in Hawaii ==
After the annexation of Hawaii to the United States, she became a prominent leader of the women's suffrage. The enfranchisement of the women of California, Oregon and Washington in the 1910s contributed to an increased interest in the movement in Hawaii. In 1912, at the request of the women of Honolulu, Dowsett organized the National Women's Equal Suffrage Association of Hawaii (WESAH), the first local women's suffrage club. The group insisted on being referred to as suffragists rather than suffragettes, which carried with it the negative association with the militant British movement. Its constitution was modeled after the National Woman Suffrage Association with Dowsett as the president. Carrie Chapman Catt, visiting from the mainland, was invited to speak with the group on October 28, 1918, and contributed to the growing interest. The Honolulu Star-Bulletin noted:

The Hawaiian women are anxious to vote and they are ready to do all they can to gain equal suffrage. One of the members said yesterday that up to the present time the native women have not known just what steps to take and therefore have made no progress but she said that with Mrs. Dowsett as the president they feel that the cause will surely advance. All of the members are anxious to be active and want to arouse Interest among all of the women in the city irrespective of nationality.

Wealthy women of Native Hawaiian and biracial descents like Dowsett, Emma Ahuena Davison Taylor and Emma Nāwahī were the initial leaders of this movement while women of Euro-American descent (i.e. the "missionary set") were less inclined to support the cause due to concern about the increased enfranchisement of non-white female voters. During a meeting of the organization with local politicians in 1913, Dowsett argued that women were superior to men, stating:

I can speak for my Hawaiian sisters, and I can say that in every way the woman is man's superior. She will not only cast her vote fully as intelligently—she will vote, honestly. There isn't enough money in the world to buy her vote. And on the jury she will decide as intelligently, while there will be no question as to her verdict."

The major obstacle to female enfranchisement was the Organic Act which established the Territory of Hawaii and specifically forbid the territorial legislature from granting suffrage contrary to the federal constitution unlike most other state constitutions. With the assistance of suffragist leaders on the mainland such as Almira Hollander Pitman and Catt, Hawaiian suffragist leaders and their allies were able to push an act, ignored up to that point, through Congress granting Hawaii the power to decide on the issue.

In 1919, a bill granting the vote to women in the Territory was being discussed in the legislature. The Senate passed the bill but it found opposition in the House. It became deadlocked due to disagreement within the two bodies about whether the bill would take into effect in the primary election of 1919 or 1920. On March 6, 1919, Dowsett called a mass meeting the women of WESAH which adopted a resolution demanding the right to vote for women in the upcoming primary and regular election. The House instead introduced another bill which would further delay the issue of the vote and relegate the matter to a referendum on the issue. On March 23, Dowsett and Louise MacMillan, a WESAH officer representing Hawaii Island, rallied nearly 500 women of "various nationalities, of all ages". This group stormed the floor of the House, carrying a huge banner with the message "Votes for Women". The following day, the House held a two-hour hearing on the issue of women suffrage and invited both supporters and opponents to speak. Dowsett and MacMillan held a large gathering at ʻAʻala Park to press their cause to the people. Speakers and participants included Princess Elizabeth Kahanu Kalanianaʻole, Lahilahi Webb, former First Lady Mary Dillingham Frear, and Mary Haʻaheo Atcherley.

Dowsett made a tour of the other Hawaiian Islands in an attempt to get more popular support for the bill's passing. The bill never passed because the following year Congress passed the Nineteenth Amendment, granting all women in the United States the right to vote.

== Wartime knitting units ==
During World War I, Dowsett served as president of the Hawaiian Knitting Unit formed in March 1918 while her sister Emilie Widemann Macfarlane and her friend Emma Ahuena Taylor were to the first to organize knitting units on behalf of Native Hawaiian soldiers and servicemen abroad. Historian Rumi Yasutake argued that Native Hawaiians of German descents such as Dowsett and her sisters felt political pressure from both their paternal connections to the German Empire, the wartime enemy of the United States, and the anti-annexation activities they participated in the past. Thus they channeled their wartime efforts into helping Native Hawaiian servicemen.

== Death and legacy ==
Dowsett died in Honolulu on December 10, 1929, shortly after her husband's death on September 1 of the same year. She was described as an "invalid" for the last year of her life. Following a private funeral, her cremated remains were buried next to her husband at the Oahu Cemetery. Her grave marker records her name as "Wilhelmine Widemann Dowsett."

In 2020, Dowsett was named an honoree of the National Women's History Alliance.

== Bibliography ==
- Harper, Ida Husted, ed. (1922). History of Woman Suffrage: 1900–1920. Vol. VI. New York: National American Woman Suffrage Association. OCLC 10703030.
- Hawaii (1918). Lydecker, Robert Colfax (ed.). Roster Legislatures of Hawaii, 1841–1918. Honolulu: Hawaiian Gazette Company. OCLC 60737418.
- McKinzie, Edith Kawelohea (1986). Stagner, Ishmael W. (ed.). Hawaiian Genealogies: Extracted from Hawaiian Language Newspapers. Vol. 2. Honolulu: University of Hawaii Press. ISBN 978-0-939154-37-1. OCLC 12555087.
- Peterson, Barbara Bennett (1984). Notable Women of Hawaii. Honolulu: University of Hawaii Press. ISBN 978-0-8248-0820-4. OCLC 11030010.
- Yasutake, Rumi (2017). "Re-Franchising Women of Hawaiʻi, 1912–1920: Politics of Gender, Sovereignty, Race, and Rank at the Crossroads of the Pacific". In Choy, Catherine Ceniza; Wu, Judy Tzu-Chun (eds.). Gendering the Trans-Pacific World. Leiden: Brill. ISBN 978-90-04-33610-0. OCLC 976394366.
