= Massachusetts Association Opposed to the Further Extension of Suffrage to Women =

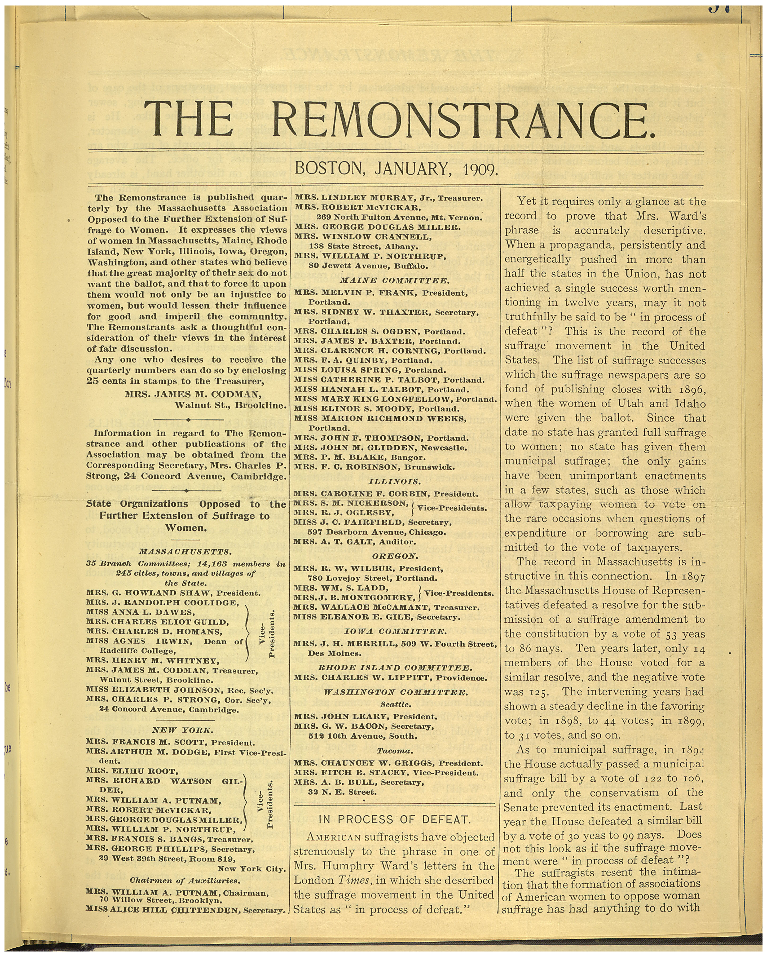
The Remonstrance (January 1909) published by the Massachusetts Association Opposed to the Further Extension of Suffrage to Women.

The Massachusetts Association Opposed to the Further Extension of Suffrage to Women (MAOFESW) was one of the earliest organizations formed to oppose women's suffrage in the United States. The organization was founded in May of 1895. However, MAOFESW had its roots in earlier Massachusetts anti-suffrage groups and had a publication called The Remonstrance, started in 1890.

== History ==
In the state of Massachusetts, women's suffrage referendums took place as early as 1868 and 1869. Around two hundred women were against granting to vote to women. An active anti-suffrage committee started operating since 1882 in Massachusetts. The committee started publishing a journal, The Remonstrance, in 1890. The journal's articles by women were published anonymously while a male editor was used in the first few years. The first committee spent most of its time collecting signatures for anti-suffrage petitions called "remonstrances."

In 1895, a bill, called the Wellman bill, to give women municipal suffrage in Boston was put to a popular vote and women who were involved in the anti-suffrage movement in Massachusetts felt they had to create a formal organization. The Massachusetts Association Opposed to the Further Extension of Suffrage to Women (MAOFESW) was founded in May of 1895. Women in the group started a boycott, while men publicly campaigned against the Wellman bill. By 1896, The Remonstrance was changed to show that MAOFESW was now responsible for its publication.

The first officers for MAOFESW were elected in 1897 with Mrs. J. Eliot Cabot as the president. The organization started to campaign throughout Massachusetts and grow into new branches in different cities. In 1898, The Remonstrance started describing the organization and the number of branches and communities represented. The Remonstrance also claimed to represent more of the general population than it actually did, attempting to "deflect suffrage criticism that antisuffragists came from the privileged elite." MAOFESW would send women to testify in front of government bodies and other organizations in the US about anti-suffrage ideas. They would also send issues of The Remonstrance to lawmakers. The paper was circulated outside of Massachusetts and antisuffragists used the arguments contained in the paper in their own campaigns.

Mrs. G. Howland Shaw was elected president of the organization in 1909 and 1910. MAOFESW had 11,000 women involved in the group by 1905 and 37,000 by 1915. By 1905, there were 34 branches across the state, representing 243 communities.

After the 19th amendment was passed in 1920, the MAOFESW disbanded.

== Politics ==
The MAOFESW believed that women were best suited to working in the domestic sphere and that their work in promoting public programs should remain non-partisan. Because the women found influence through the women's club movement and other women's organizations, they were worried that getting involved in politics would shift power balances unfavorably. In addition, since women had made many reforms without using the vote, they felt that voting was unnecessary. They also advocated for conservative positions, such as keeping old laws that made the husband the legal guardian of a couples' children, not both parents.
