= Mary Haʻaheo Atcherley =

Hawaiian activist

Mary Ha'aheo Atcherley
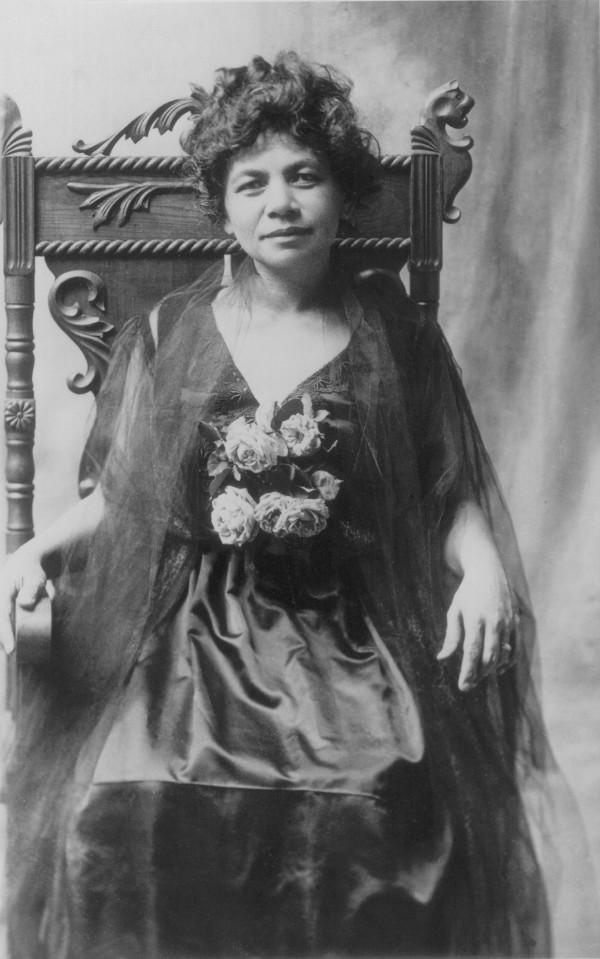
- Born: Mary Ha'aheo Kinimaka; April 24, 1874; Honolulu, Oahu
- Died: March 8, 1933 (aged 58)
- Other names: Mary Ha'aheo Kinimaka-Atcherley, Mary Ha'aheo Leleo Kinimaka
- Spouse: John Atcherley (m. 1894)
- Parents: David Leleo Kinimaka (father); Hannah Keolaokalaau Kinimaka (other recorded names: Hanakeola, Hana Keola Allen-Kinimaka, Hannah Keolaokalaau, Hannah Keolaokalaau Allen) (mother)

Mary Haʻaheo Atcherley (born Mary Ha'aheo Kinimaka, April 24, 1874 – March 8, 1933) was a Hawaiian activist. She was one of the first native Hawaiian women to run for public office in the Territory of Hawaii.

== Early life ==
Mary Ha'aheo Kinimaka was born on King Street in Honolulu in 1874 to David Leleo Kinimaka, a Hawaiian noble, and Hannah Keolaokalaau (also known as Hanakeola, or Hana Keola Allen-Kinimaka, 1854–1893).

She attended Kawaiaha'o Seminary for Girls between 1879 and 1881 or 1882. At age six, she became the hānai child of King Kalākaua. She lived in the royal household until age sixteen and finished her education at St. Andrew's Priory. After the king died, Kinimaka lived with her mother, as her father had died in 1884.

In 1893, she met her mother's doctor, Dr. John Atcherley (1865–1940), an Englishman from Liverpool who had come to the islands to manage his brother-in-law's medical practice. Mary Kinimaka married John Atcherley in 1894 in Kawaiae, Hawaii. The couple had four sons, one of whom did not survive to adulthood, and three daughters.

In 1897, Atcherley became the sole owner of two ahapua'a in Kona, Hawaii. She was involved in legal disputes relating to land throughout 1915, including one decided by the United States Supreme Court.

The family moved around often. In 1908, they lived in Honolulu, and, after a series of legal disputes relating to John Atcherley's confinement in an insane asylum, they moved to San Francisco in 1910 and to Vancouver in 1911 (where their youngest daughter, the goddaughter of Queen Lili'uokalani, was born). Dr. Atcherley worked for the Canadian Pacific Railway Company before joining the Royal Canadian Navy when World War I began in 1914. On the home front, Atcherley hosted Hawaiian-themed fundraisers for the war effort, often leading her children in performing Hawaiian music.

The family moved back to the Hawaiian Islands to Molokai (where Dr. Atcherley was the county physician) before settling in Honolulu in 1928. Atcherley is buried at Diamond Head Memorial Park on the island of Oahu with her husband.

== Politics ==
Starting with letters to the editor in 1908, Atcherley became an outspoken activist for the rights of native Hawaiians, especially in regards to public health and mistreatment by government officials. In 1919, Atcherley attended demonstrations in support of women's suffrage.

In 1920, Atcherley ran as a Democratic Party candidate from Oahu in the primary election for the territory's senate. A 1920 article about her states: "Mrs. Atcherley stands for an act for the minimum standard [wage] and a living salary for all working girls and women, and for the amendment of the workingmen's compensation act."

The Territorial Secretary Colonel Curtis P. Iaukea did not know whether he was allowed to enter women's names on the ballot; the question was passed through the governor's cabinet to Attorney General Harry Irwin. The Attorney General stated that legally, women candidates were not eligible to be entered on the ballot because they were not eligible under Section 34 of the Hawaiian Organic Act, (Pub.L. 56–339, 31 Stat. 141), an organic act enacted by the United States Congress to establish the government and legislature of the Territory enacted on April 30, 1900. Section 34 reads as follows:

SEC . 34. That in order to be eligible to election as a senator a person shall-

Be a male citizen of the United States;

Have attained the age of thirty years;

Have resided in the Hawaiian Islands not less than three years and

be qualified to vote for senators in the district from which he is elected.

The women were therefore legally allowed to remain on the ballot, but if they had been elected, would not have been able to hold office. The Attorney General suggested another citizen propose a test case for submission to the Supreme Court. Atcherley's name remained on the ticket, but she did not get elected.

Atcherley ran again in 1922, but was only expected to receive 800 votes. The issue of eligibility remained unclear: women were allowed to run for territorial offices, but the question of whether they were allowed to hold territorial offices would be determined by the members of the United States Congress. In September 1922, a bill passed allowing women to hold elected office in the territory of Hawaii: newspapers specifically mentioned that Atcherley's campaign had brought attention to this issue.

Throughout the 1920s, she petitioned the government regarding various issues, including land use.

One obituary notes, "Mrs. Atcherley never achieved any outstanding political honors although she aspired to many places of public service" though "in her efforts on behalf of her own people, the Hawaiians, her steps never lagged, her voice was never stilled. She was an uncompromising champion of what she regarded were their rights."

== Linguistic contributions ==
Atcherley, who grew up speaking Hawaiian with the royal family, taught classes in Hawaiian language in Molokai and Oahu during the 1920s and wrote her own textbooks. In 1923, the Territorial Legislature passed Act 243 ("an act to provide for the preparation and publication of a school text book in the Hawaiian language"); Atcherley's First Book in Hawaiian: a Text Book in the Hawaiian Language was selected as the final textbook and published by the Territorial Government in 1930 for use in schools across Hawaii.
