= Judy Tzu-Chun Wu =

American historian

- Education: Stanford University (PhD)
- Occupations: Activist, historian, and Asian American studies professor
- Employer: University of California, Irvine

Judy Tzu-Chun Wu is an activist, historian, and professor of Asian American history at the University of California, Irvine, where she also serves as the director of the Humanities Center. Her main areas of research include U.S. history, Asian Americans, imperialism, decolonization, gender, and sexuality.

== Education and career ==
She received her PhD in U.S. History from Stanford University in 1998. She taught at Ohio State University from 1998 to 2015 and at the University of Chicago from 2005 to 2006. She is a professor of history and Asian American studies at UC Irvine, where she is also associate dean of the School of Humanities, director of the Humanities Center, and director of the Center for Liberation, Anti-Racism, and Belonging (C-LAB).

Aside from teaching, she has been involved in a variety of educational efforts, such as speaking on C-SPAN, participating in the National Women's History Museum Speakers Bureau, advocating for Asian American and Pacific Islander education at Stanford University through SAPAAC (Strengthening Asian American Studies at Stanford), working as an advisor for Beginnings of Activism for the Department of Asian American Studies (BADAAS) at UC Irvine, writing for Time magazine, writing for Ms., and editing for Amerasia Journal. She is featured in the 2020 Unladylike film about Margaret Chung, the first known American-born Chinese female doctor.

Wu also contributes to a variety of activist projects and organizational efforts. She serves as faculty director of the Stories by the Sea Project, a collaborative project between the UCI Humanities Center, Newport Beach Library Foundation, UCI Center for Storytelling, UCI Libraries, and UCI History Department. This project asks students to conduct interviews about formative memories of the sea. She is also a research lead for the Learning From Our AAPI Leaders Project at UC Irvine and a project lead for the Visualizing Our Identities and Cultures for Empowerment Project (VOICE). She is one of the Faculty Principal Investigators/Mentors for the #EmpireSuffrageSyllabus project, a collaborative database by faculty at the University of California and the Women and Social Movements journal published by Alexander Street/ProQuest that contains a collection of modules and resources with the purpose of rethinking women's suffrage in the United States. She is also a project lead for Sharing Comfort and Care at UC Irvine, a project dedicated to representing intergenerational connections using migration and food, with a particular focus on Cambodians and Native Hawaiians/Pacific Islanders.

== Works ==
=== Books ===
- Dr. Mom Chung of the Fair-Haired Bastards: A Life of a Wartime Celebrity (2005)
- Radicals on the Road: Internationalism, Orientalism, and Feminism during the Vietnam Era (2013)
- Women's America: Refocusing the Past, 8th ed. (co-edited with Linda K. Kerber, Jane Sherron De Hart, and Cornelia Hughes Dayton, 2015)
- Gendering the Trans-Pacific World (co-edited with Catherine Ceniza Choy, 2017)
- Fierce and Fearless: Patsy Takemoto Mink, First Woman of Color in Congress (with Gwendolyn Mink, 2022)
- Moving Mountains: Asian American and Pacific Islander Feminisms and the 1977 National Women's Conference (with Adrienne A. Winans, 2026)

=== Multi-media essays ===
- "The Takeover: May 15, 1989", May–April 2009
- "A Trip Down Immigration Lane," October 2010

== Awards ==
- Dynamic Womxn of the Year, University of California, Irvine (2021)
- National Endowment for the Humanities Collaborative Research Grant (2022)
