= United States House Committee on Woman Suffrage =

The Committee on Woman Suffrage was a committee of the United States House of Representatives between 1917 and 1927. The committee was influential in shepherding through the ratification of the 19th Amendment to the United States Constitution giving women the right to vote.

== Jurisdiction ==
The resolution establishing the Committee on Woman Suffrage gave it jurisdiction over any proposed legislation related to woman suffrage, an issue that had been the jurisdiction of the Judiciary Committee.

== History ==
Petition from Carrie Chapman Catt of the National American Woman Suffrage Association

Suffragist Carrie Chapman Catt petitioned Speaker of the House Champ Clark on behalf of the National American Woman Suffrage Association on April 10, 1917, urging the House to create a Committee on Woman Suffrage. She argued that the Judiciary Committee, which had jurisdiction over the issue, was too busy with other matters to address suffrage for women. During a May 18, 1917 hearing, numerous Representatives, including Jeannette Rankin, the only female member of the House, urged the House Rules Committee to create the Committee on Woman Suffrage. The U.S. Senate had established the Select Committee on Woman Suffrage in 1882.

On September 24, 1917, House Resolution 12, establishing a Committee on Woman Suffrage, was passed. Representative John Edward Raker, a Democrat from California, served as the Committee's chairman. At least one newspaper reported that Rankin had been passed over to chair the Committee after the Republican caucus failed to endorse her.

The Committee held its first session on January 3, 1918, and heard testimony from Carrie Chapman Catt, Anna Howard Shaw, and others in favor of the constitutional amendment for woman suffrage. On January 8, the Committee ordered a favorable report on the amendment. The following day, President Woodrow Wilson publicly declared support for the amendment, and on January 10, the House of Representatives passed the federal woman suffrage amendment by two-thirds majority. The Senate failed to pass an amendment, so the House voted again to pass the woman suffrage amendment, which would become the 19th Amendment, on May 21, 1919. The Committee's final report was on H.J. Res. 1, which became the 19th Amendment to the Constitution. Though the Committee existed until 1927, it ceased activities following the ratification of the 19th Amendment in 1920.

== See also ==
- United States Senate Select Committee on Woman Suffrage
- Women's suffrage in the United States
