= Lahilahi Webb =

Hawaiian royal lady-in-waiting (1862–1949)

- Lahilahi Webb in 1936
- Born: April 12, 1862; Honolulu, Oahu, Kingdom of Hawaii
- Died: January 2, 1949 (aged 86)
- Known for: serving as the final lady-in-waiting and companion of Queen Liliuokalani from 1914 to 1917
- Spouse: Harry Hogson Webb

Lahilahi Webb (Elizabeth Kealiioiwikinolahilahi Napuaikaumakani Rogers Webb, April 12, 1862 – January 2, 1949) was the last lady-in-waiting and companion of Queen Liliuokalani from 1914 to 1917 during the final years of the queen's life. She also worked as a guide and cultural ambassador for the Bernice Pauahi Bishop Museum.

== Life ==
She was born in Honolulu, on April 12, 1862. Her parents were Charles Vincent Rogers and Halauai Kekahupuu Rogers. Her name Lahilahi means "thin as beaten gold" in the Hawaiian language. According to historian Helena G. Allen, she was an adopted granddaughter of Don Francisco de Paula Marín, an influential figure during the reign of King Kamehameha I. Hawaiian businessman and politician John F. Colburn was mentioned as her cousin while his wife Julia Naoho Colburn was referred to as her aunt. She was educated at the Old Fort Street School and later St. Andrew's Priory School. As a young girl in 1875, she witnessed the funeral procession of King Lunalilo to the newly built Lunalilo Mausoleum at Kawaiahaʻo Church including the famous twenty-one rapid thunderclaps which echoed across Honolulu in place of the 21-gun salute denied to him by King Kalākaua.

On May 21, 1891, she married Captain Harry Hogson Webb (born 1846 in Bangor, Maine), who had settled in the Hawaiian Islands during the reign of King Kamehameha V. Following the overthrow of the Hawaiian Kingdom in 1893, she became a member of Hui Aloha ʻĀina o Na Wahine (Hawaiian Women's Patriotic League) or Hui Aloha ʻĀina for Women. This patriotic group was founded to oppose the overthrow and plans to annex the islands to the United States and to support the deposed Queen Liliuokalani. In 1917, the Webb couple were living at Washington Place where Captain Webb was an assistant of Colonel Curtis P. Iaukea and also a close friend of Queen Liliuokalani.

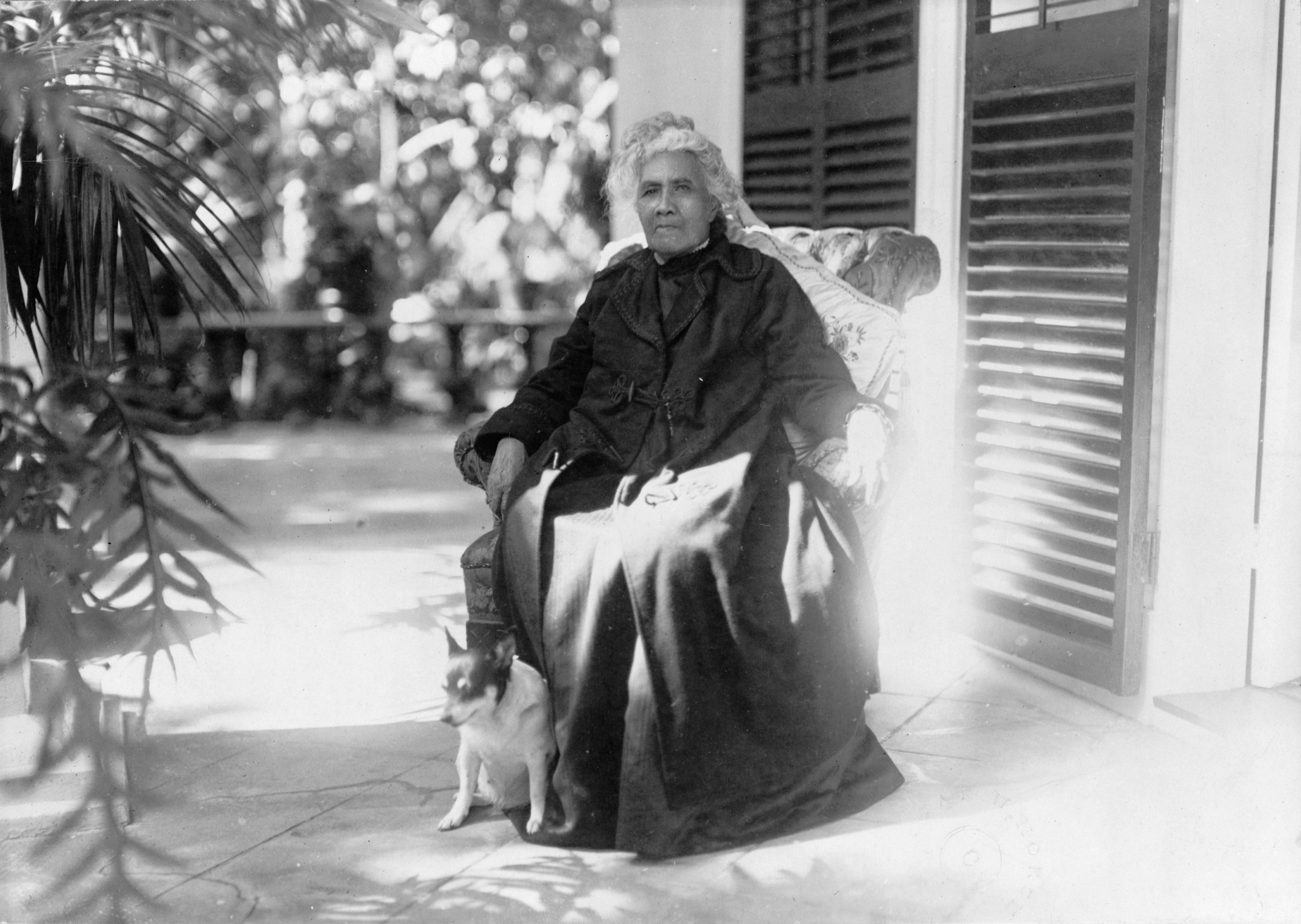
Liliʻuokalani seated with her dog Poni on the lanai of Washington Place in 1917

From 1914 to 1917, Webb served as the final lady-in-waiting to Queen Liliuokalani. She became one of the only confidantes and close companions of the queen for most of her later life. She was present at her deathbed when the queen died on November 12, 1917, at Washington Place. She also stood vigil by the queen's casket while her body laid in the Royal Mausoleum prior to her final interment in the vault of the Kalākaua Crypt. After the queen's death, she was given ownership of the queen's dog Poni, who was named after the Hawaiian word for "coronation". This dog had been Liliuokalani's constant companion up till her final illness and death. The Honolulu Star-Bulletin wrote:

Poni, small treasured descendant of many canine tribes, banished from the beloved presence of the queen by her death, has found a comforter in Mrs. Lahilahi Webb, who, through the expressed wish of Her Majesty a few weeks before her death, is now Poni's mistress. The dog was the queen's constant companion to her death

For the latter part of her life, Lahilahi Webb worked at the Bernice Pauahi Bishop Museum as a guide and cultural ambassador to the exhibits. She joined the museum staff on August 11, 1919, and became a respected authority figure in the Hawaiian community because of her intimate knowledge and memories of the court of the monarchy. She was also involved in many local organizations in Hawaii including the Kaahumanu Society, in which she acted as an elected secretary and assistant secretary for the organization, the Daughters of Hawaii, Kapiolani Maternity Hospital, the Hawaiian Board of Missions, the Outdoor Circle, and the St. Andrew's Priory Alumnae. She died on January 2, 1949, at the age of 86. Webb Lane and Lahilahi Lane in Honolulu were named after her.

== Bibliography ==
- Allen, Helena G. (1982). The Betrayal of Liliuokalani: Last Queen of Hawaii, 1838–1917. Glendale, CA: A. H. Clark Company. ISBN 978-0-87062-144-4. OCLC 9576325.
- Buck, Peter Henry (1950). Report of the Director for 1949. Honolulu: Bernice P. Bishop Museum. OCLC 12196944.
- Clark, T. Blake (March 1939). "Honolulu's Streets". Papers of the Hawaiian Historical Society (20). Honolulu: The Bulletin Publishing Company: 5–25. hdl:10524/967. OCLC 1773152.
- Galuteria, Peter (1993) [1991]. Lunalilo (Revised ed.). Honolulu: Kamehameha Schools/Bernice Pauahi Bishop Estate. ISBN 978-0-87336-019-7. OCLC 32857010.
- Kuykendall, Ralph Simpson (1967). The Hawaiian Kingdom 1874–1893, The Kalakaua Dynasty. Vol. 3. Honolulu: University of Hawaii Press. ISBN 978-0-87022-433-1. OCLC 500374815.
- Silva, Noenoe K. (2004). Aloha Betrayed: Native Hawaiian Resistance to American Colonialism. Durham: Duke University Press. ISBN 978-0-8223-8622-3. OCLC 191222123.
