= Almira Hollander Pitman =

American suffragist and women's rights activist

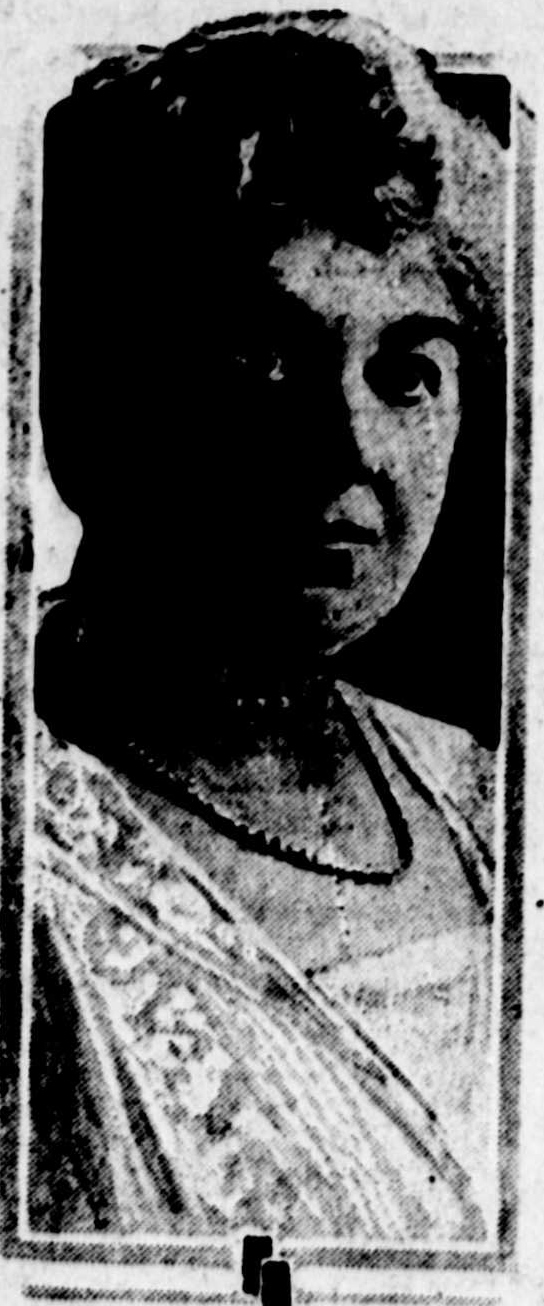
Almira Hollander Pitman, The Evening Herald, 1918

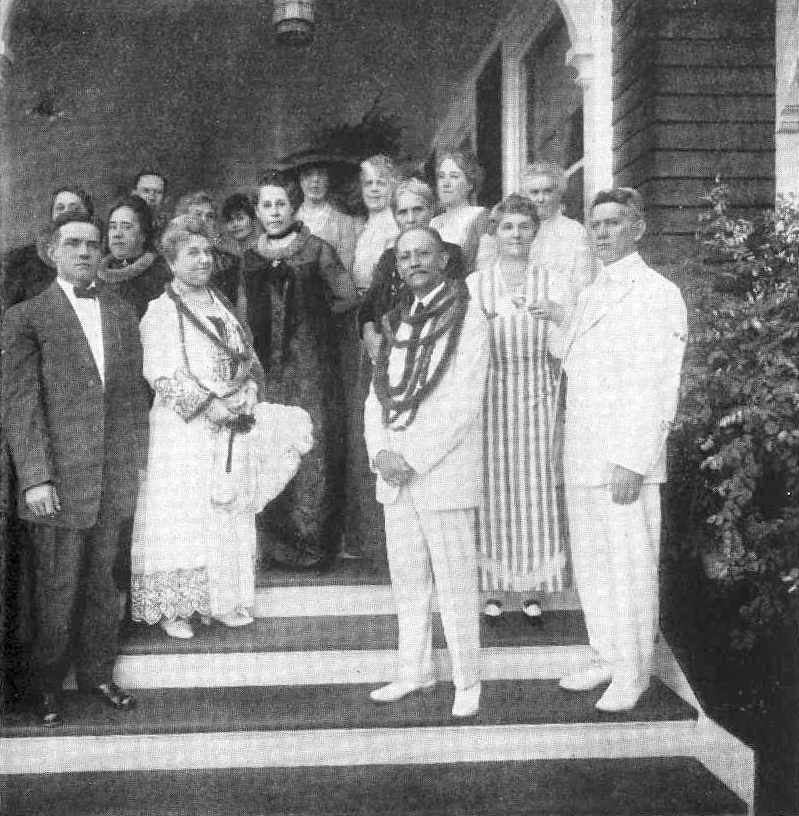
Almira and Benjamin Pitman with a group during their visit to Hawaii in 1917

Almira Hollander Pitman (1854 – December 17, 1939) was an American suffragist and women's rights activist. Pitman was largely active in New England and Massachusetts suffrage organizations. She was also instrumental in working for women's suffrage in Hawaii. Pitman was also known for her writing.

== Biography ==
Almira "Mira" Hollander was born in Massachusetts in 1854 and grew up in Brookline. She married Benjamin Franklin Keolaokalani Pitman, who was the son of Benjamin Pitman, in 1875. Born in the Kingdom of Hawaii, Benjamin F. K. Pitman was of Native Hawaiian noble descent and the son of Kinoʻoleoliliha, a high chiefess of Hilo.

Almira Pitman became involved with women's suffrage in 1884 when she joined the New England Woman Suffrage Association (NEWSA). She went on to become the recording secretary of the Brookline Suffrage Association and in 1913, chair of the Ways and Means Committee of the Massachusetts Woman Suffrage Association (MWSA). Pitman was in charge of the Bay State Suffrage Festivals 1913, 1915, and 1919, helping to raise money for suffrage organizations.

Pitman and her husband visited Hawaii for six weeks starting on January 29, 1917. The couple was received warmly by her husband's Hawaiian extended family and he was honored as a descendant of Hawaiian chiefs. Pitman, who was already known to suffragists in Hawaii as an activist, was invited to speak around the islands. Pitman spoke to nearly all of the members of the territorial legislature about women's suffrage. She also promised suffragists that she would advocate for Hawaii's right to determine women's suffrage.

In 1917, a bill was presented by Prince Jonah Kūhiō Kalanianaʻole to the United States Congress to allow Hawaii to legislate on suffrage. Pitman, Anna Howard Shaw and Maud Wood Park all testified in front of the House Committee on Woman Suffrage about the bill on April 29, 1918. When the bill passed in June, Pitman was given credit for helping its passage.

After the passage of the Nineteenth Amendment, Pitman remained an activist for women's rights. She was also active in political groups, being a member of the Women's Republican Club of Massachusetts.

She and Benjamin F. K. Pitman had two sons. The elder son Benjamin attended Harvard College, and their younger son Theodore Pitman became a sculptor, dedicating a monument to his ancestors in 1928. Another Theodore, their great-grandson, donated a manuscript of notes from 1836 to 1861 to the Bishop Museum in 2007.

Pitman died on December 17, 1939, in Brookline.

== Writing ==
- "The Turnip and the Rose". Woman's Journal: 56. April 3, 1909 – via Nineteenth Century Collections Online.
- "In Freedom's Land". Woman's Journal: 34. February 3, 1912 – via Nineteenth Century Collections Online.
- After Fifty Years: An Appreciation, and a Record of a Unique Incident. Norwood, Massachusetts: The Plimpton Press. 1931. OCLC 3703871.
