= List of first women lawyers and judges in Hawaii =

This is a list of the first women lawyer(s) and judge(s) in Hawaii. It includes the year in which the women were admitted to practice law (in parentheses). Also included are women who achieved other distinctions such becoming the first in their state to graduate from law school or become a political figure.

== Firsts in Hawaii's history ==
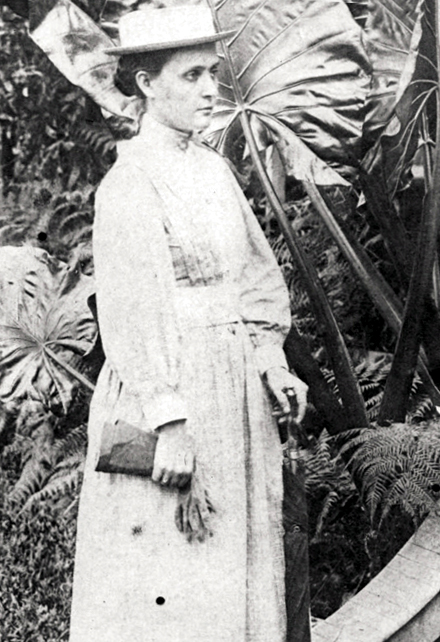
Almeda Eliza Hitchcock: First female lawyer in Hawaii (1888)

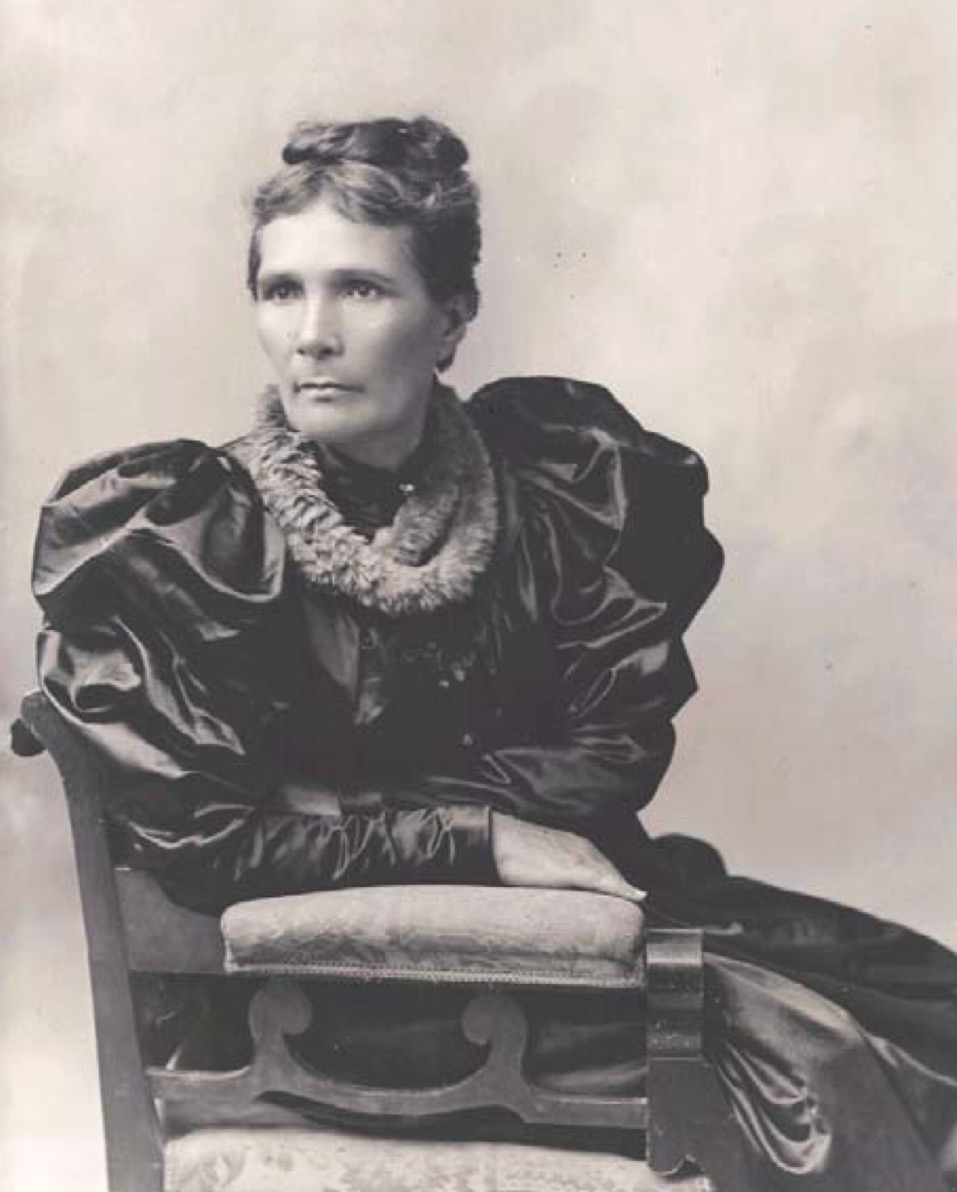
Emma Kaili Metcalf Beckley Nakuina: Regarded as the first female judge in Hawaii (1892)

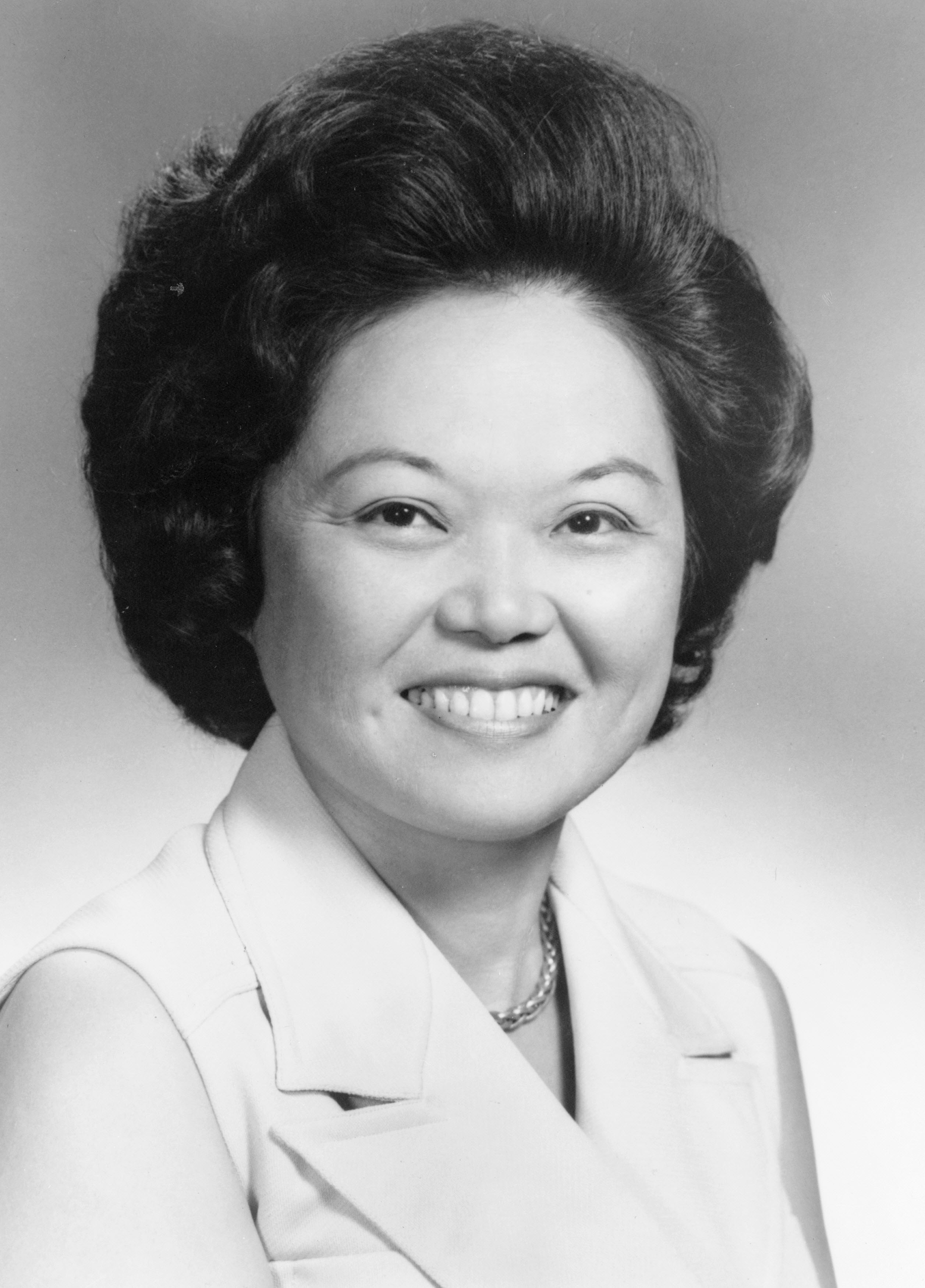
Patsy Mink: First Asian American female lawyer in Hawaii (1953)

=== Law School ===
- First Hawaiian Nisei female law graduate: Patsy Mink (1953) in 1951

=== Lawyers ===
- First female (prior to overthrow of the Kingdom of Hawaii): Almeda Eliza Hitchcock (1888)
- First female (sign the “Roll of Attorneys” for the federal district court): Elizabeth Helena Ryan (1896) in 1900
- First female (practicing in the Territory of Hawaii): Marguerite Kamehaokalani Ashford (1916)
- First Asian American female: Sau Ung Loo Chan (1942)
- First Japanese American female: Patsy Mink (1953)
- First Samoan-born female: Saisamoa F. Grey Price (2017)

=== State judges ===
- First female (Supreme Court of the Hawaiian Kingdom): Miriam Kekāuluohi in 1840
- First female (Commissioner of Private Ways and Water Rights): Emma Kaili Metcalf Beckley Nakuina from 1892-1907
- First female (Hawaii Supreme Court): Carrick Hume Buck (1921) in 1935
- First female (district magistrate): Edna Jenkins in 1937
- First female: Carrick Hume Buck (1921) in 1934
- First Asian American female: Marybeth Yuen Maul circa 1957
- First female (appointed; Supreme Court of Hawaii): Rhoda Valentine Lewis (c. 1929) in 1959
- First female (family court): Betty Vitousek in 1970
- First female (circuit court): Marie Milks in 1984
- First African American female: Sandra A. Simms in 1991
- First female (Second Circuit Court): Harriette L. Holt in 1990
- First openly lesbian female (Hawaii Supreme Court): Sabrina McKenna (1982) in 2011
- First female of Native Hawaiian descent (Hawaii Intermediate Court of Appeals): Sonja McCullen in 2021

=== Federal judges ===
- First female (U.S. District Court for the District of Hawaii): Helen W. Gillmor in 1994
- First Asian American female (U.S. District Court for the District of Hawaii): Susan Oki Mollway (1981) in 1998
- First Native Hawaiian female (United States District Court for the District of Hawaii): Shanlyn A. S. Park in 2023

=== Attorney General of Hawaii ===
- First female (partial term): Corinne K.A. Watanabe (1974) from 1985-1987
- First female (full term): Margery Bronster (1982) from 1995-1999

=== Deputy Attorney General ===
- First female: Marguerite Kamehaokalani Ashford (1916) in 1925

=== United States Attorney ===
- First female: Florence T. Nakakuni in 2009

=== Assistant United States Attorney ===
- First female: Carrick Hume Buck (1921) in 1925

=== Political Office ===
- First Asian-born (Japanese descent) female (senator): Mazie Hirono (1978) in 2012

=== Hawaii Bar Association ===
- First female president: Sherry Broder (1975)

== Firsts in local history ==
- Carrick Hume Buck (1921): First female to serve as the Assistant District Attorney and Deputy City and County Attorney for Honolulu City-County, Hawaii (1925)
- Jean Vaughan Gilbert (1944): First female to serve as the Honolulu City-County Attorney
- Camille A. Nelson: First (African American) female to serve as the Dean of the University of Hawaii’s William S. Richardson School of Law (2020)
- Edna Jenkins: First female to serve as the district magistrate for Makawao, Hawaii (1937) [Maui County, Hawaii]
- Linda Breslau Berg: First female lawyer in Maui [Maui County, Hawaii]

== See also ==
- List of first women lawyers and judges in the United States
- Timeline of women lawyers in the United States
- Women in law

== Other topics of interest ==
- List of first minority male lawyers and judges in the United States
- List of first minority male lawyers and judges in Hawaii
