= Helen Lake Kanahele =

American labor organizer (1916–1976)

- Born: Helen Lake; May 26, 1916; Kona, Hawaii
- Died: June 12, 1976 (aged 60); Honolulu, Hawaii
- Occupations: Trade worker, labor organizer
- Spouse: Alfred Kanahele
- Children: Mary Jane, Helen

Helen Lake Kanahele (May 26, 1916 – June 12, 1976) was a Hawaiian labor organizer. She was president of the Women's Auxiliary of the International Longshoreman's and Warehousemen's Union (ILWU) and worked with the United Public Workers union. Due to her labor organizing and opposition to the death penalty, Kanahele was subpoenaed by the Territorial Committee on Subversive Activities in the 1950s.

== Early life and family ==
Helen Lake was born on May 26, 1916, in Kona, Hawaii, to a Hawaiian mother and an English father. She recounted that her father died when she was five followed by her mother the following year. She was raised by Irene Woods as a hānai child.

Lake was formally educated at Honolulu's Central Intermediate School up through the eighth grade. She had a talent for singing and hula. She was recruited by a professional troupe and toured the world three times with the E.K. Fernandez Shows. She was considered ready for the shows at the age of six and a half. During one of the later tours, she was dismayed at the "no colored" signs the troupe encountered throughout the Southern United States. At the age of 12, she assisted in the political campaigns of Democratic Party candidates.

Lake married Alfred Kanahele when she was in her 20s. She had two daughters, Mary Jane and Helen. Alfred abandoned the family in a few years.

== Career ==
In 1947 Kanahele was working for the Democratic Party when she met labor organizer Henry Epstein, who was working with the United Public Workers.

Kanahele started work in Maluhia Hospital's laundry in Honolulu in 1948. The next year she lived in Papakolea in a Hawaiian Homestead house with her hānai brother and her two daughters. Her brother was participating in a strike by International Longshore and Warehouse Union (ILWU) dockworkers. She visited him at the union's headquarters at Pier 11 and encountered a group of two hundred haole women who were against the strike. She joined the counterpicket line of union women. In the following days, she joined the Women's Auxiliary's pickets. She cooked food in the strike kitchens and delivered it to the homes of strikers. By 1951 she was elected president of the Women's Auxiliary.

Kanahele joined the United Public Workers in 1949. She became the Territorial secretary-treasurer of UPW in 1952. She signed up the second most members for the union in a Territory-wide organizing drive in 1955.

During the summer of 1951, Kanahele's focus turned to the death penalty with the looming hanging of John Palakiko and James Majors for the Morgan's Corner murder. She compared the case with the Massie Trial and thought of how there were separate systems of justice for native Hawaiians and the upper crust haoles. She sought the assistance of attorney Harriet Bouslog and made an appeal on the radio on behalf of the men days before their scheduled execution.

== Death ==
Following a long illness, Kanahele died in Honolulu on June 12, 1976.

In March 2017, Hawaiʻi Magazine ranked her among a list of the most influential women in Hawaiian history.
