= Almeda Eliza Hitchcock =

American lawyer (1863–1895)

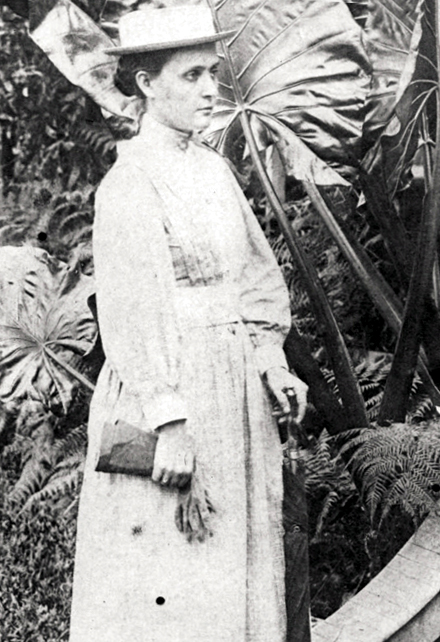
- Almeda Eliza Hitchcock, c. 1886
- Born: December 5, 1863. Hilo, Hawaii Island, Hawaiian Kingdom
- Died: May 9, 1895 (aged 31); Hilo, Hawaii Island, Hawaiian Kingdom
- Occupation: Lawyer
- Known for: First female lawyer and notary public in the Hawaiian Kingdom
- Spouse: William Levi Moore

Almeda Eliza Hitchcock Moore (December 5, 1863 – May 9, 1895) was the first female lawyer and notary public in the Hawaiian Kingdom in 1888.

== Life and career ==
Almeda Eliza Hitchcock was born on December 5, 1863, in Hilo, on the island of Hawaii, into a missionary family. Her paternal grandparents Harvey Rexford Hitchcock (1800–1855) and Rebecca Howard (1808–1890) were American Protestant missionaries who settled in the Hawaiian Kingdom in 1832. Her parents were David Howard Hitchcock (1831–1899), a lawyer and legislator in the legislature of the Hawaiian Kingdom, and Almeda Eliza Widger (1828–1895). Her older brother was Volcano School painter D. Howard Hitchcock. To family and friends, she was known as Alme.

She was educated at home and possibly the local private schools for children of foreign descent until the age of fifteen and attended the Oahu College (present day Punahou School) from 1879 to 1881 with her sister Cora Etta. She began studying law under her father in 1884 and decided to attend law school after meeting American lawyer Cora Agnes Benneson. From 1886 to 1888, Hitchcock studied law at the University of Michigan Law School in Ann Arbor and graduated with honor as class prophet. She was admitted to the Michigan bar on December 27, 1887, before her graduation. She was the only woman in the 143 graduates of her law class. After her graduation, she and her mother traveled to the Eastern United States to visit family before returning to Hawaii via San Francisco.

On her return home while waiting in Honolulu for an interisland steamer to take her to Hilo, she applied to the Hawaiian bar on October 29, 1888. The decision was controversial since no women had been admitted to the bar before in the Kingdom but her father and King Kalākaua‘s Minister of Foreign Affairs Jonathan Austin recommended her. She was admitted by the Hawaii Supreme Court after she presented her Michigan license to Chief Justice Albert Francis Judd. Around the same time, she also applied to be a notary public which was approved by Minister of the Interior Lorrin A. Thurston. She became the first female lawyer and notary public in Hawaii. She joined as a partner in her father’s law firm in Hilo and continued her law practice. She assisted with office work and represented clients in local cases in Hilo while her father was off conducting his circuit in other parts of the island. The cases the firm was involved with included burglary, divorce, desertion, bankruptcy, and other areas of law.

On May 24, 1892, Hitchcock married American physician William Levi Moore whom she had met while he was studying medicine at the University of Michigan. They moved to Kohala, on Hawaii, and Kōloa, on Kauai, where Moore temporarily worked as governmental doctor. They returned to Hilo in June 1894. Prone to chronic health problems, her illness prevented her from continuing to work for her father. She died at her family home on May 9, 1895, of digestive problems, and was buried at the family plot at Homelani Cemetery in Hilo. It would not be until 1915 that the second female lawyer would appear in Hawaii, Marguerite Kamehaokalani Ashford, who was also an alumnus of the University of Michigan. In 1924, Carrick Hume Buck became the third female lawyer in Hawaii.

== See also ==
- List of first women lawyers and judges in Hawaii

== Bibliography ==
- Case, Suzanne Espenett (1992). "Almeda Eliza Hitchcock Moore". In Matsuda, Mari J. (ed.). Called from Within: Early Women Lawyers of Hawaiʻi. Honolulu: University of Hawaii Press. pp. 17–36. ISBN 978-0-8248-1448-9.
- Humme, June Hitchcock (1986). "Almeda Eliza Hitchcock—Wahine Loio, or Lady Lawyer". Hawaiian Journal of History. Vol. 20. Hawaii Historical Society. pp. 137–150. hdl:10524/408.
- Peterson, Barbara Bennett, ed. (1984). Notable Women of Hawaii. Honolulu: University of Hawaii Press. ISBN 978-0-8248-0820-4. OCLC 11030010.
