= Jill Otake =

American judge (born 1973)

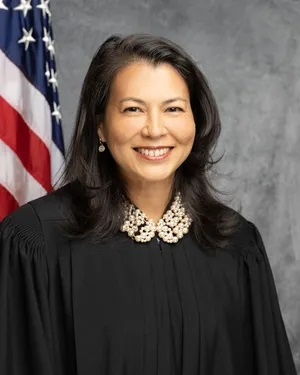

Judge of the United States District Court for the District of Hawaii
- Incumbent
- Assumed office August 3, 2018
- Appointed by: Donald Trump
- Preceded by: Susan Oki Mollway

Personal details
- Born: Jill Aiko Otake; 1973 (age 52–53) Honolulu, Hawaii, U.S.
- Education: Georgetown University (BS); University of Washington (JD)

Jill Aiko Otake (born 1973) is a United States district judge of the United States District Court for the District of Hawaii.

== Biography ==
Jill Otake was born in 1973, in Honolulu. She graduated from the ʻIolani School and earned a Bachelor of Science, cum laude, from Georgetown University, where she majored in the Russian language. Otake received her Juris Doctor from the University of Washington School of Law in 1998 and was selected for the Order of Barristers.

After graduating from law school, Otake clerked for Associate Justice Simeon R. Acoba Jr. of the Hawaii Supreme Court. She worked for five years as a deputy prosecuting attorney in King County, Washington. Otake then spent nine years as a supervisor and as an assistant United States attorney for the Western District of Washington.

Immediately before becoming a judge, Otake was Special Counsel to the United States Attorney and Acting Chief of the Special Crime section as an assistant United States attorney for the District of Hawaii. She was deputy chief of that office from 2014 to 2018.

Otake is a recipient of the Federal Bureau of Investigation Certificate of Recognition, Internal Revenue Service Excellence Award, and numerous U.S. Department of Justice Performance Awards. Otake was an instructor for the inaugural Hawaii Federal Trial Academy, sponsored by the Federal Bar Association and the United States District Court for the District of Hawaii.

Otake is co-chair of the Hawaii State Bar Association's Professionalism and Risk Management Committee and was also a volunteer attorney for Volunteer Legal Services Hawaii. She is also a mentor for Hawaii women lawyers. Otake has taught trial advocacy at Seattle University Law School; served as co-president of the Asian Bar Association of Washington; and served on the United States District Court for the District of Hawaii's Chief Probation Officer Selection Committee. She was a fellow of the 2016 Hawaii State Bar Association's Leadership Institute. She currently serves on the 'Iolani School Board of Governors.

== Federal judicial service ==
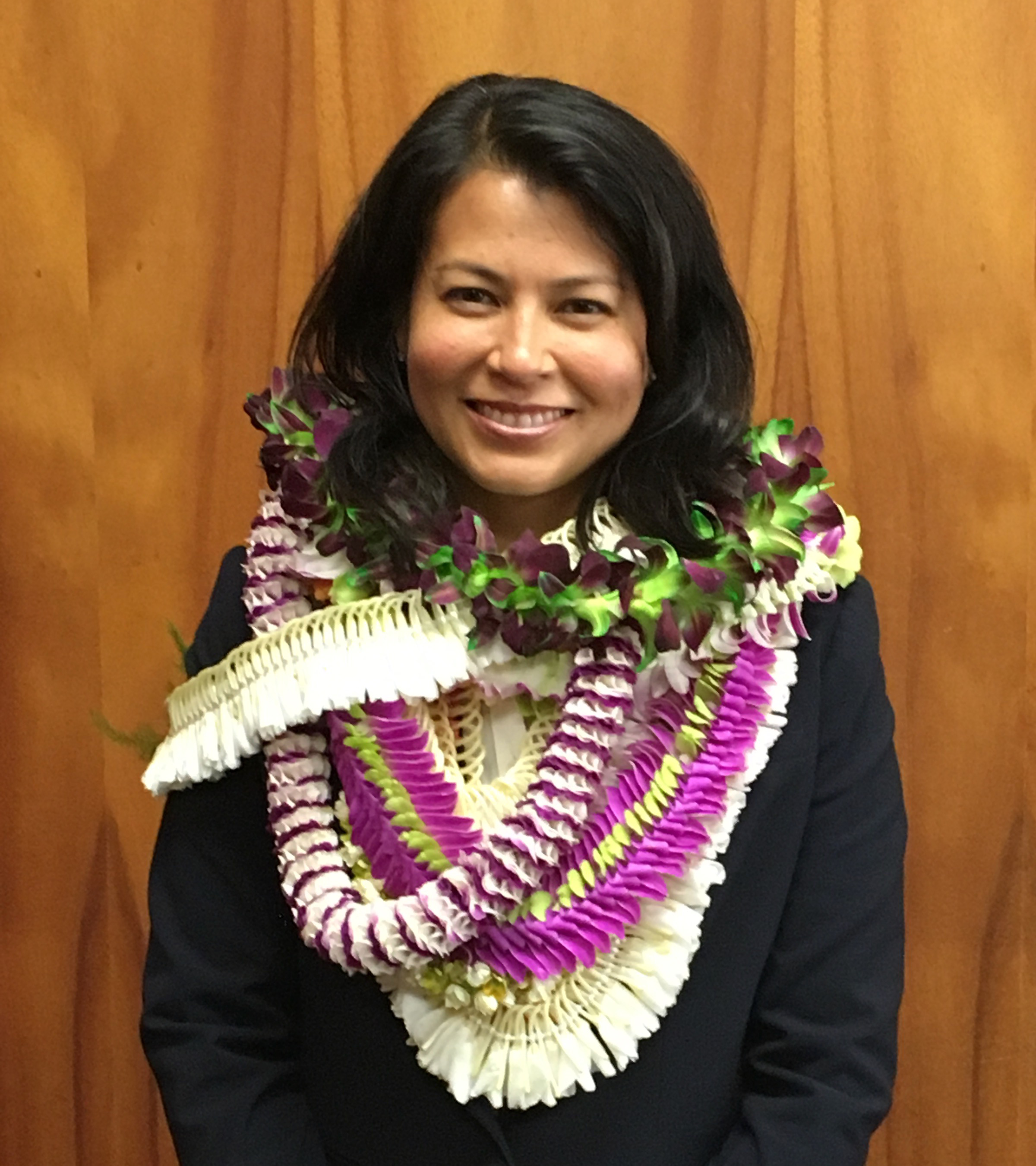
Judge Jill A. Otake is honored in the Aloha Tradition after taking the oath of office.

Otake was recommended to the White House by U.S. Senators Mazie Hirono and Brian Schatz. On December 21, 2017, her nomination was sent to the United States Senate. On December 20, 2017, President Donald Trump announced his intent to nominate Otake to serve as a United States District Judge of the United States District Court for the District of Hawaii. She was nominated to the seat vacated by Judge Susan Oki Mollway, who assumed senior status on November 6, 2015. The American Bar Association's Standing Committee on the Federal Judiciary rated Otake unanimously "Well Qualified." On March 7, 2018, a hearing on her nomination was held before the Senate Judiciary Committee. On April 12, 2018, her nomination was reported out of committee by voice vote. On August 1, 2018, the Senate confirmed her nomination by a voice vote. She received her judicial commission on August 3, 2018.

== Personal life ==
Otake's younger brother is Thomas "Tommy" Otake, a defense attorney practicing in Hawaii.

== See also ==
- List of Asian American jurists

Legal offices
Preceded by Susan Oki Mollway	Judge of the United States District Court for the District of Hawaii; 2018–present	Incumbent
