= Susan Oki Mollway =

American judge (born 1950)

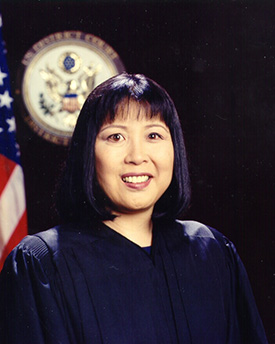

Senior Judge of the United States District Court for the District of Hawaii
- Incumbent
- Assumed office November 6, 2015

Chief Judge of the United States District Court for the District of Hawaii
- In office June 16, 2009 – November 6, 2015
- Preceded by: Helen W. Gillmor
- Succeeded by: John Michael Seabright

Judge of the United States District Court for the District of Hawaii
- In office August 4, 1998 – November 6, 2015
- Appointed by: Bill Clinton
- Preceded by: Harold Fong
- Succeeded by: Jill Otake

Personal details
- Born: Susan Naomi Oki; November 6, 1950 (age 76) Honolulu, Territory of Hawaii
- Education: University of Hawaiʻi (BA, MA); Harvard University (JD); Duke University (LLM)

Susan Naomi Oki Mollway (née Oki; born November 6, 1950) is a senior United States district judge of the United States District Court for the District of Hawaii and the first woman of East Asian descent and Japanese-American woman ever appointed to a life-time position on the federal bench.

== Early life and education ==
Born in Honolulu, Hawaii, Mollway earned a Bachelor of Arts degree in English literature from the University of Hawaiʻi in 1971 and a Master of Arts degree in English literature from the University of Hawaiʻi in 1973.

Before pursuing law, she taught both English literature and language at University of Hawaii and Takushoku University in Tokyo from 1973 to 1976. She graduated cum laude from Harvard Law School with a Juris Doctor in 1981, where she was the editor in chief of the Harvard Civil Rights-Civil Liberties Law Review In 2020, Mollway received her Master of Laws in judicial studies from Duke University School of Law.

=== Personal ===
She married Daniel Mollway and they have a son named Dylan Marcus.

== Professional career ==
Mollway taught English and worked at an English-language publisher in Tokyo from 1975 to 1977. From 1981 until 1989, she worked at Cades Schutte Fleming & Wright, a private legal practice, in Honolulu and became a partner for the law firm in 1986. From 1988 to 1989, she was an adjunct professor of law at the University of Hawaiʻi at Mānoa in the William S. Richardson School of Law.

=== Notable cases ===
==== Hawaiian Airlines, Inc. v. Norris ====
On June 20, 1994, Mollway successfully argued for the respondent, Norris, who was fired as an aircraft mechanic at Hawaiian Airlines due to his refusal to sign a maintenance record for a plane he deemed unsafe. The case was brought to the State Court as a violation of public policy expressed in federal statues, but it was later dismissed under the Railway Labor Act. However, the State Supreme Court reversed this claim in a unanimous decision. Mollway's argument affirmed the judgement that the Railway Labor Act does not preempt state law causes of action.

=== Publications ===
Mollway is the author of The First Fifteen: How Asian Women Became Federal Judges (Rutgers University Press 2021) which details the stories of the first fifteen Asian American women judges to be appointed to lifetime federal, judicial positions in autobiographical and biographical styles.

She is also a contributing author towards the biography collection Called from Within: Early Women Lawyers of Hawai'i (1992) which tells the early stories of the women lawyers admitted to Hawaii's bar before its statehood.

=== Associations ===
Mollway is a current member and director of multiple professional associations including:

- Hawaii Women Lawyer's Association
- Hawaii Women's Legal Foundation
- Federal Judges Association
- District Judges Association
- Hawai’i’ American Civil Liberties Union Board
- Hawaii State Bar
- American Judicature Society
- Judicial Conference Committee on Audits and Administrative Office Accountability

== Federal judicial service ==
=== Path to the bench ===
Mollway never perceived herself as disadvantaged due to Hawaii's multicultural environment. However, she only learned that she was the first Asian-American women to serve as an Article III federal judge after her nomination to the federal bench in 1998.

The process preceding Mollway's nomination to federal judgeship pended for two-and-a-half years and was a result of Mollway's identity, associations, and environment of the time. Following the announcement of her nomination, she received considerable scrutiny for her position on Hawai'i's American Civil Liberties Union Board, which openly and strongly supported the legalization of same-sex marriage, despite having never voted on a position the ACLU should take.

There was also pushback and ideological hazing from the Republican Senate at the time. In the last three months, they had only allowed one woman to be confirmed to the bench while confirming fifteen men. Mollway was not alone in the delay of her nomination as many other women and minority nominees faced delay by the Senate. In addition, the aftermath within the Senate, due to the 1996 presidential election, further prolonged her nomination and confirmation.

The difficulty of Mollway's confirmation process affected her private practice due to the pending nature of her nomination which made the number of clients willing to hire her shrink.

=== Nomination and confirmation ===
In December 1995, President Bill Clinton nominated Mollway to serve on the United States District Court for the District of Hawaii following the death of Judge Harold Fong. In 1996, the United States Senate lapsed her nomination. She wasn't renominated to the same seat until January 7, 1997.

The Senate confirmed Mollway on June 22, 1998 by a 56–34 vote, and she received her commission on June 23, 1998. She served as chief judge from 2009 to 2015. She assumed senior status on November 6, 2015. As of December 2025, Mollway appears to be inactive.

Mollway served on the Ninth Circuit Pacific Islands Committee and the Ninth Circuit Conference Executive Committee. Mollway was the chairperson of the 9th Circuit Jury Instructions Committee. Mollway helped to oversee the $121-million renovation of the federal district court facilities in Honolulu and worked on creating a Re-Entry program in the United States District Court, District of Hawaii.

=== Notable cases ===
==== United States v. Lee ====
In 2006, Mollway was the presiding judge over United States v. Lee, the largest trafficking prosecution case. The case was a result of a 22 count indictment against five defendants. They were charged for trafficking and subjecting workers in Samoa to involuntary servitude.USA V LEE, No. 05-10478 (9th Cir. 2006)

==== Day v Apoliona ====
In 2007, Mollway reinstated a previously dismissed lawsuit against the Office of Hawaiian Affairs by native Hawaiians. Six plaintiffs without native Hawaiian ancestry but high blood quantum filed a motion to intervene, aiming to safeguard the rights of a million Hawaiian residents to share in the ceded lands trust.

At the time, Mollway had a law clerk who was Native Hawaiian with high blood quantum of Native Hawaiian ancestry. As consequence, she received a motion from an attorney who wanted to bring a motion that that law clerk could not work on the case on the basis of prejudice. Mollway denied the motion claiming that the dispute was ruled on the basis of merit and that there was no personal interest in this case that would justify the attorney's motion.

Mollway determined that the plaintiffs lacked the right to challenge the constitutionality of federally mandated programs, thereby dismissing their case against Hawaiian homesteaders. The court ruled that limiting OHA elections solely to Hawaiian voters based on race was unconstitutional.

==== American Civil Liberties Union Hawaii lawsuit ====
In 2012, Mollway granted Hawaii prisoners the right to marry, ruling in favor of the American Civil Liberties Union. She ordered that the state could not interfere with the fundamental right to marriage.

==== County of Maui v Hawaii Wildlife Fund ====
In 2014, Mollway ruled in favor of environmental groups when they sued the County of Maui for discharging groundwater pollution without a permit. The Supreme Court addressed the decision in County of Maui v. Hawaii Wildlife Fund.

==== Conservation Council for Hawaii lawsuit ====
In 2015, Mollway again ruled in favor of environmentalists who accused the Navy of threatening marine mammals due to their use of sonar and explosives during training off Southern California and Hawaii. Mollway ruled that the National Marine Fisheries Service violated environmental laws.

== Awards ==
Throughout her career, Mollway has received a number of awards.

In 1987, the Hawaii Women Lawyers Association, a non-profit organization incorporated in 1982, awarded her the Outstanding Woman Lawyer of the Year Award and the Outstanding Judicial Achievement Award later in 2004. The organization is committed to improving the lives and careers of women attorneys and advancing their legal professions and promoting equal opportunity.

The following year, in 1987, she was awarded the Trailblazer Award by the National Asian Pacific American Bar Association which recognizes commendable commitment, achievements, and leaderships of Asian American Pacific Islander lawyers, simultaneously paving the way for AAPI attorneys.

In 1999, the University of Georgia School of Law invited Mollway to become an Edith House Lecturer. The Edith House Law Lecture Series aims to support the Women Law Students' Association at the University of Georgia School of Law by bringing forth women pioneers who have made significant advancements in the legal profession. Mollway discussed and analyzed her federal judicial confirmation process as a Japanese-American woman.

In 2000, the Harvard Asian American Intercollegiate Conference awarded Mollway the Heroes 2000 award.

In 2005, the Asian American Justice Center awarded her the Distinguished Service Award.

== See also ==
- List of Asian American jurists
- List of first women lawyers and judges in Hawaii
- List of first women lawyers and judges in the United States

== Sources ==
Legal offices
Preceded by Harold Fong	Judge of the United States District Court for the District of Hawaii; 1998–2015	Succeeded by Jill Otake
Preceded by Helen W. Gillmor	Chief Judge of the United States District Court for the District of Hawaii; 2009–2015	Succeeded by John Michael Seabright
