= Judge Bratton =

Judge Bratton may refer to:

- Howard C. Bratton (1922–2002), judge of the United States District Court for the District of New Mexico
- Sam G. Bratton (1888–1963), judge of the United States Court of Appeals for the Tenth Circuit
