= Henrietta Hume Pettijohn Buck =

American lawyer

- Born: Henrietta Hume; September 30, 1854; Columbia, Missouri, U.S.
- Died: October 11, 1921 (aged 67); Los Angeles, California, U.S.
- Education: University of Missouri
- Occupation: Lawyer

Henrietta Hume Pettijohn Buck (September 30, 1854 – October 11, 1921) was New Mexico’s first female lawyer.

She was born September 30, 1854, in Columbia, Missouri, the eldest of the five surviving children of James Robert Hume and Sallie Boothe. She attended the University of Missouri and initially began a career as a novelist when she wrote Etalee, From the Waves, After Many Years, and Dorothy. On April 15, 1892, she became the first woman admitted to practice law in New Mexico.

She married Dr J. B. Pettijohn from Las Vegas, New Mexico, and divorced him in 1893. They had one daughter, Cora Hume Pettijohn. She then married ranch owner Arthur P. Buck. Their daughter, Carrick Hume Buck, also became a prominent lawyer, and her distinguished career included becoming the first woman to serve as the Assistant U.S. District Attorney and a judge (including a Supreme Court Justice) in Hawaii.

== Death and legacy ==
Buck died on October 11, 1921, in Los Angeles, California. The New Mexico Women's Bar Association established the Henrietta Pettijohn Award in her name.

== See also ==
- List of first women lawyers and judges in New Mexico
- List of first women lawyers and judges in Hawaii
