= Eugene Black (Texas politician) =

American politician (1879–1975)

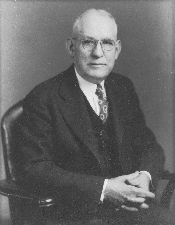

Member of the U.S. Board of Tax Appeals
- In office November 5, 1929 – November 30, 1953
- Preceded by: John B. Milliken
- Succeeded by: Morton P. Fisher

Member of the U.S. House of Representatives from Texas's 1st district
- In office March 4, 1915 – March 3, 1929
- Preceded by: Horace W. Vaughan
- Succeeded by: Wright Patman

Personal details
- Born: July 2, 1879 Blossom, Texas
- Died: May 22, 1975 (aged 95) Washington, D.C.
- Party: Democratic Party
- Education: Cumberland School of Law

Eugene Black (July 2, 1879 – May 22, 1975) was an American lawyer, teacher, and grocer who was the Democratic United States Representative from the First District of Texas from 1915 to 1929. In 1929 he was appointed by President Hoover to serve on the United States Board of Tax Appeals, on which he served until 1966.

Born near Blossom, Lamar County, Texas, Black attended Blossom's public schools and taught school in Lamar county from 1898 to 1900. Black was employed in the Blossom post office, and graduated from Cumberland School of Law in 1905. He was admitted to the bar the same year and commenced practice in Clarksville, Texas. He was also engaged in the wholesale grocery business. Black was elected as a Democrat to the 64th United States Congress and to the six succeeding congresses.

Black was an unsuccessful candidate for renomination in 1928, but was appointed by President Herbert Hoover to the United States Board of Tax Appeals on November 5, 1929, and served until March 31, 1966. Black resided in Washington, D.C., until his death there on May 22, 1975. He was interred in Cedar Hill Cemetery, Suitland, Maryland.

U.S. House of Representatives
Preceded by Horace Worth Vaughan	Member of the U.S. House of Representatives from Texas's 1st congressional district March 4, 1915 – March 3, 1929	Succeeded by Wright Patman
