= Marguerite Kamehaokalani Ashford =

American lawyer

Marguerite Kamehaokalani Ashford c.1930

Marguerite Kamehaokalani Ashford (December 9, 1891 – March 3, 1970) became the first woman attorney to practice in the Territory of Hawaii. At the time of her 1916 admission to the Hawaii bar, she was the only woman attorney in Hawaii. Almeda Eliza Hitchcock had previously practiced law in the islands while Hawaii was still a kingdom, but had ceased her practice before the 1893 overthrow of the Kingdom of Hawaii. The third woman attorney in Hawaii was Carrick Hume Buck who was admitted to the Hawaii bar in 1924, making Ashford and Buck the only two practicing women attorneys in the territory as of that date.

== Family background ==
She was born December 9, 1891, the youngest child of Jean Eleanor Robertson Ashford (1858–1926) and Clarence Wilder Ashford (1857–1921). Her mother was the first woman regent of the University of Hawaii and credited as securing funding for the original Cooke Field at the University of Hawaii.

Her father was an immigrant from Canada, who had replaced Antone Rosa as Kalākaua's Attorney General after the signing of the 1887 Constitution of the Kingdom of Hawaii. For his alliance with Liliʻuokalani during the overthrow, he spent seven years in exile in San Francisco, returning to Hawaii after its annexation by the United States. President Woodrow Wilson appointed him First Judge of First Circuit Court, District of Hawaii in 1914, a position he held until his retirement. Her brothers Stanley Haze Healani Ashford (1888–1968) and Huron Kanoelani Ashford (1890–1928) also entered the legal profession.

== Education and career ==
After graduating from Punahou School in Honolulu, Ashford matriculated at the University of California, where she earned her LLB in 1914. She then spent several weeks in Hawaii accompanying her father in his judicial duties, before enrolling at the University of Michigan, receiving her JD degree in 1915. Territorial Chief Justice Alexander George Morison Robertson administered the oath to her on January 27, 1916, and authorized her to practice in all courts in the territory. At the time of her admission to the bar, she was the only woman attorney in Hawaii, and the first in the territory to practice. Almeda Eliza Hitchcock (1863–1895) had previously practiced law in the islands while Hawaii was still a kingdom, but had ceased her practice before the 1893 overthrow of the Kingdom of Hawaii.

In February 1916, while still living in her parents' house and being financially supported by them, Ashford acted as the defense in a case in which her father presided over as the judge, raising conflict of interest concerns. By the following month, she had joined the law firm of Castle & Withington.

The third woman attorney in Hawaii, Carrick Hume Buck (1900–1959), was admitted to the Hawaii bar in 1924. At that time, Ashford and Buck were the only practicing women attorneys in the territory. Ashford was appointed First Deputy Attorney General in the territory in 1925, holding the position until 1927. For nearly two decades, she served as legal council for the territorial legislature. In 1934, she was appointed Deputy Attorney General for the whole legislature, holding that position until 1953. She was appointed attorney for the Territorial House of Representatives in 1935, for the purpose of drafting legislation. When she worked as counsel for the Territorial Senate, the newspaper stated that during the period she served in that position, she earned a higher salary than any other public servant.

== Public lands ==
The Republic of Hawaii was annexed by the United States on July 4, 1898. On June 14, 1900, the Hawaiian Organic Act officially created the territory and provided the constitutional framework under which it was governed. With the Hawaiian Homes Commission Act of 1921, the federal government set aside approximately 200,000 acres (810 km^{2}) in the territory as a land trust for homesteading by Native Hawaiians. Ashford held the opinion that the act discriminated against non-native Hawaiians, and, therefore, violated the United States Constitution. When Ashford was chosen as a delegate from Molokai to the 1950 Hawaiʻi State Constitutional Convention, she opposed inclusion of the 1921 Hawaiian Homes Commission Act into Hawaii's new constitution. When the convention failed to eliminate the act from the proposed constitution, she refused to sign it. Governor Samuel Wilder King appointed Ashford to his cabinet as Commissioner of Public Lands in 1953, stirring up public controversy. King never wavered in his support of her, but she eventually resigned from the position.

== Retirement ==
She retired from active law practice, and moved to Molokai in 1946, where she built a home in the Kainalu area. A tidal wave generated by the 1946 Aleutian Islands earthquake damaged much of the island, and dislodged her new house off its foundation, moving it and her car across the road. In August of that year, she was un-retired by Chief Justice Samuel B. Kemp, who appointed her to fill a District Magistrate vacancy on the island.

Ashford maintained close ties with Kemp, but was able to fully retire as his final term ran out. She moved to the Halekou area of Kaneohe to be near her remaining family, and died March 3, 1970.
