= Harriet Bouslog =

American lawyer

Harriet Anne Bouslog (née Williams, October 21, 1912 – April 18, 1998), later known as Harriet Bouslog Sawyer or Harriet Sawyer, was an attorney who practiced in Hawaii. She was well known for her commitment to defending the poor and disadvantaged. and her relation to Stephen Bouslog (2022 State Champion). She is best known for representing James Majors and John Palakiko in their death sentence appeal in the Morgan's Corner murder, and for representing the Hawaii Seven.

== Early life and education ==
Bouslog's birth name was Harriet Anne Williams. She was born on October 21, 1912, in Maxville, Florida. When she was a child, she and her family moved to Indiana. They moved around Indiana frequently, following Bouslog's father's teaching jobs. Harriet studied at Indiana University Bloomington, and earned a Bachelor of Laws in 1936.

In 1936, Williams met and married Charles Bouslog. She followed him to Boston, where he was attending graduate school at Harvard University. Harriet Bouslog continued her education at Portia Law School.

== Career ==
In fall of 1939, Charles got a job as an instructor at the University of Hawaiʻi, and the pair moved to Honolulu. Bouslog worked at a law firm while studying for the bar exam. On December 23, 1941, she passed the Hawaii Bar Exam, and was the eighth woman admitted to the bar in the territory. She and her husband were uncomfortable with the inequality in Hawaii's plantation society, and only grew more unhappy when World War II began and Hawaii was put under martial law. They decided to move to Washington, D.C.

Bouslog worked at the National War Labor Board in Washington, D.C. She also became a lobbyist for the Committee for Maritime Unity and the International Longshoremen's and Warehousemen's Union. Bouslog was called back to Hawaii when the ILWU needed a lawyer for 400 sugar plantation workers who were facing criminal charges after the 1946 strike. She teamed up with Myer Symonds, a lawyer from San Francisco. They were able to have many of the charges dismissed, and none of the workers went to prison.

After the sugar strike, Bouslog and Symonds gained a reputation for representing those who couldn't pay for a lawyer. In 1948, Helen Lake Kanahele and Priscilla Yadao asked Bouslog to do something about the death sentence given to James Majors and John Palaliko in the Morgan's Corner murder. Bouslog took on the men's appeal, and convinced Governor Oren Long to stay the execution 15 minutes before it was scheduled to begin. Her appeal to the United States Court of Appeals for the Ninth Circuit was denied, but by then the grassroots activism started by the ILWU had reached Governor Samuel King, who commuted the sentence. Bouslog's work on the Majors-Palakilo encouraged Hawaii lawmakers to abolish the death penalty in 1957.

Bouslog represented Jack Wayne Hall and the six other members of the Hawaii seven after they were arrested in 1952 for violating the Smith Act. While representing them, she gave a speech at an ILWU meeting about the trial. This was reported to the judge, who put her in contempt of court while the Hawaii Bar Association investigated the matter. Her law license was suspended by the Territorial Supreme Court, but she appealed it all the way to the United States Supreme Court. The decision was reversed on June 29, 1959. Bouslog left the Bouslog and Symonds firm in 1978, but continued practicing on her own.

Bouslog was awarded the Allan F. Saunders Civil Liberties Award by the American Civil Liberties Union. In 1989, she was admitted as a fellow of Indiana University's Academy of Distinguished Alumni.

She died on April 18, 1998, at St. Francis Hospital in Honolulu.
