= Mary Coon Walters =

American judge (1922–2001)

- Born: Mary Coon; January 29, 1922; Baraga, Michigan
- Died: April 4, 2001 (aged 79)
- Military career
- Allegiance: United States
- Branch: Women Airforce Service Pilots
- Other work: first female New Mexico Supreme Court justice

Mary Coon Walters (January 29, 1922 – April 4, 2001) was the first female New Mexico Supreme Court justice, the first woman in New Mexico to be a district judge, and the first president of the New Mexico Women's Political Caucus.

== Early life and military career ==
Mary Coon Walters was born Mary Coon in Baraga, Michigan on January 29, 1922. In 1942, at the age of 20, she joined the Women Airforce Service Pilots. She was assigned to Hondo Army Air Field, flying a C-45 Expeditor as a transport pilot. Walters fought in the Korean War before leaving the military in 1955.

== Later life ==
As specified in the G.I. Bill, Walters gained entry into the University of New Mexico School of Law, and was admitted to the bar the same year that she graduated in 1962. Walters served as a delegate to the 1969 New Mexico Constitutional Convention. In 1972, Bruce King appointed Walters as the a Probate Judge in Albuquerque, New Mexico, making Walters the first woman in New Mexico to be a district judge. Walters became the first woman on the New Mexico Supreme Court when Toney Anaya appointed her to a term that began on December 13, 1984, and she was re-elected to a term that began on January 1, 1984. She was also the first president of the New Mexico Women's Political Caucus. She was in the first group of women inducted into the New Mexico Women's Hall of Fame in 1986.

== Death and legacy ==
Walters died on April 4, 2001. A historical marker recognizing her contributions was erected at the intersection of Tucker Avenue NE and Yale Boulevard NE, in Albuquerque, New Mexico. In 2007, the New Mexico Supreme Court made her an honorary Chief Justice of the New Mexico Supreme Court and ordered her portrait be displayed in the New Mexico Supreme Court Building inside the Hall of Chief Justices.

== See also ==
- List of first women lawyers and judges in New Mexico
