= List of first minority male lawyers and judges in New Mexico =

This is a list of the first minority male lawyer(s) and judge(s) in New Mexico. It includes the year in which the men were admitted to practice law (in parentheses). Also included are men who achieved other distinctions such becoming the first in their state to graduate from law school or become a political figure.

== Firsts in New Mexico's history ==
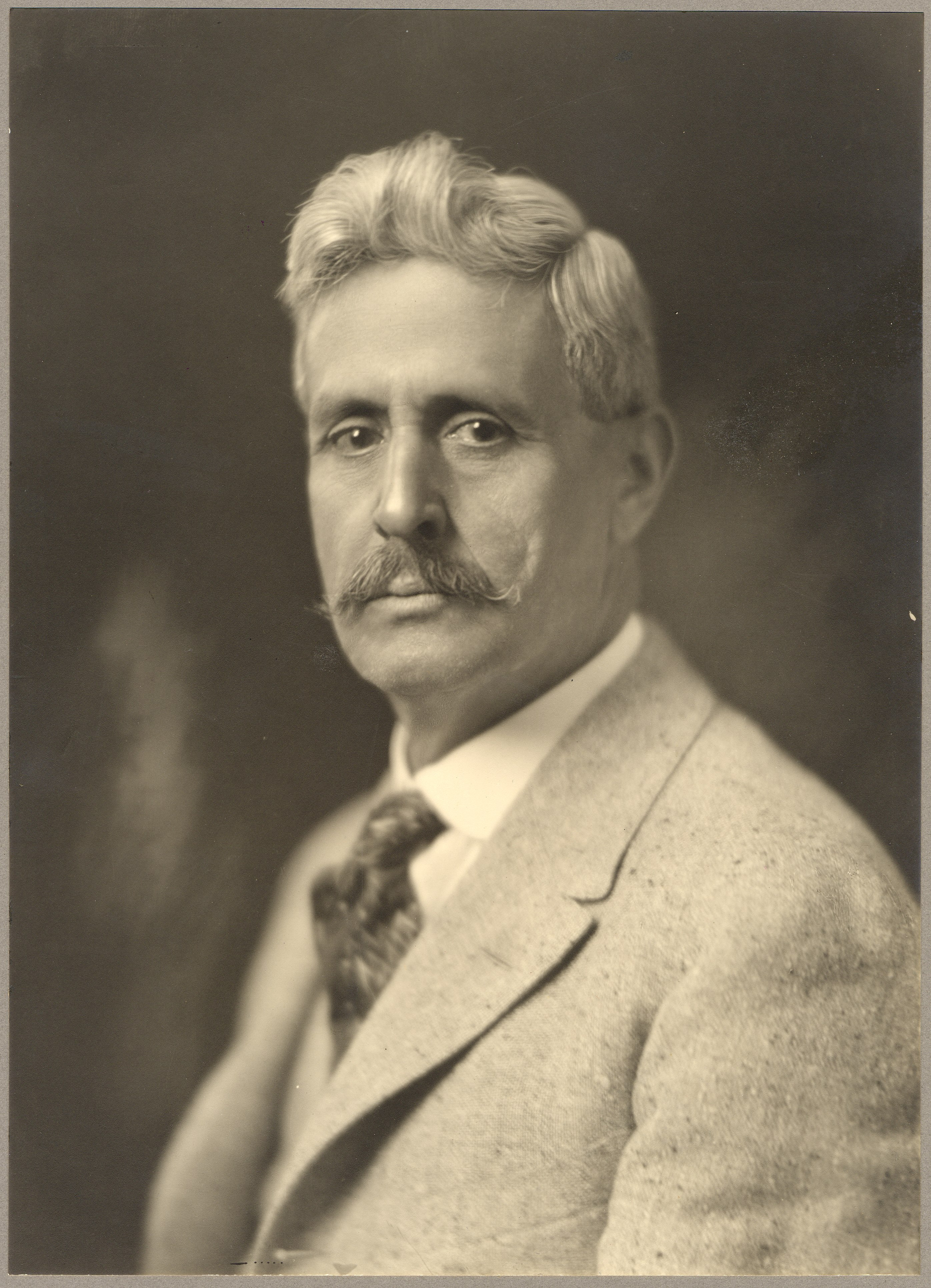
Octaviano A. Larrazolo: First Hispanic American male to serve as a U.S. Senator from New Mexico (1928)

=== Lawyers ===
- First African American male: Fred Simms (c. 1880s)
- First African American male to practice before the New Mexico Supreme Court: George W. Malone (1914)
- First Navajo male: Thomas Dodge (1924)
- First Mexican American males: Dennis Chávez (1920) and Antonio Barreiro (c. 1932) respectively
- First blind male: Albert T. Gonzales (1935)
- First African American male to pass the New Mexico State Bar: Reginald H. Alleyne, Jr. in 1965

=== State judges ===
- First Hispanic male (New Mexico Territorial Supreme Court): Antonio Jose Otero around 1846:
- First Hispanic male (Supreme Court of New Mexico): Eugene D. Lujan in 1945
- First Hispanic male (Chief Justice; Supreme Court of New Mexico): Eugene D. Lujan in 1951
- First African American male: Tommy Jewell (1979) in 1984
- First African American male (district court): Tommy Jewell (1979) in 1991

=== Federal judges ===
- First Hispanic American male (U.S. District Court for the District of New Mexico): Santiago E. Campos (1953) in 1978
- First Hispanic American male (Chief Judge; U.S. District Court for the District of New Mexico): Santiago E. Campos (1953) in 1987

=== Attorney General ===
- First Hispanic male (New Mexico Territory): Miguel Antonio Otero (1851) from 1854 to 1856
- First Hispanic male (Attorney General of New Mexico): Miguel A. Otero III from 1929 to 1930
- First Native American male (Cherokee Nation): Hal Stratton in 1986

=== District Attorney ===
- First African American male: Gerald Byers in 2020

=== Political office ===
- First Mexican American male (U.S. Senator): Octaviano Ambrosio Larrazolo (1888) in 1928
- First New Mexico-born Latino male (U.S. Senator): Dennis Chávez in 1935
- First openly gay male (New Mexico Legislature): Jacob Candelaria in 2013

=== State Bar of New Mexico ===
- First Hispanic American male president: Arturo Jaramillo in 1994
- First African American male commissioner: Ray Hamilton from 1994 to 1999

== Firsts in local history ==
- Robert Jones: First African American male lawyer in Albuquerque, Bernalillo County, New Mexico
- John EchoHawk: First Native American male (Pawnee) lawyer to graduate from the Indian law program at the University of New Mexico [Bernalillo County, New Mexico]
- Santiago Juarez: First Hispanic American male lawyer in Roswell [Chaves County, New Mexico]
- Gerald Byers: First African American male to serve as the District Attorney for the Third Judicial District (2020; Doña Ana County, New Mexico)

== See also ==
- List of first minority male lawyers and judges in the United States
- List of first women lawyers and judges in the United States
- List of first women lawyers and judges in New Mexico
