= Betty Ann Camunez =

American lawyer

Betty A. Camunez
- Born: Betty Ann Camunez; February 11, 1944 (age 81); San Diego, California, U.S.
- Education: University of Denver (JD)
- Occupation: Lawyer

Betty Ann Camunez (born February 11, 1944) is an American lawyer. She was the first Hispanic female lawyer in New Mexico.

She was born in San Diego, California. Not long after, she and her family relocated to Las Cruces, New Mexico. She received her Juris Doctor from University of Denver Sturm College of Law in 1970 and was admitted to the Colorado State Bar the same year. During her time at the college, she was a member of the Mexican-American Law Student Association (MALSA) and even participated in a program to provide free legal services for West Side residents. After a brief stint working as an attorney in San Diego, Camunez returned to New Mexico in 1972 and was admitted to the New Mexico State Bar. She then worked as an attorney for the Legal Aid Society of Albuquerque and the New Mexico Child Support Enforcement Division. She was appointed and served as a member of the New Mexico Child Support Guideline Commissions in 1994 and 1998.

== See also ==
- List of first women lawyers and judges in New Mexico
