= William Hayes Pope =

American judge

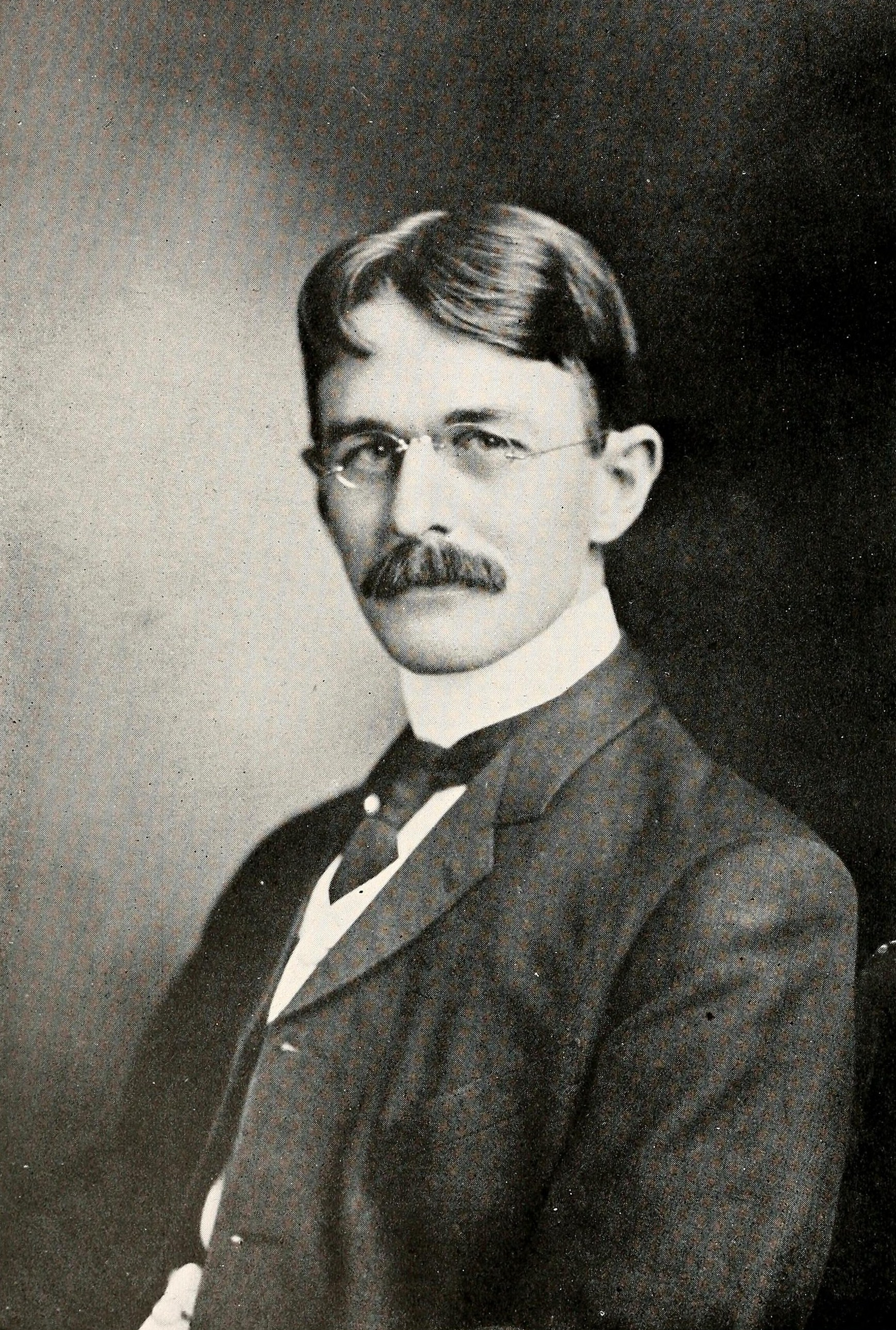
- Judge William H. Pope. Photograph from Representative New Mexicans, Vol. I (1912).

Judge of the United States District Court for the District of New Mexico
- In office February 20, 1912 – September 13, 1916
- Appointed by: William Howard Taft
- Preceded by: Seat established by 36 Stat. 557
- Succeeded by: Colin Neblett

Personal details
- Born: William Hayes Pope; June 14, 1870 Beaufort, South Carolina
- Died: September 13, 1916 (aged 46) Atlanta, Georgia
- Resting place: Fairview Cemetery; Santa Fe, New Mexico
- Education: University of Georgia (M.A.); University of Georgia School of Law (LL.B.)

William Hayes Pope (June 14, 1870 – September 13, 1916) was the last Chief Justice of New Mexico Territory and the first United States district judge of the United States District Court for the District of New Mexico after New Mexico attained statehood.

== Education and career ==
Pope was born in Beaufort, South Carolina to Joseph James Pope, a lawyer, and Emily Hayes (Mikell). He received a Master of Arts degree from the University of Georgia in 1889, followed by a Bachelor of Laws from the University of Georgia School of Law in 1890. He also taught at the University of Georgia as an adjunct professor of ancient languages from 1889 to 1890, when he was admitted to the bar. He then practiced law in Atlanta, Georgia., joining the law firm of his uncle, Hoke Smith.

Pope moved to Santa Fe, New Mexico Territory in 1894, apparently seeking a climate that was better for his health. He practiced law there until 1896 in the firm Victory & Pope, with senior partner John P. Victory. Their partnership was also a public one; Victory was then the territory's attorney general, and Pope served as the Assistant Attorney General from 1895 to 1897. During that period, he served as a commissioner from New Mexico to the Atlanta Exposition in 1895, and on the Capitol Rebuilding Commission from 1895 to 1900.

In March 1896, Pope was appointed by the United States Attorney General to serve as a special Assistant United States Attorney in the United States Court of Private Land Claims, from which Pope resigned in June 1902. He was then appointed by the United States Secretary of the Interior as a special United States Attorney to represent the interests of the Pueblo Indians of New Mexico Territory, from 1901 to 1902.

In June 1902, Governor-General of the Philippines William Howard Taft appointed Pope to a judgeship on the Court of First Instance, Philippine Islands. Pope established a friendship with Taft during his service there. He returned to the United States in July 1903, and in October was appointed by President Theodore Roosevelt as an associate justice of the New Mexico Territorial Supreme Court. Pope was elevated to Chief Justice in 1910, and served in that capacity until 1912.

== Federal judicial service ==
Pope was the first judge appointed to the new United States District Court for New Mexico, after it attained statehood on January 6, 1912. Pope was nominated by President William Howard Taft on January 22, 1912, to the United States District Court for the District of New Mexico, to a new seat authorized by 36 Stat. 557. His nomination received some opposition. Ten prominent New Mexico lawyers accused Pope of delaying decisions in submitted cases (despite his reputation to the contrary), and Pope's support of prohibition may have also been an issue. He was confirmed by the United States Senate on February 20, 1912, and received his commission the same day. His service terminated on September 13, 1916, due to his death in Atlanta.

=== Notable case ===
One of Pope's decisions on the federal bench was reversed by the U.S. Supreme Court, in United States v. Sandoval, 231 U.S. 28 (1913). The issue was whether an 1897 federal law that criminalized the sale of alcohol to Indians applied to the Pueblos in the state of New Mexico. Pope had ruled that the Pueblos were ordinary citizens living on private property, and did not fit into the classes of Indians defined in the 1897 law. In reversing, the Supreme Court held that the Pueblos were a dependent people, which Congress had made clear in the Enabling Act providing for New Mexico's statehood.

== Memberships and interment ==
Pope was a member of the Independent Order of Odd Fellows, the Elks, Shriners, and a freemason. He was married for eleven years, but had no children. He was buried in Fairview Cemetery in Santa Fe.

Legal offices
| Preceded by Seat established by 36 Stat. 557 | Judge of the United States District Court for the District of New Mexico; 1912–1916 | Succeeded by Colin Neblett |
