= Morton P. Fisher =

American judge (1897–1965)

Member of the United States Tax Court
- In office March 4, 1954 – February 11, 1965
- Preceded by: Eugene Black
- Succeeded by: Charles R. Simpson

Personal details
- Born: February 14, 1897 Baltimore, Maryland, U.S.
- Died: February 11, 1965 (aged 67) Baltimore, Maryland, U.S.
- Education: Johns Hopkins University (B.A.); University of Maryland (LL.B.)

Morton Poe Fisher (February 14, 1897 – February 11, 1965) was a judge of the United States Tax Court from 1954 until his death in 1965.

== Education, military service, and career ==
Born in Baltimore, Maryland, Fisher served in the United States Navy Reserve in World War I. He received an A.B. from Johns Hopkins University in 1919, and gained admission to the bar in Maryland that same year. He immediately entered the practice of law in Baltimore, and received an LL.B. from the University of Maryland in 1920, where he received an award for highest scholastic average and best legal thesis. He remained in civil practice until 1923, when he became an assistant U.S. attorney for the District of Maryland until 1925, returning to private practice in Baltimore until 1927. He was a special assistant to the Attorney General in the Tax Division of the United States Department of Justice from 1928 to 1930, and was again in private practice in Baltimore from 1931 to 1943.

In World War II, he served in the United States Army and achieved the rank of lieutenant colonel. He was awarded a Certificate of Merit, an Army Commendation Ribbon, and a Battle Star. After the war, he was a member of the Internal Revenue Service Excess Profits Tax Council from 1946 to 1947, after which he returned to private practice in Baltimore until 1954.

== Judicial service ==
In 1954, President Dwight D. Eisenhower nominated Fisher to a seat on the United States Tax Court. Fisher was confirmed by the United States Senate, and took his oath of office as judge on March 4, 1954. He was reappointed for succeeding term beginning June 2, 1956, set to expire June 1, 1968, but he died three years before the end of his term.

== Teaching and writing ==
In addition to his professional activities, Fisher was a lecturer at the University of Baltimore on Federal Taxation from 1941 to 1943 and from 1946 to 1953, and on Maryland Pleading from 1949 to 1953. During this time, he co-authored Fisher on Maryland Pleading (2d edition). He also held various positions with the American Bar Association and the Maryland State Bar Association.

== Personal life ==
Fisher married Adelaide Rose Block of Baltimore, with whom he had one daughter and one son.
