= Marybeth Yuen Maul =

American magistrate (1925–2010)

- Born: 26 March 1925
- Died: 23 April 2010
- Education: University of Wisconsin; Cornell Law School; University of Wisconsin Law School
- Occupations: Judge, lawyer

Marybeth Yuen Maul (March 26, 1925 – April 23, 2010) was the first Asian-American female magistrate in Hawaii. She also served as a Molokai District Court judge for the County of Maui. Maul died on April 23, 2010, in Eugene, Oregon, at 85 years old.

== Personal life ==
Maul was born in Honolulu on March 26, 1925, to Yun Kee Yuen and Lin Tai (Chock) Yuen. She had three siblings: Lilyan, Jane, and John ("Sonny"). Her father, Yun Kee Yuen worked for the Libby pineapple company as an office clerk and bookkeeper. Maul's family often spent summers in Moloka'i. Maul's parents sent her and her siblings to stay with David Beckwith, the cousin of a family friend, in Wisconsin during World War II in order to protect them. Marybeth would later return to Moloka'i to practice law and to help her father in the 1950s. Maul and her family started the first Chinese restaurant on Moloka'i called Hop Inn in 1963. She also cofounded the Molokai Humane Society, volunteered with the Girl Scouts, and served on the State Advisory Committee to the Department of Education on Title IV.

Maul raised her two daughters, Robin Campbell and Christy Wong, on Moloka'i. As of 2010, she had four grandchildren.

== Education ==
Maul first attended Punahou School as one of the few Asian students present. However, due to World War II and the attack on Pearl Harbor, Punahou's school campus was commandeered by the U.S. military and the students were transferred to the University of Hawaii High School. Maul's parents decided to send Marybeth, her brother, and one of her sisters to Wisconsin with a family friend's cousin in an attempt to keep them safe during the war.

In 1943, Marybeth graduated from the University of Wisconsin High School. She went on to attend the University of Wisconsin–Madison where she graduated in 1947 with a degree in political science. Maul attended Cornell Law School but later transferred and finished her law degree at the University of Wisconsin Law School in 1950.

Maul took the examination twice for the Hawaii State Bar Association. She failed by .02 points in 1950 but passed in 1952.

== Career ==
Maul was a law clerk for two years in Chicago from 1950 to 1952. In 1952, Maul started working in the Honolulu city attorney's office. She was one of the only practicing attorneys on the island for several years. Maul's clients were often plantation workers for the pineapple companies and she usually assisted them pro bono or at a lowered rate.

In 1957, Judge Stanley Ashford recommended Maul to serve as magistrate for the island of Moloka'i. She would serve as magistrate from 1957 to 1971.

From 1985 to 1992, Maul worked at the Department of Health settlement for former Hansen's disease patients at Kalaupapa as an administrator.

Maul retired in 1992.

== Awards ==
Maul was awarded the Keeper of the Flame Award in 1988 by the Hawaii Immigrant Justice Center for leadership and commitment to people of Hawaii.
