= Carol Jean Vigil =

American judge

New Mexico 1st Judicial District Judge
- In office June 1998 – 2005

Assistant Attorney General, serving under New Mexico Attorney General Jeff Bingaman

Personal details
- Born: October 24, 1947
- Died: March 27, 2009 (aged 61) Tesuque, New Mexico
- Resting place: Rosario Cemetery, Santa Fe, New Mexico
- Spouse: Philip Palmer
- Relations: Mother, Evelyn Vigil; brother, Martin Vigil.
- Children: Sparo Arika Vigil
- Education: Bachelor's degree and law degree, University of New Mexico
- Profession: Private law practice; lawyer for the Tesuque Pueblo; authored the original tribal codes for both the Taos Pueblos and the Tesuque Pueblos.

Carol Jean Vigil (October 24, 1947 – March 27, 2009) was an American judge based in the state of New Mexico. Vigil was the first Native American woman to be elected as a state district judge in the United States, and the first female Native American to be elected a state court judge in New Mexico. She was a member of the Pueblo people.

== Biography ==
=== Early life ===
Vigil received her bachelor's degree from the University of New Mexico. She also earned her law degree in 1977 from the University of New Mexico as well.

She became the first Pueblo woman to be admitted to the New Mexico state bar following her completion of law school. Vigil soon began working for the Indian Pueblo Legal Services Inc.

Vigil became Assistant Attorney General in the office of New Mexico Attorney General Jeff Bingaman. She entered into a private law practice beginning in the mid-1980s. She later served as a lawyer for the Tesuque Pueblo people. Vigil also authored the original tribal codes for both the Taos Pueblos and the Tesuque Pueblos.

Vigil was hired by the 1st Judicial District of New Mexico as a child support hearing officer beginning in 1988. She was further promoted as a special commissioner for domestic violence and mental competency in 1994. Vigil focused much of her legal work on getting parents to pay overdue child support. Vigil was so successful at her position that the sheriff of Santa Fe County once remarked to her that she put "more people in the Santa Fe County jail than the district attorney."

The Santa Fe New Mexican named Vigil one of the "10 Who Made a Difference" in its annual list in 1995.

=== State judge ===
Carol Jean Vigil was sworn in as a New Mexican 1st Judicial District state judge in June 1998. The 1st Judicial District includes all of Santa Fe, Rio Arriba and Los Alamos counties. In doing so, she became the first Native American female judge in New Mexico and the first Native American to be elected a judge of any general jurisdiction court in the United States. In a tribute to her heritage, Vigil was sworn into office while wearing a black judicial robe decorated with beaded Pueblo Indian symbols that included lightning, clouds, rain and mountains embroidered on her shoulders.

In one of her most notable rulings, Vigil upheld state court jurisdiction over tort claims for personal injury which had been filed by customers of Native American gambling enterprises. The Puebloes of New Mexico opposed her decision.

Bryant Rogers, a Santa Fe attorney who served as Judge Vigil's treasurer during her 1998 election campaign, later discussed his former boss saying, "She was very serious about her work, really concerned about getting it right...very thoughtful and well prepared."

Vigil retired as a district court judge in 2005, citing declining health. She suffered from diabetes and other ailments.

=== Death ===
Vigil died in her sleep in Tesuque, New Mexico, on March 27, 2009, at the age of 61. She was survived by her husband, Philip Palmer, whom she had been married to for 31 years; her daughter, Sparo Arika Vigil; her mother, Evelyn Vigil; and her brother, Martin Vigil.

== See also ==
- List of Native American jurists
- List of first women lawyers and judges in New Mexico
