= Santiago E. Campos =

American judge

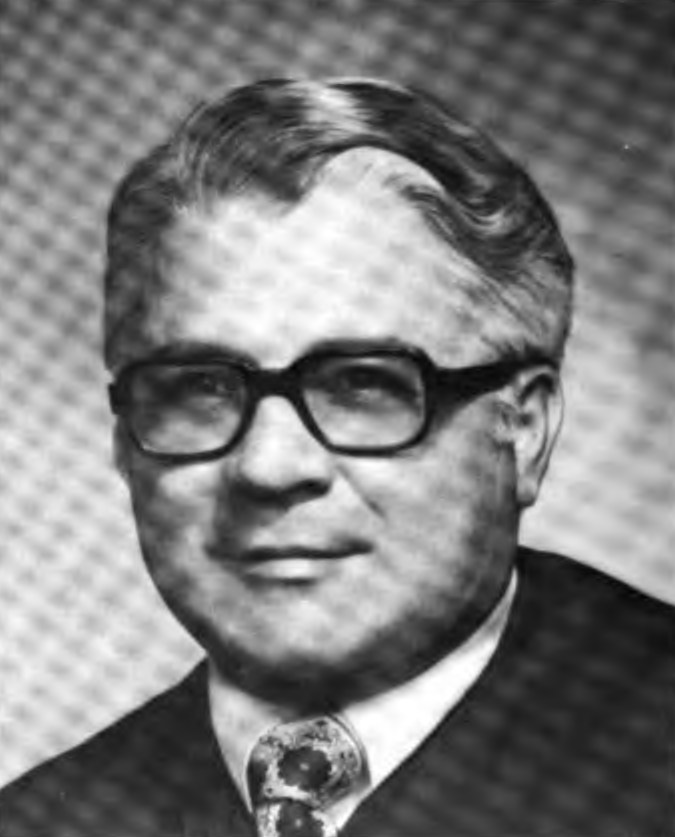

Senior Judge of the United States District Court for the District of New Mexico
- In office December 26, 1992 – January 20, 2001

Chief Judge of the United States District Court for the District of New Mexico
- In office 1987–1989
- Preceded by: Howard C. Bratton
- Succeeded by: Juan Guerrero Burciaga

Judge of the United States District Court for the District of New Mexico
- In office July 12, 1978 – December 26, 1992
- Appointed by: Jimmy Carter
- Preceded by: Harry Vearle Payne
- Succeeded by: Martha Vázquez

Personal details
- Born: Santiago Eloy Campos; December 25, 1926 Santa Rosa, New Mexico
- Died: January 20, 2001 (aged 74) Santa Fe, New Mexico
- Education: University of New Mexico School of Law (JD)

Santiago Eloy Campos (December 25, 1926 – January 20, 2001) was a United States district judge of the United States District Court for the District of New Mexico.

== Education and career ==
Born in Santa Rosa, New Mexico, Campos received a Juris Doctor from the University of New Mexico School of Law in 1953. He was a seaman in the United States Navy during World War II, from 1944 to 1946. He was an assistant and first assistant state attorney general of New Mexico from 1955 to 1957. He was in private practice in Santa Fe, New Mexico from 1957 to 1970, becoming a District judge of New Mexico's First Judicial District from 1971 to 1978.

== Federal judicial service ==
On June 2, 1978, Campos was nominated by President Jimmy Carter to a seat on the United States District Court for the District of New Mexico vacated by Judge Harry Vearle Payne. Campos was confirmed by the United States Senate on July 10, 1978, and received his commission on July 12, 1978. He served as Chief Judge from 1987 to 1989, assuming senior status on December 26, 1992, and serving in that capacity until his death of cancer, in Santa Fe. The Santiago E. Campos United States Courthouse was renamed in his honor in 2004.

== See also ==
- List of Hispanic and Latino American jurists
- List of first minority male lawyers and judges in New Mexico

== Sources ==
Legal offices
Preceded by Harry Vearle Payne	Judge of the United States District Court for the District of New Mexico; 1978–1992	Succeeded by Martha Vázquez
Preceded by Howard C. Bratton	Chief Judge of the United States District Court for the District of New Mexico; 1987–1989	Succeeded by Juan Guerrero Burciaga
