= Harry Vearle Payne =

American judge

Senior Judge of the United States District Court for the District of New Mexico
- In office April 6, 1978 – July 20, 1983

Chief Judge of the United States District Court for the District of New Mexico
- In office 1964–1978
- Preceded by: Waldo Henry Rogers
- Succeeded by: Howard C. Bratton

Judge of the United States District Court for the District of New Mexico
- In office March 27, 1963 – April 6, 1978
- Appointed by: John F. Kennedy
- Preceded by: Carl Hatch
- Succeeded by: Santiago E. Campos

Personal details
- Born: Harry Vearle Payne; September 6, 1908 Colonia Dublán, Mexico
- Died: July 20, 1983 (aged 74)
- Education: read law

Harry Vearle Payne (September 6, 1908 – July 20, 1983) was a United States district judge of the United States District Court for the District of New Mexico.

== Education and career ==
Born in Colonia Dublán, Mexico, to a family of 15 children, Payne fled with his family to the United States to escape revolutionaries who were marauding across northern Mexico from 1910 to 1914, settling in Virden, New Mexico. Due to poverty that required him to work to help support the family, he did not graduate high school until age 23. He spent one year at National University School of Law in Washington, D.C., working at a government job to pay his tuition. Payne then performed two years of missionary work for the Church Of Jesus Christ of Latter-Day Saints. Payne read law to enter the bar in 1934 and raised his family in the Lordsburg area of southwestern New Mexico, entering private practice in Lordsburg from 1934 to 1957, and serving as city attorney of Lordsburg from 1936 to 1955. He served many years in the New Mexico Legislature as a senator and state representative, and as Speaker of the House from 1945 to 1947. He was a District Judge of the Sixth Judicial District of New Mexico from 1957 to 1963.

== Federal judicial service ==
On February 18, 1963, at the recommendation of New Mexico United States Senator Clinton Presba Anderson, Payne was nominated by President John F. Kennedy to a seat on the United States District Court for the District of New Mexico vacated by Judge Carl Hatch. Payne was confirmed by the United States Senate on March 19, 1963, and received his commission on March 27, 1963. He served as Chief Judge from 1964 to 1978, assuming senior status on April 6, 1978, and serving in that capacity until his death on July 20, 1983.

== Sources ==
Legal offices
Preceded by Carl Hatch	Judge of the United States District Court for the District of New Mexico; 1963–1978	Succeeded by Santiago E. Campos
Preceded by Waldo Henry Rogers	Chief Judge of the United States District Court for the District of New Mexico; 1964–1978	Succeeded by Howard C. Bratton
