= Clarence W. Ashford =

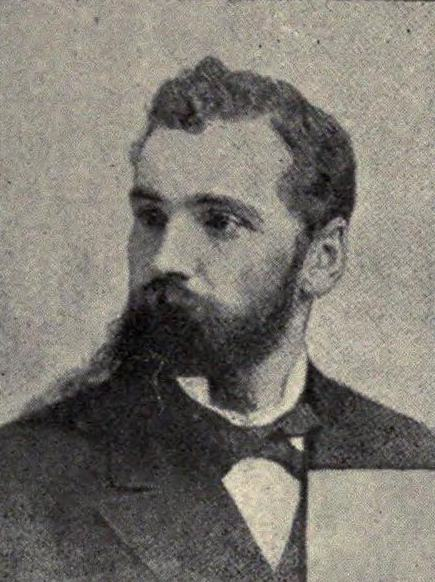

Judge of the First Circuit Court of Hawaii
- In office August 17, 1914 – April 8, 1919
- Succeeded by: Cornell Franklin

Hawaiian Kingdom Attorney General
- In office July 1, 1887 – June 14, 1890
- Monarch: Kalākaua
- Preceded by: Antone Rosa
- Succeeded by: Arthur P. Peterson

Personal details
- Born: February 24, 1857 Canada West
- Died: July 3, 1921 (aged 64) Honolulu, Hawaii
- Spouse: Jean (Jennie) Eleanor Robertson
- Children: Stanley; Huron; Marguerite

Clarence Wilder Ashford (February 24, 1857 – July 3, 1921) was the Attorney General of the Hawaiian Kingdom under Kalākaua from 1887 to 1890 and later appointed circuit court judge during the Territory of Hawaii from 1914 to 1919.

== Life ==
He was born in Canada West, and a cousin to Minister of the Interior Samuel Gardner Wilder. He and his brother Volney V. Ashford became involved with the Honolulu Rifles during the 1887 coup against King Kalākaua. He served in the cabinet of Kalākaua and later the House of Representative in the Hawaiian legislature of his successor Queen Liliuokalani from 1892 until the 1893 overthrow of the Hawaiian Kingdom. Both brothers were exiled to San Francisco after the 1895 counter-revolution to restore the monarchy. Clarence returned to Hawaii after its annexation by the United States.

President Woodrow Wilson appointed him First Judge of First Circuit Court, District of Hawaii in 1914, a position he held until his retirement.

Ashford married Jean (Jennie) Eleanor Robertson, with whom he had two sons, Stanley and Huron, and a daughter Marguerite Kamehaokalani Ashford. His daughter became the first woman to practice law in the Territory of Hawaii.

He died at his home in Honolulu in 1921, after a lingering illness following an operation.
