= Waldo Henry Rogers =

American judge

Chief Judge of the United States District Court for the District of New Mexico
- In office 1963–1964
- Preceded by: Carl Hatch
- Succeeded by: Harry Vearle Payne

Judge of the United States District Court for the District of New Mexico
- In office May 15, 1954 – January 12, 1964
- Appointed by: Dwight D. Eisenhower
- Preceded by: Seat established by 68 Stat. 8
- Succeeded by: Howard C. Bratton

Personal details
- Born: Waldo Henry Rogers; May 17, 1908 Las Vegas, New Mexico
- Died: January 12, 1964 (aged 55)
- Education: University of Colorado Boulder (A.B.); University of Colorado School of Law (LL.B.)

Waldo Henry Rogers (May 17, 1908 – January 12, 1964) was a United States district judge of the United States District Court for the District of New Mexico.

== Education and career ==
Born in Las Vegas, New Mexico, Rogers received an Artium Baccalaureus degree from the University of Colorado Boulder in 1930 and a Bachelor of Laws from the University of Colorado School of Law in 1931. He was in private practice in New Mexico from 1931 to 1947. He was an assistant district attorney of the Second Judicial District of New Mexico in 1932. He was a Captain in the United States Army during World War II, from 1942 to 1945. He was Albuquerque, New Mexico's city attorney from 1947 to 1951. He was a Judge of the Second District Court, Division 1 in New Mexico from 1951 to 1954.

== Federal judicial service ==
Rogers was nominated by President Dwight D. Eisenhower on May 3, 1954, to the United States District Court for the District of New Mexico, to a new seat authorized by 68 Stat. 8. He was confirmed by the United States Senate on May 13, 1954, and received his commission on May 15, 1954. He served as Chief Judge from 1963 to 1964. His service terminated on January 12, 1964, due to his death.

== Sources ==
Legal offices
| Preceded by Seat established by 68 Stat. 8 | Judge of the United States District Court for the District of New Mexico; 1954–1964 | Succeeded by Howard C. Bratton |
| Preceded by Carl Hatch | Chief Judge of the United States District Court for the District of New Mexico; 1963–1964 | Succeeded by Harry Vearle Payne |
