= Colin Neblett =

American judge

Senior Judge of the United States District Court for the District of New Mexico
- In office July 6, 1948 – May 7, 1950

Judge of the United States District Court for the District of New Mexico
- In office February 5, 1917 – July 6, 1948
- Appointed by: Woodrow Wilson
- Preceded by: William Hayes Pope
- Succeeded by: Carl Hatch

Personal details
- Born: Colin Neblett; July 6, 1875 Brunswick County, Virginia
- Died: May 7, 1950 (aged 74)
- Education: Washington and Lee University; School of Law (LL.B.)

Colin Neblett (July 6, 1875 – May 7, 1950) was a United States district judge of the United States District Court for the District of New Mexico.

== Education and career ==
Born in Brunswick County, Virginia, Neblett received a Bachelor of Laws from Washington and Lee University School of Law in 1897. He entered private practice in Silver City, New Mexico Territory (State of New Mexico from January 6, 1912) in 1898. He was a member of the New Mexico Territorial Legislature in 1905. He was a superintendent of schools for Grant County, New Mexico Territory from 1907 to 1911, and was a Judge of the Sixth Judicial District of New Mexico from 1912 to 1916.

== Federal judicial service ==
On January 29, 1917, Neblett was nominated by President Woodrow Wilson to a seat on the United States District Court for the District of New Mexico vacated by Judge William Hayes Pope. Neblett was confirmed by the United States Senate on February 5, 1917, and received his commission the same day. He assumed senior status on July 6, 1948, serving in that capacity until his death on May 7, 1950.

== See also ==
- List of United States federal judges by longevity of service

== Sources ==
Legal offices
Preceded by William Hayes Pope	Judge of the United States District Court for the District of New Mexico; 1917–1948	Succeeded by Carl Hatch
