= Horace W. Vaughan =

American judge and politician (1867–1922)

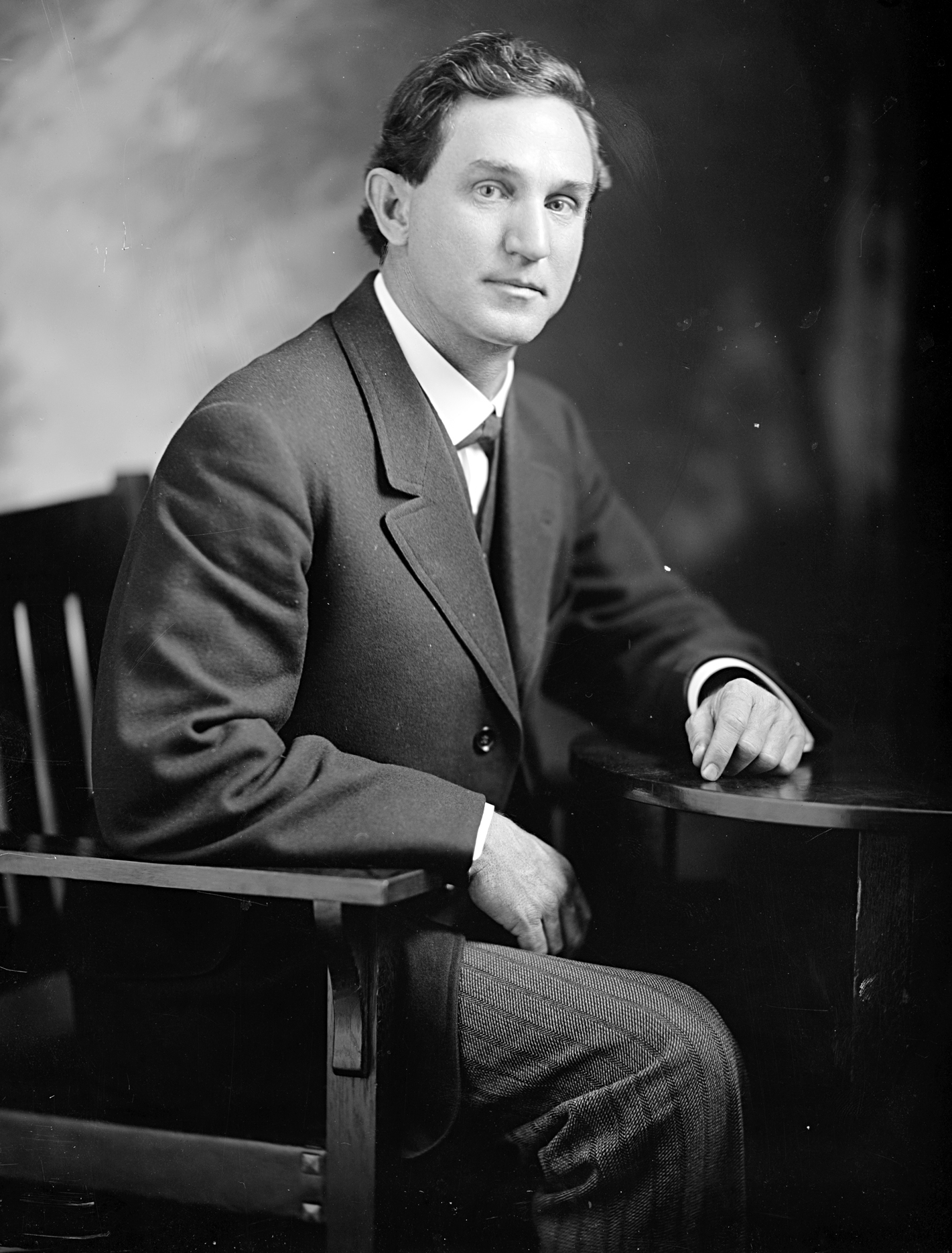
- Vaughan, 1905–1922

Judge of the United States District Court for the Territory of Hawaii
- In office May 15, 1916 – November 10, 1922
- Appointed by: Woodrow Wilson
- Preceded by: Sanford B. Dole
- Succeeded by: John T. DeBolt

Member of the U.S. House of Representatives from Texas's 1st district
- In office March 4, 1913 – March 3, 1915
- Preceded by: John Morris Sheppard
- Succeeded by: Eugene Black

Member of the Texas Senate from the 1st district
- In office January 14, 1911 – April 1, 1913
- Preceded by: James M. Terrell
- Succeeded by: Absolom C. Oliver

Personal details
- Born: Horace Worth Vaughan; December 2, 1867 Marion County, Texas, U.S.
- Died: November 10, 1922 (aged 54) Honolulu, Territory of Hawaii, U.S.
- Resting place: Oahu Cemetery
- Party: Democratic
- Spouse: Pearl Lockett (m. 1888)
- Children: Robert; Aileen; Jean Vaughan Gilbert

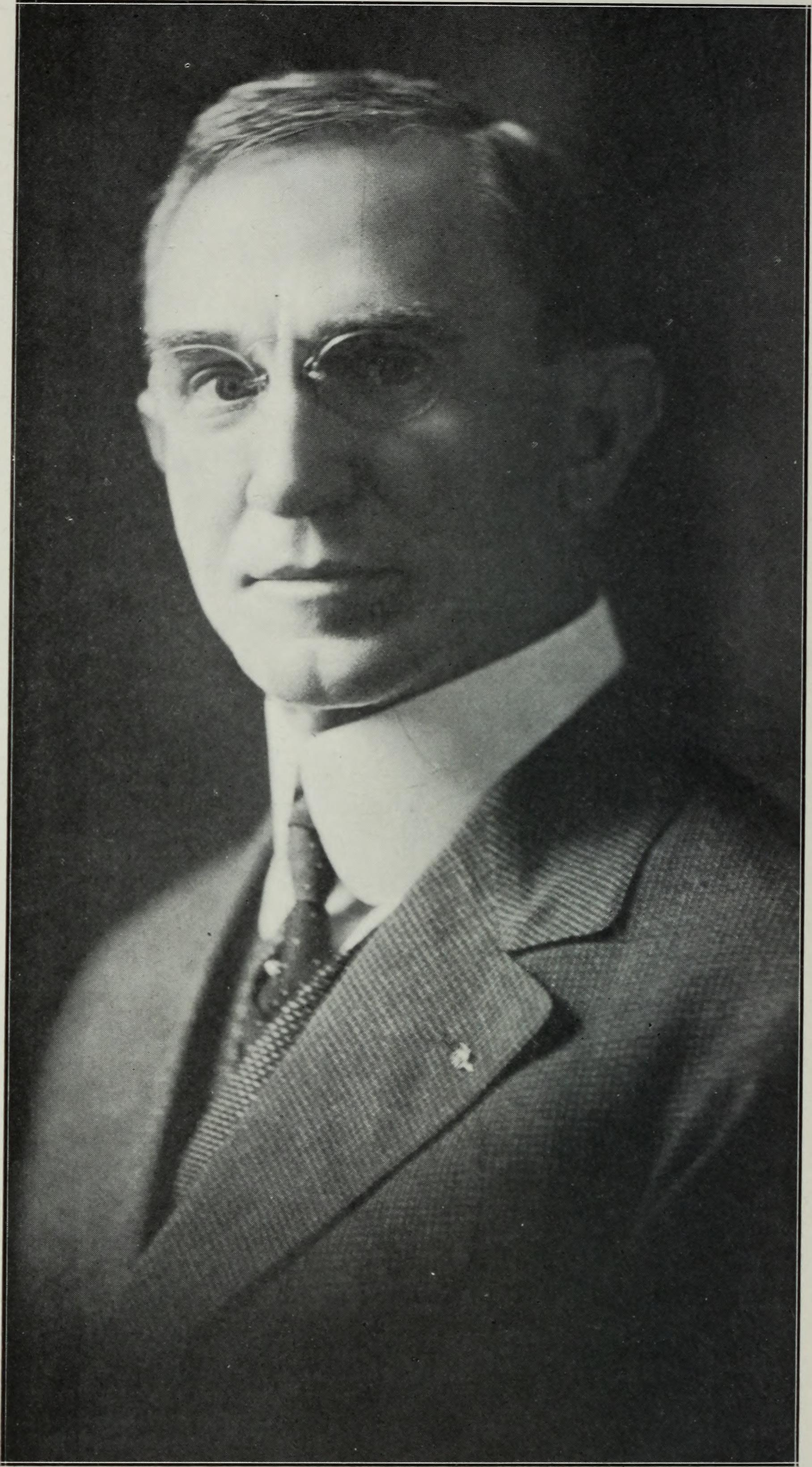
Vaughan, c. 1917

Horace Worth Vaughan (December 2, 1867 – November 10, 1922) was an American lawyer, jurist, and politician. He represented Texas in the United States House of Representatives and the Texas Senate. In 1916, he was appointed as a judge of the United States District Court for the Territory of Hawaii, where he lived the rest of his life.

== Early life ==
Vaughan was born to attorney George T. Vaughan and his wife Tippah Leary Vaughan, on December 2, 1867, in Marion County, Texas. He was of English ancestry, descended from early Jamestown, Virginia, settler John Vaughn. He married Pearl Lockett in 1888. They were the parents of Aileen, Robert Louis and Jean.

He was mostly self-taught, by reading his father's books. He was admitted to the bar in 1885, and began an active practice the next year.

== Legislative career ==
Vaughan was opposed to a national Prohibition on the manufacture, transportation, sale, possession, and consumption of alcoholic beverages. He was an advocate of states rights and believed in each state implementing its own policy.

=== Texas ===
From 1890 to 1898, he was city attorney for Texarkana, Texas. From 1911 until 1912, he was a member of the Texas State Senate. In 1912, he was elected to the United States House of Representatives to fill the vacancy of Morris Sheppard, who in turn had been elected to the United States Senate. Due to Vaughan's personal conviction that prohibition should be decided at the state level, he was defeated in his 1914 bid for re-election by Eugene Black, who made Vaughn's prohibition stance a campaign issue.

=== Hawaii ===
He was relocated to Honolulu in the Territory of Hawaii on October 1, 1915, when he was appointed assistant United States district attorney. On December 22, following the retirement of district attorney Sanford B. Dole, Vaughan was appointed to that position. Vaughan was a political supporter of President Woodrow Wilson, who subsequently appointed him judge of the territorial United States District Court for the District of Hawaii on May 15, 1916.

== Personal life and death ==
Vaughan married Pearl Lockett on November 21, 1888. The couple had three children.

Their only son US Navy Lt. Robert Louis Vaughan (1892–1920) died in a plane crash related to his military service. Believed to be despondent over the death of his son, Horace Vaughan was found on November 10, 1922, in his Honolulu home with a bullet wound to his neck and a gun by his side, an apparent suicide. He was buried in Oahu Cemetery. Pearl Vaughan died in 1960.

Oldest daughter Aileen V. Eppler (1890–1976) was the wife of Texas financial consultant William E. Eppler. At some point, the Eppler family moved to New Jersey where Aileen died at age 85.

Youngest daughter Jean Vaughan Gilbert (1904–1975) was one of the first women lawyers in Hawaii, and became city attorney of Honolulu. She died in 1975 in Honolulu.

== Fraternal memberships ==
- Freemasons
- Odd Fellows
- Woodmen of the World

U.S. House of Representatives
Preceded by John Morris Sheppard	Member of the U.S. House of Representatives from Texas's 1st congressional district 1913–1915	Succeeded by Eugene Black
Legal offices
Preceded by Sanford B. Dole	United States District Court Judge; 1916–1922	Succeeded by John T. DeBolt
