= List of first women lawyers and judges in New Mexico =

This is a list of the first women lawyer(s) and judge(s) in New Mexico. It includes the year in which the women were admitted to practice law (in parentheses). Also included are women who achieved other distinctions such becoming the first in their state to graduate from law school or become a political figure.

== Firsts in New Mexico's history ==
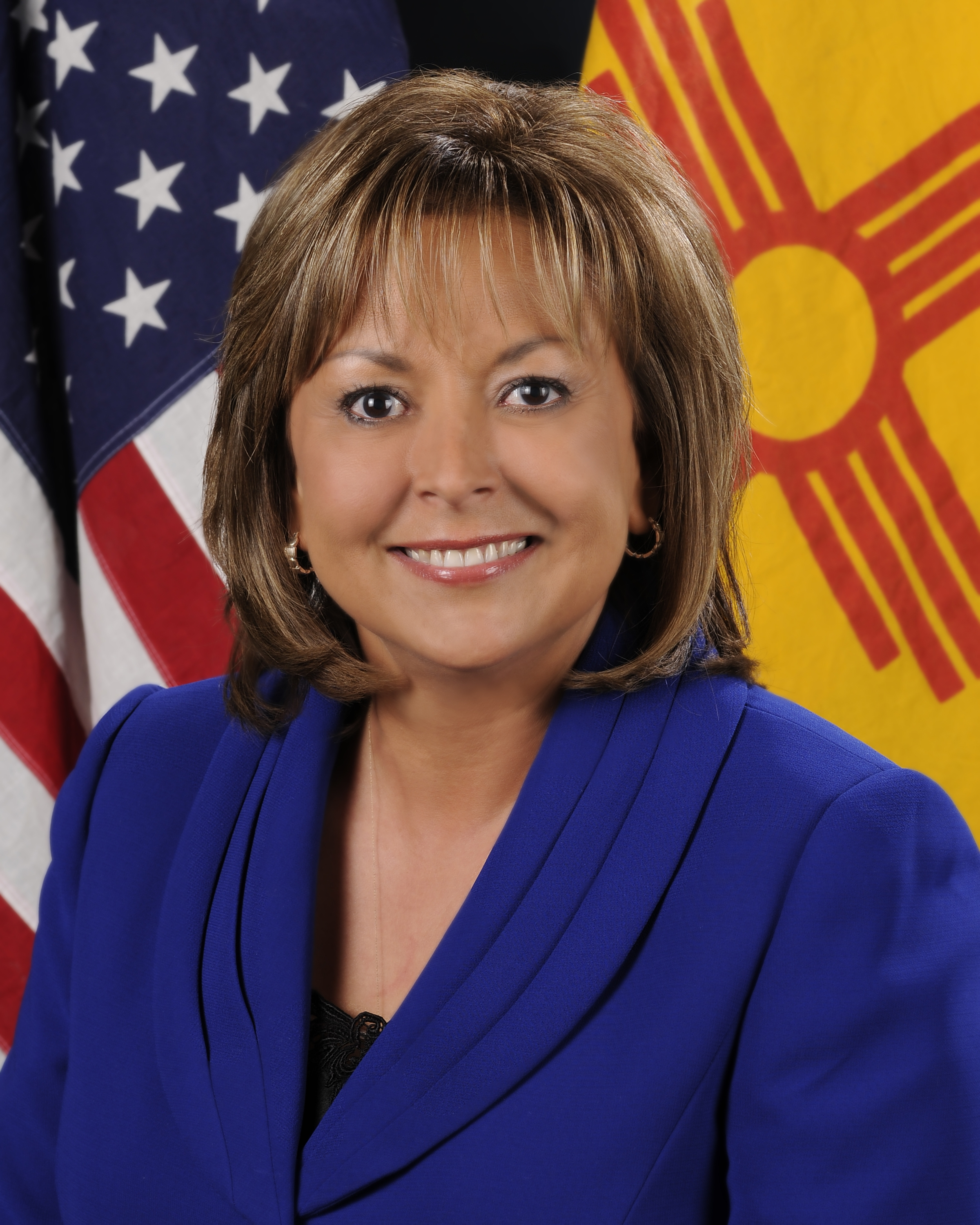
Susana Martinez: First Hispanic American female Governor of New Mexico (2011)

=== Lawyers ===
- First female admitted: Henrietta Hume Pettijohn Buck (1892)
- First female (actively practice): Nellie C. Brewer Pierce (1908)
- First Hispanic American female: Betty Ann Camunez (1972)
- First Navajo (female): Claudeen Arthur (1974)
- First Pueblo female: Carol Jean Vigil (c. 1977)
- First undocumented female: Jazmín Irazoqui-Ruiz in 2017

=== State judges ===
- First female: Olga Melinda Victoria Miller in 1910
- First female (district court): Mary Coon Walters (1962) in 1972
- First female (New Mexico Court of Appeals): Mary Coon Walters in 1978
- First Mexican American female (Second Judicial District): Patricia A. Madrid (1973) in 1978
- First female (Chief Judge; New Mexico Court of Appeals): Mary Coon Walters in 1982
- First female (New Mexico Supreme Court): Mary Coon Walters (1962) in 1984
- First Latino American female (New Mexico Court of Appeals): Christina Armijo (1975) from 1996-2011
- First Native American (Pueblo) (female): Carol Jean Vigil (c. 1977) in 1998
- First African American female (district court): Angela Jewell in 1999
- First female (Chief Justice; New Mexico Supreme Court): Pamela B. Minzner (1972) in 1999
- First Hispanic American female (Chief Justice; New Mexico Supreme Court): Petra F. Jimenez Maes (1973) in 2003
- First openly lesbian female (New Mexico Court of Appeals): Linda Vanzi in 2010
- First female (Seventh Judicial District): Mercedes C. Murphy in 2014
- First female (Sixth Judicial District): Jennifer Delaney
- First African American (female) (New Mexico Court of Appeals): Shammara Henderson in 2020
- First openly lesbian (Chief Justice; New Mexico Supreme Court): C. Shannon Bacon in 2022

=== Federal judges ===
- First female (Navajo Nation Judicial Branch): Marie Roanhorse Neswood from 1976–1989
- First (Latino American) female (U.S. District Court for the District of New Mexico): Martha Vázquez (1978) in 1993

=== Attorney General of New Mexico ===
- First Mexican American female: Patricia A. Madrid (1973) in 1999

=== Assistant Attorney General of New Mexico ===
- First female: Shirley Crabb Zabel in 1961

=== United States Attorney ===
- First female (Acting): Ruth Cooper Streeter in 1969

=== District Attorney ===
- First female: Margaret Weldon Lamb (1969) from 1978-1980

=== Political Office ===
- First Hispanic American female (Governor of New Mexico): Susana Martinez (1986) in 2011
- First Hispanic American female (elected from the Democratic Party as the Governor of New Mexico): Michelle Lujan Grisham (1987) in 2018

=== State Bar of New Mexico ===
- First African American female admitted: Barbara Brown Simmons (c. 1974)
- First female president: Amanda L. Ashford in 1990
- First Latino American female president: Mary Torres in 2002
- First African American (female) president: Aja N. Brooks in 2025

== Firsts in local history ==
- Barbara Brown Simmons (c. 1974): First African American female graduate from the University of New Mexico School of Law [Bernalillo County, New Mexico]
- Kari Brandenburg: First female District Attorney for Bernalillo County, New Mexico (2000)
- Kea Riggs: First female district court judge in Chaves County, New Mexico
- Esther Smith Van Soelen: First female lawyer in Clovis, New Mexico [Curry County, New Mexico]
- Olga Melinda Victoria Miller: First female judge in Doña Ana County, New Mexico (1910)
- Nancy Beard: First female Magistrate Judge in Eddy County, New Mexico
- Edith Gutierrez: First female (non-attorney) judge in Silver City, New Mexico [Grant County, New Mexico]
- Bettye Dean: First female magistrate in Lincoln County, New Mexico (1983)
- Angela "Spence" Pacheco: First female to serve as the judicial district attorney in Los Alamos, Rio Arriba, and Santa Fe Counties, New Mexico (2008)
- Brenna Clani-Washinawatok: First Native American (female) appointed as Judge of the Eleventh Judicial District of New Mexico (2025) [McKinley and San Juan Counties, New Mexico]
- Irene Saiz Mirabal-Counts: First female to serve as a Magistrate Judge in Otero County, New Mexico (2016)

== See also ==
- List of first women lawyers and judges in the United States
- Timeline of women lawyers in the United States
- Women in law

== Other topics of interest ==
- List of first minority male lawyers and judges in the United States
- List of first minority male lawyers and judges in New Mexico
