= Cora Agnes Benneson =

American attorney (1851–1919)

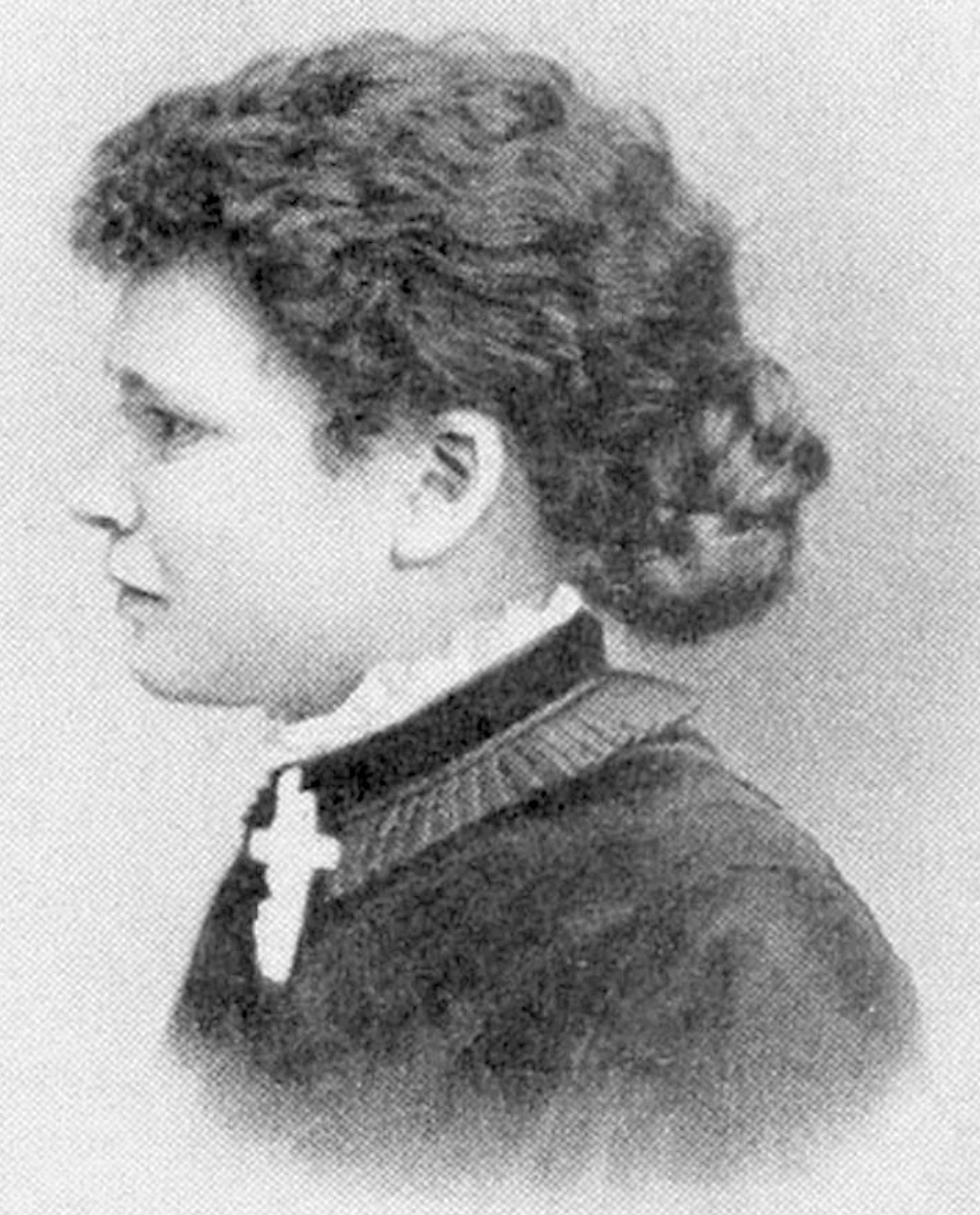
- Benneson, from Sketches of Women of New England (1904)
- Born: June 10, 1851; Quincy, Illinois, U.S.
- Died: June 8, 1919 (aged 67); Boston, Massachusetts, U.S.
- Resting place: Mount Auburn Cemetery, Massachusetts, U.S.
- Education: University of Michigan (BA, LLB, MA)
- Occupations: Attorney; lecturer; writer
- Years active: 1883–1919

Cora Agnes Benneson (June 10, 1851 – June 8, 1919) was an American attorney, lecturer, and writer. She was one of the first women to practice law in New England. Benneson was raised in Quincy, Illinois, to parents involved in local politics, religious organizing, and philanthropy; her parents regularly invited prominent guests to their home, including the writers and philosophers Amos Bronson Alcott and Ralph Waldo Emerson. Benneson began her university studies in 1875 at the University of Michigan, where she earned a Bachelor of Arts in 1878, a Bachelor of Laws in 1880, and a Master of Arts in 1883. After earning her master's degree, she was admitted to the bars of Illinois and Michigan.

From 1883 to 1885, Benneson traveled the world to learn about legal cultures, and in particular how they affected women, while sometimes taking what one scholar has called nativist or stereotypical views of those cultures. When she returned to the United States, Benneson undertook a nationwide lecture tour to speak about her travels and observations. In 1886, she briefly worked as an editor of West Publishing's law reports before taking up a history fellowship at Bryn Mawr College under then-professor Woodrow Wilson.

In 1888, Benneson moved to Boston, where she opened a law practice and continued to write and lecture. She was licensed to practice law in Massachusetts in 1894 and was appointed a special commissioner to the Council Chamber by the Massachusetts Governor Frederic T. Greenhalge in 1895. A member of various organizations, Benneson was made a fellow of the American Association for the Advancement of Science in 1899 and elected secretary of its Social and Economic Science Section in 1900. She turned her attention to opening a school for the "Americanization of Foreigners" in 1918. She died in Boston on June 8, 1919, at the age of 67, the day before her diploma to open the school arrived.

== Early life ==
Cora Agnes Benneson was born on June 10, 1851, in Quincy, Illinois, to Electa Ann (née Park) and Robert Smith Benneson. Robert was born in Newark, Delaware to the Rev. Thomas Benneson; he moved to Philadelphia and then Quincy, where he became a successful local businessman and a politician. He served as an alderman, mayor during the Civil War (during which time he prevented the city from going insolvent by paying its debts from his own pocket), and president of the city's board of education for 14 years. Electa, who descended from Richard Park—one of the original proprietors of Cambridge, Massachusetts in 1635—was an educator and philanthropist. Electa and Robert were both religious and helped to establish the Unitarian Church in Illinois.

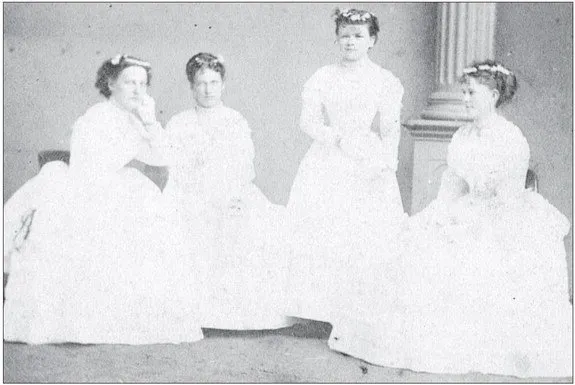
Benneson, at the far right, with the Quincy Female Seminary class of 1869

According to her biographer, the mathematician and sociologist Mary Esther Trueblood, Benneson was raised in "a large mansion situated above a series of terraces, surrounded by trees and shrubs, and commanding a magnificent view of fourteen miles of the Mississippi". The youngest of four sisters (and a cousin whom her parents raised), Benneson "was a sturdy child, orderly, accurate, self-reliant, ambitious, and persevering". By the age of 8, Benneson was writing and editing a magazine with her sisters and cousin called The Experiment. She was proficient in reading Latin at 12 and "[able] to get at the pith of an argument" and hold her own in conversation.

During her adolescence, Benneson's parents entertained famous personages at their home, including the writers and philosophers Amos Bronson Alcott and Ralph Waldo Emerson; the latter inspired Benneson's further study of philosophy and law. Benneson completed the equivalent of high school studies at the Quincy Academy at 15. That same year, she joined the Friends in Council, a reading group in philosophy composed of prominent Quincy women. When she was 18 years old, Benneson graduated as the valedictorian of the Quincy Female Seminary. She then taught English and composition at the school from 1869 to 1872.

== Higher education ==
In 1875, Benneson began her studies at the University of Michigan (then called Michigan University) in Ann Arbor, which had only begun accepting women as students in 1870. As an undergraduate student, Benneson was part of a community of women who would go on to have successful careers, including her friend Alice Freeman Palmer. She was a successful public speaker—defending, in her first year, the proposition that Homer was the author of the Iliad—and served as the first female editor on the editorial board of The Chronicle, which was at the time the university's leading newspaper. Benneson completed her degree in three years, graduating with a Bachelor of Arts in 1878.

Upon graduation, Benneson applied to Harvard Law School with the written recommendations of five alumni. Harvard rejected her application, asserting that "the equipments were too limited to make suitable provision for receiving women". (Note: Harvard Law School did not begin accepting women as students until 1950.) In 1880, she returned to her alma mater to study at its law school, where she was one of two women in her class. While there, Benneson studied under the Michigan Supreme Court Justices Thomas M. Cooley and James V. Campbell. She was elected class secretary and was an officer of the debate society; she also served as a judge for the Illinois Moot Court. She obtained her Bachelor of Laws in 1880 and a Master of Arts in 1883. After earning her master's degree, she was admitted to the bars of Illinois and Michigan.

== World travels ==
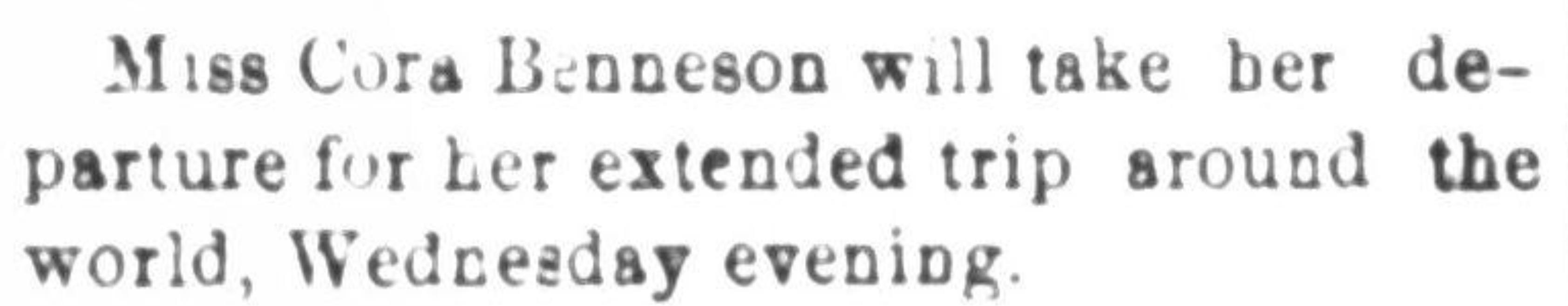
Announcement of Benneson's world tour, in the Daily Quincy Herald, June 10, 1883, p. 3

In 1883, Benneson—who was interested in foreign legal cultures and the status of women—began a two-year and four-month world tour, alongside an unknown young woman from Massachusetts. From San Francisco, "she traveled continually westward, visiting Hawaii, Japan, China, Burma, India, Arabia, Abyssinia, Egypt, Palestine, Turkey, and all of the principal countries of Europe". According to Trueblood, Benneson's tour was "an extended study of the customs, manners, and laws of many nations", and "doors", "both ... to the home and to the heart", "opened easily" to her. In seeking to observe foreign legal cultures, Benneson visited the courts and "governing assemblies" of "the principal civilized countries". Benneson's journey also brought "thrilling incidents", including:

a camping expedition in the Yosemite; horseback rides over the lava tracts to the Burning Lakes and down and up the steep walls of the gulches of Hawaii; the tour of Canton under English escort at the time of the Tonquin War; the elephant and dromedary rides in India and Egypt; the sight of the famous Highland regiment, the Black Watch, marching out to battle, and the sound of the artillery fire of the British squares; a journey with pilgrims returning after Easter from Jerusalem to Damascus; an adventure with brigands in Greece; the coming unawares upon the breathing Hermes of Praxiteles just unearthed; the mountain climbing in Switzerland; the exploration of the Norwegian fjords.

Benneson described her travels in letters, notes, and diary entries, which were published in 1890 in The Unitarian magazine as part of a series called "Palestine To-day". The historian James Ross-Nazzal stated that Benneson's descriptions of people of different races reflected her nativist beliefs. For example, Benneson, writing about her arrival in Greece, stated "how happy she was to leave 'the half-civilized races behind and enter Europe'". Like other contemporary women who traveled to Palestine, Benneson also "forwarded racist or stereotypical views of Bedouins", despite having and writing about positive experiences with individual Bedouins. She "treated Palestine's Catholic and Muslim-Arab populations as if they were a monolithic entity", and "she saw Biblical personalities" when interacting with individual Arab people.

== Career ==
After returning from her world tour in 1885, Benneson undertook a series of lectures on her travels in cities across the United States. Starting in Quincy, where she gave 17 talks, Trueblood wrote that "[h]er lectures, everywhere well attended, were found instructive by those who had traveled as well as by those who had not, for with her trained mind and keen perception she was able to give an interpretation as well as a narration of facts." Benneson also briefly worked as an editor of West Publishing's law reports in 1886. She moved to Bryn Mawr College in 1887 for a history fellowship under then-professor Woodrow Wilson, who described her as "a pleasant small person of mind which it will be very hard, but I trust not impossible, to impress".

In 1888, Benneson moved to Boston, living in a house surrounded by "historic and literary associations, ... midway between the Washington Elm and the Longfellow house, within a stone's throw of Radcliffe College and in sight of Harvard". Benneson opened her own legal practice—one of the first women in New England to do so—and she was admitted to the Massachusetts bar in 1894. In 1895 she was appointed as a special commissioner to the Council Chamber by the Massachusetts Governor Frederic T. Greenhalge. From 1897 to 1902, Benneson studied at Radcliffe College, receiving her second master's degree. Benneson's appointment as a special commissioner was renewed in 1905 and she held the position until her death.

In Boston, Benneson became friends with the abolitionist and suffragist Lucy Stone. Although not a self-proclaimed suffragist, Benneson frequented gatherings at Stone's home. She was a founder of the Unity Clubs of Ann Arbor and Quincy, a member of the College Club, and incorporating counsel for the Woman's Club House Corporation of Boston. In 1899, she was elected a fellow of the American Association for the Advancement of Science. She was elected secretary of the Association's Social and Economic Science Section in 1900. Benneson was also a member of the League for Progressive Democracy, and the Authors' League of America; she was made an honorary member of the Illinois State Historical Society.

Benneson lectured and published throughout her life, writing papers and delivering talks on constitutional law, education, government, and culture. Benneson focused in particular on women's issues. According to Ross-Nazzal, who called her a first-wave feminist, she believed that women should strive to better humanity through volunteerism, but that women should continue to raise children in the home as moral educators. Ross-Nazzal has stated that although Benneson was a reformer, she believed that reform must come through individual betterment, rather than social imposition.

== Final year and death ==
Benneson closed her law practice in 1918 and devoted herself to opening a school for the "Americanization of Foreigners". She died in Boston on June 8, 1919, at the age of 67, the day before authorization to operate the school arrived. According to her obituary writer, her death was reportedly caused by overworking. Benneson never married and had no children, and she was buried in Mount Auburn Cemetery.

== See also ==
- Almeda Eliza Hitchcock – first female attorney in the Hawaiian Kingdom whom Benneson persuaded to pursue law
- List of first women lawyers and judges in the United States
- Women in law

== Sources ==
=== Books and encyclopedias ===
- Bohan, Chara Haeussler (2004). Go to the Sources: Lucy Maynard Salmon and the Teaching of History. History of Schools and Schooling. New York: Peter Lang. ISBN 978-0-8204-5504-4.
- Drachman, Virginia G. (1998). Sisters in Law: Women Lawyers in Modern American History. Cambridge, Massachusetts: Harvard University Press. ISBN 978-0-674-80991-8.
- "Benneson, Cora Agnes". The National Cyclopedia of American Biography. Vol. 17. New York: James T. White & Company. 1920. pp. 398–399 – via the Internet Archive.
- Ross-Nazzal, James (2011). "The Women of Palestine in American Women's Travel Writing". In Adam, Thomas; Roemer, Nils H. (eds.). Crossing the Atlantic: Travel and Travel Writing in Modern Times. The Walter Prescott Webb Memorial Lectures. Vol. 42. College Station, Texas: Texas A&M University Press. pp. 210–247. ISBN 978-1-60344-292-3.
- Trueblood, Mary Esther (1904). "Cora Agnes Benneson". In Howe, Julia Ward (ed.). Representative Women of New England. New England Library of Popular Biographies. Boston: New England Historical Publishing Company. pp. 326–330 – via HathiTrust.

=== Journal articles ===
- Anderson, Paul Russell (1941). "Quincy, an Outpost of Philosophy". Journal of the Illinois State Historical Society. 34 (1): 50–83. JSTOR 40187976.
- Jordan, Gwen (2019). "'A Woman of Strange, Unfathomable Presence': Ida Platt's Lived Experience of Race, Gender, and Law 1863–1939" (PDF). Essay. Harvard Journal of Law & Gender. 42: 219–256. Archived from the original (PDF) on January 24, 2024.
- "Cora Agnes Benneson (1851–1919)". Journal of the Illinois State Historical Society. 12 (2): 307–309. 1919. JSTOR 40194568.
- Nazzal, James A. (2000). "'Verite Sans Peur': Cora Agnes Benneson, a First-Wave Feminist of Illinois". Journal of the Illinois State Historical Society. 93 (3): 273–286. JSTOR 40193344.
- Robinson, Lelia J. (1890). Fuller, Horace W. (ed.). "Women Lawyers in the United States" (PDF). The Green Bag. Vol. 2. pp. 10–32. Archived (PDF) from the original on January 22, 2024.
- Ross-Nazzal, Jim (2003). "Writing Their Own Way: American Women, Palestine's Bedouins and Issues of Safety in the Nineteenth Century" (PDF). Al-Raida. 20 (101–102): 51–56. Archived (PDF) from the original on January 27, 2024.

=== Newspaper articles ===
- "Brilliant Woman Dies: Miss Cora Benneson Was Native of Quincy". The Quincy Daily Herald (evening ed.). June 12, 1919. p. 5 – via the Quincy Public Library Digital Archives.
- "Quincy Female Seminary: Commencement Exercises". The Quincy Whig. Vol. 32, no. 13. June 26, 1869. p. 4 – via NewspaperArchive.
