= Carl Hatch =

United States Senator and judge

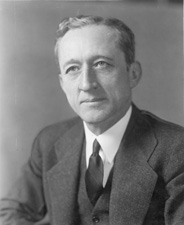

Senior Judge of the United States District Court for the District of New Mexico
- In office April 5, 1963 – September 15, 1963

Chief Judge of the United States District Court for the District of New Mexico
- In office 1954–1963
- Preceded by: Office established
- Succeeded by: Waldo Henry Rogers

Judge of the United States District Court for the District of New Mexico
- In office January 21, 1949 – April 5, 1963
- Appointed by: Harry S. Truman
- Preceded by: Colin Neblett
- Succeeded by: Harry Vearle Payne

United States Senator from New Mexico
- In office October 10, 1933 – January 3, 1949
- Preceded by: Sam G. Bratton
- Succeeded by: Clinton Presba Anderson

Personal details
- Born: Carl Atwood Hatch; November 27, 1889 Kirwin, Kansas, U.S.
- Died: September 15, 1963 (aged 73) Albuquerque, New Mexico, U.S.
- Resting place: Fairview Park Cemetery
- Party: Democratic
- Spouse: Winifred Ruth Caviness
- Education: Cumberland School of Law (LL.B.)

Carl Atwood Hatch (November 27, 1889 – September 15, 1963) was a United States senator from New Mexico and later was a United States district judge of the United States District Court for the District of New Mexico.

== Early life, education, and career ==
Hatch was born on November 27, 1889, in Kirwin, Phillips County, Kansas, the son of Esther Shannon (Ryan) and Harley Atwood Hatch. Hatch attended the public schools of Kansas and Oklahoma and then received a Bachelor of Laws in 1912 from the Cumberland School of Law (then part of Cumberland University, now part of Samford University) and was admitted to the bar the same year. He entered private practice in El Dorado, Oklahoma from 1912 to 1916. He was in private practice in Clovis, New Mexico in 1916 and from 1929 to 1933. He was an assistant attorney general for the State of New Mexico from 1917 to 1918. He was the Collector of Internal Revenue for the State of New Mexico from 1919 to 1922. He was a Judge of the New Mexico District Court for the Ninth Judicial District from 1923 to 1929. He served on the state board of bar examiners from 1930 to 1933. He was United States Senator from New Mexico from 1933 to 1949.

== Congressional career ==
Hatch was a presidential elector in 1932. He was appointed on October 10, 1933, as a Democrat to the United States Senate, and was subsequently elected on November 6, 1934, to fill the vacancy caused by the resignation of Sam G. Bratton. He was reelected in 1936 and again in 1942 and served from October 10, 1933, to January 3, 1949. He was not a candidate for renomination in 1948. He is best known as the author of the "Hatch Act" of 1939 and 1940, preventing certain restricted federal employees from engaging in specified political activity. He was Chairman of the Committee on Privileges and Elections for the 77th United States Congress and Chairman of the Committee on Public Lands and Surveys for the 77th, 78th and 79th United States Congresses.

== Federal judicial service ==
Hatch was nominated by President Harry S. Truman on January 13, 1949, to a seat on the United States District Court for the District of New Mexico vacated by Judge Colin Neblett. He was confirmed by the United States Senate on January 17, 1949, and received his commission on January 21, 1949. He served as Chief Judge from 1954 to 1963. He assumed senior status on April 5, 1963. His service terminated on September 15, 1963, due to his death in Albuquerque, New Mexico. He was interred in Fairview Park Cemetery.

== See also ==
- Hatch Act of 1939

Party political offices
| Preceded by Sam G. Bratton | Democratic nominee for U.S. Senator from New Mexico (Class 2); 1934, 1936, 1942 | Succeeded by Clinton Anderson |
U.S. Senate
| Preceded by Sam G. Bratton | U.S. senator (Class 2) from New Mexico; 1933–1949; Served alongside: Bronson M. Cutting, Dennis Chavez | Succeeded by Clinton Presba Anderson |
Legal offices
| Preceded by Colin Neblett | Judge of the United States District Court for the District of New Mexico; 1949–1963 | Succeeded by Harry Vearle Payne |
| Preceded by Office established | Chief Judge of the United States District Court for the District of New Mexico; 1954–1963 | Succeeded by Waldo Henry Rogers |
