= Charles R. Simpson (Tax Court judge) =

American judge (1921–2015)

Charles R. Simpson (June 16, 1921 – January 28, 2015) was a judge of the United States Tax Court from 1965 to 1987.

== Education and career ==
Born in Danville, Illinois, Simpson became blind during childhood. He received a B.A. from the University of Illinois, with highest honors, in 1944, followed by a J.D. from the University of Illinois College of Law in 1945, with high honors, and an LL.M. from Harvard Law School in 1950.

Having been admitted to Illinois Bar in 1945, he entered private practice in Champaign, Illinois in 1946, and served as a member of the Illinois General Assembly from 1947 to 1950. He was a teaching fellow at Harvard Law School from 1950 to 1951, when he became an attorney in the Office of Price Stabilization until 1952, and then served with the Internal Revenue Service, Chief Counsel's Office, Legislation and Regulations Division, until 1965. During this time, he became Assistant Director of this office in 1961, and Director in 1964. He received a meritorious service award from Secretary of the Treasury Dillon on March 29, 1965.

On September 2, 1965, President Lyndon B. Johnson appointed Simpson to a seat on the United States Tax Court vacated by the death Judge Morton P. Fisher, for term expiring June 1, 1968. Simpson was thereafter reappointed for the succeeding term ending June 1, 1980.

This was one of several appointments which went against a previously observed Senate Resolution prohibiting the appointment to that body of persons recently employed by the Treasury Department.

== Personal life and death ==
Simpson married Ruth V. Thomason, and following his retirement from the Tax Court, the couple moved to Sarasota, Florida, in October 1987. Ruth died in 2012, and Simpson died three years later, in Sarasota, at the age of 93.
