= Daniel J. Mollway =

American lawyer

Daniel J. Mollway is an American lawyer and the former executive director of the Hawaii State Ethics Commission.

== Early life ==
Mollway attended the University of Illinois. He moved to Honolulu, Hawaii and studied at the University of Hawaii where he married Susan Oki Mollway, who would later become the first Asian-American woman ever appointed to the federal bench. He later attended Boston College, where he earned his J.D. Daniel and Susan Mollway have a son, Dylan Marcus.

== Professional History ==
=== Academia ===
Mollway has been an instructor at the University of Hawaii.

=== Hawaii State Ethics Commission ===
In 1986, Mollway joined the Hawaii State Ethics Commission as its executive director.

In 2009, the Hawaii Rainbow Warriors traveled to New Orleans to play in the 2008 Sugar Bowl costing the university two million dollars. After a review of the unique circumstances, Mollway and the state Ethics Commission decided to require the university to create a formal policy concerning participation in future postseason events.

==== Controversy and termination ====
In 2010, the commission raised issues with his work habits, particularly his use of sick leave and vacation days, and imposed new work guidelines on him. Mollway said he had taken allowable time off from work to cope with migraines. The commission told him to retire or resign. Although the report did not find that Mollway engaged in any misconduct, and praised his skill and intellect, he was fired after serving as executive director for 24 years. Mollway contemplated legal action to challenge his firing. His attorney said Mollway, as an at-will employee, can be terminated without explanation, "but it can't be an illegal reason," as an illness might be. Common Cause Hawaii, the League of Women Voters of Hawaii and others praised Mollway and questioned the process the commission used to fire him. They prepared testimony in support of Mollway's long and devoted service to the Commission, and his success in elevating its reputation and credibility.

Patrick Boland, a former administrator of the State Health Planning and Development Agency, said the decision appeared extreme, given the nature of the findings in the report, and could lead to the "loss of public trust and respect" for the commission.

=== Law firm ===
In late 2010, Mollway started his own law practice known as Daniel Mollway LLP.
