= Sau Ung Loo Chan =

Hawaii's first female lawyer of Asian descent

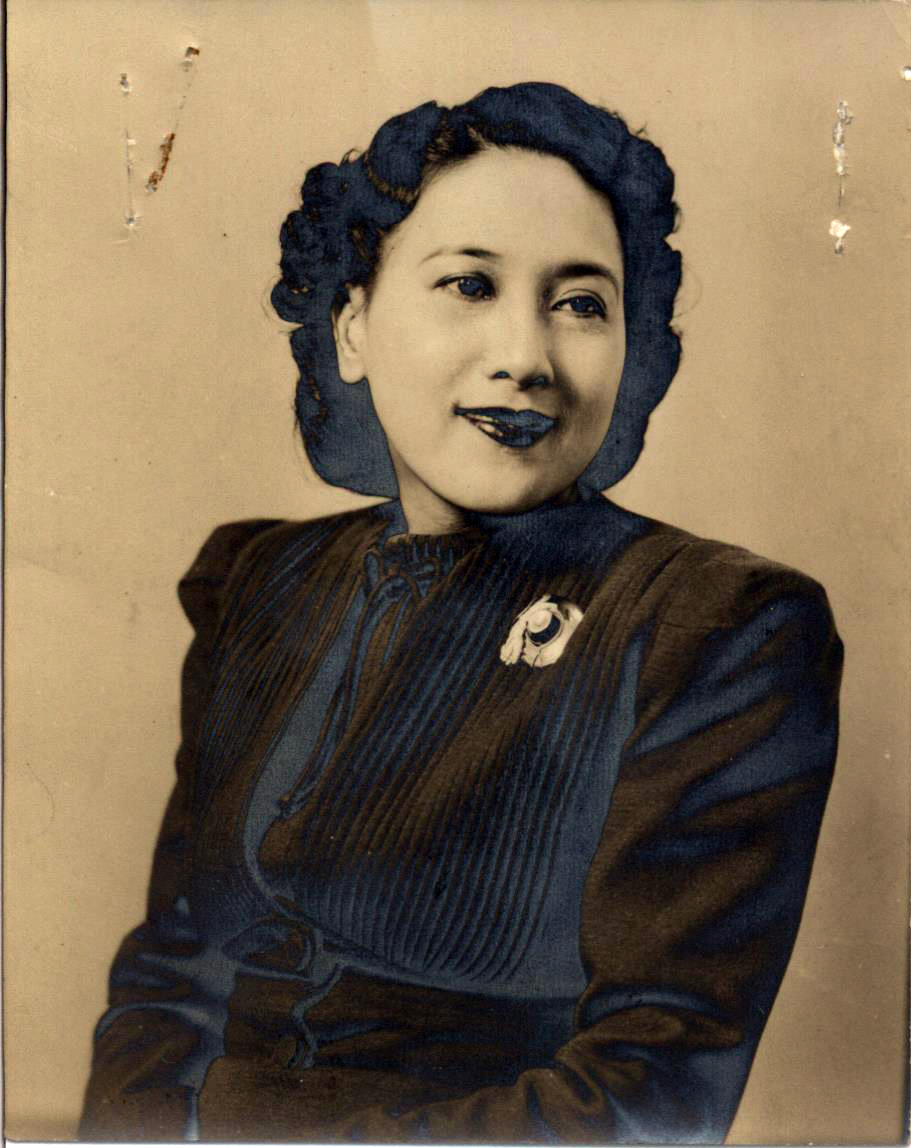
- Photograph of Sau Ung Loo Chan, undated, Official Personnel Folder of Sau Loo Chan; Immigration and Naturalization Service
- Born: August 8, 1906; Honolulu, Territory of Hawaii, U.S.
- Died: March 1, 2002 (aged 95); Kaneohe, Hawaii, U.S.
- Spouse: Hin Cheung Chan (m. 1929) Clarence Loy Ching (m. 1985; died 1985)

Sau Ung Loo Chan (1906–2002) was Hawaii's first female lawyer of Asian descent.

Chan, the youngest child of her family, was born on August 8, 1906, in Honolulu, Hawaii, to Joe and Choy Shee Loo. Her father was a Chinese immigrant and had a close friendship with Sun Yat-sen. Chan completed her higher education at Punahou School and Yale Law School respectively before settling in Hong Kong with her husband Hin Cheung Chan to raise a family.

In 1941, she returned to Hawaii where she was admitted as the first Asian female to practice law. From 1943-1976, Chan organized and oversaw the Circuit Court Small Estate and Guardianship Division. In 1948, Chan testified before the United States Congress in an effort to have certain portions of the Immigration Act of 1924 amended. She practiced as an estate and guardianship attorney.

Chan died on March 1, 2002, in Kaneohe, Hawaii.

== See also ==
- List of first women lawyers and judges in Hawaii
