= Howard C. Bratton =

American judge (1922–2002)

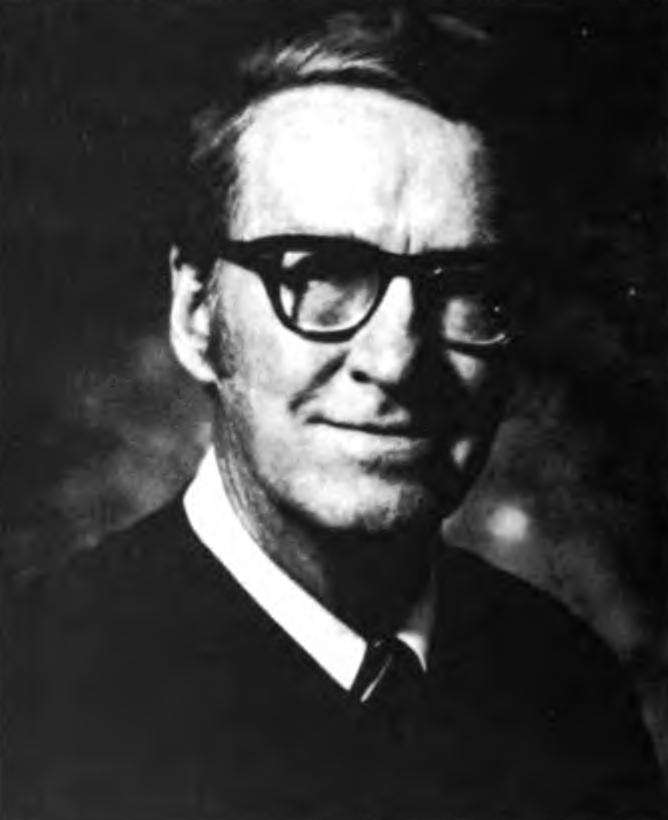
- Bratton in 1990

Senior Judge of the United States District Court for the District of New Mexico
- In office February 4, 1987 – May 5, 2002

Chief Judge of the United States District Court for the District of New Mexico
- In office 1978–1987
- Preceded by: Harry Vearle Payne
- Succeeded by: Santiago E. Campos

Judge of the United States District Court for the District of New Mexico
- In office March 17, 1964 – February 4, 1987
- Appointed by: Lyndon B. Johnson
- Preceded by: Waldo Henry Rogers
- Succeeded by: James Aubrey Parker

Personal details
- Born: Howard Calvin Bratton; February 4, 1922 Clovis, New Mexico
- Died: May 5, 2002 (aged 80)
- Parent: Sam G. Bratton (father)
- Education: University of New Mexico (BA); Yale University (LLB)

Military service
- Branch/service: United States Army
- Years of service: 1942–1945
- Battles/wars: World War II

Howard Calvin Bratton (February 4, 1922 – May 5, 2002) was an American lawyer and jurist who served as a United States district judge of the United States District Court for the District of New Mexico.

== Early life and education ==
Bratton was born in Clovis, New Mexico, the son of politician and jurist Sam G. Bratton. He and graduated from New Mexico Military Institute and received a Bachelor of Arts degree from the University of New Mexico in 1941. Bratton served in the United States Army during World War II from 1942 to 1945 and attained the rank of captain. After the war, he received a Bachelor of Laws from Yale Law School in 1947.

== Career ==
After spending a year as a law clerk for the United States Court of Appeals in 1948, he worked in private practice in Albuquerque, New Mexico, from 1949 to 1952. He was also a special assistant United States attorney in charge of litigation at the Office of Price Stabilization from 1951 to 1952. He returned to private practice in Roswell, New Mexico, from 1952 to 1964. In 1958, Bratton testified before the United States Senate Committee on Interior and Insular Affairs on behalf of the New Mexico Oil & Gas Association.

On March 3, 1964, Bratton was nominated by President Lyndon B. Johnson to a seat on the United States District Court for the District of New Mexico vacated by Judge Waldo Henry Rogers. Bratton was confirmed by the United States Senate on March 14, 1964, and received his commission on March 17, 1964. He served as Chief Judge from 1978 to 1987, assuming senior status on February 4, 1987. Bratton served in that capacity until his death on May 5, 2002.

== Sources ==
Legal offices
Preceded by Waldo Henry Rogers	Judge of the United States District Court for the District of New Mexico; 1964–1987	Succeeded by James Aubrey Parker
Preceded by Harry Vearle Payne	Chief Judge of the United States District Court for the District of New Mexico; 1978–1987	Succeeded by Santiago E. Campos
