= Murder of Therese Wilder =

1948 murder in Honolulu

The murder of Therese Wilder was committed by two escaped convicts James Majors and John Palakiko on March 11, 1948, in Nuuanu Valley on the outskirts of Honolulu, when they broke into her home. They left her bound and gagged, which caused her to suffocate. The two were sentenced to death by the court and nearly executed, but were given a stay of execution and sentenced to prison instead. After the incident Morgan's Corner gained a reputation for being haunted.

== Morgan's Corner ==
Morgan's Corner is a bend on Nuuanu Pali Drive that connected Honolulu to Kāneʻohe before it was superseded by Hawaii Route 61. The bend is after a hairpin turn from the Honolulu side of the bend. Morgan's Corner became referred to as a "corner" because the bend curves the road perpendicularly so that from Honolulu one enters the bend from the north and exits to the east or from Kāneʻohe one enters the bend from the east and exits to the north. The namesake came from Dr. James Morgan, who built his villa on the inside of the bend in the 1920s. Wilder's house was opposite Morgan's, south of the bend.

== Murder ==
At the time of the murder the area was a semirural rainforest. Petty criminals James Majors (19) and John Palakiko (21) escaped a prison work crew on March 10, 1948. The next day they intended to get supplies by burglarizing a neighbor of Therese Wilder (68), widow of William Wilder. The pair were hungry and when they smelled Wilder's cooking they decided to rob her instead. The two men attacked, bound, and gagged Wilder, then left her on her bed. During the struggle Wilder had her jaw broken. She suffocated when she was gagged with a broken jaw. Five days later on March 16 Wilder's gardener Isabelo Escalante and maid Miya Matayoshi found her body.

== Outcomes ==
The Honolulu Board of Supervisors offered a reward for the capture of those responsible for the murder. A few days after the murder, Majors and Palakiko were apprehended. On April 16 they were charged with first degree murder in the court of Judge Carrick Buck. Majors pleaded not guilty and Palakiko requested to postpone his plea. On June 18 the jury found the men guilty of first degree murder and sentenced them to death by hanging.

Some Native Hawaiians, local Chinese, and Japanese, noting the Massie case, thought the sentence showed a double standard in Hawaiian society.

On September 13, 1951, Governor Oren Long issued a stay of execution 15 minutes before their scheduled executions when attorney Harriet Bouslog presented evidence the men gave forced confessions. In 1954 Governor Samuel King commuted the men's sentences from death to 90 years in prison. On December 21, 1962, Governor John Burns commuted the men's sentences to probation. Palakiko violated parole and was sent to prison for three years where he died on September 11, 1974. Majors completed parole on December 20, 1968. Majors moved to Maui where he spent the rest of his life, dying of natural causes in 2009.

After the murder, Morgan's Corner gained a reputation for being haunted. Stories about the road are often variations on the urban legend known as "The Hook".
