= Jean Vaughan Gilbert =

American lawyer

- Born: Jean Vaughan; November 11, 1904; Texarkana, Texas, U.S.
- Died: December 2, 1975 (aged 71); Honolulu, Hawaii, U.S.
- Education: University of Texas at Austin; University of Southern California
- Occupation: Attorney
- Known for: First woman Honolulu City-County Attorney
- Spouse: Melbourne Newcomb Gilbert (m. 1935)

Jean Vaughan Gilbert (November 11, 1904 – December 2, 1975) was an American attorney, and the first woman to be appointed Honolulu City-County Attorney. She set a record at the University of Southern California Law for the highest academic scores at that date. At the time she became an attorney in Hawaii, women were not allowed to serve on a jury, and women lawyers could not use the abbreviation "Esq." after their names.

== Background ==
She was born November 11, 1904, in Texarkana, Texas, to attorney Horace Worth Vaughan and Pearl Lockett Vaughan, joining older sister Aileen and brother Robert Louis. After her birth, her father was elected to the Texas State Senate, and subsequently to the United States House of Representatives. In 1914, her brother graduated from the United States Naval Academy, and was assigned to the USS California. Sister Aileen married in Texas. When her father was appointed assistant district attorney for the US District Court for Hawaii in 1915, Gilbert was the only child still living in their home. Maternal grandmother Ellen Rand Lockett also moved to the territory with them. Within a few months, her father was elevated to District Attorney for the court. When Sanford B. Dole retired as judge of the federal court in 1916, President Woodrow Wilson appointed Vaughan to fill the position.

In March 1920, US Navy Lt. Robert Louis Vaughan died in an airplane crash in Panama. Judge Vaughan brought his son's widow and children to live in Hawaii. When his judicial term expired May 2, 1922, he still had not emotionally recovered from the loss of his son. His health had been in a steadily weakening state, resulting in a stroke. On November 10, he committed suicide. After his death, the family was financially dependent on renting out rooms in their private home.

== Education and early career ==
Gilbert attended the University of Texas, followed by the University of Southern California Law, graduating Cum Laude Order of California in 1930, while setting a record for the highest academic scores. Following her passing of the California bar exam, she was admitted to practice before the U. S. District Court in Hawaii. After she passed the Hawaii exam, she was admitted to the Hawaii Bar on April 8, 1931. At that time, the "Esq." commonly used as a title for male lawyers, was not allowed to be used by women lawyers in Hawaii, and women were not allowed to serve on jury duty in the territory. She was not the first woman admitted to the bar in Hawaii, but the media noted that she was the "first blonde woman" to do so, and was a cook who "knows her pots and pans".

She set up practice as a member of the law firm of Kemp and Stainbeck. When partner Ingram Stainback was named U. S. Attorney in 1934, he brought her on board as his assistant attorney. Together, they acted as counsel for the government in matters of water and land rights.

== Marriage and return to Hawaii ==
Her career was put on hold for several years after her October 7, 1935, marriage to US Navy captain Melbourne Newcomb Gilbert, who was stationed in Vallejo, California. Upon the couple's 1940 return to Hawaii, she was once again appointed Assistant U. S. District Attorney, this time by acting U. S. District Attorney Angus M. Taylor. After the attack on Pearl Harbor, the territory was placed under martial law by territorial governor Joseph Poindexter, approved by President Franklin D. Roosevelt. The writ of habeas corpus was suspended. One of the cases she worked on was that of Honolulu doctor of naturopathy Hans Zimmerman, who challenged his arrest and detention with no charges filed against him.

Her former boss Ingram Stainback was appointed territorial governor on August 24, 1942, and Gilbert was appointed City-County Deputy Attorney by City-County Attorney Cable A. Wirtz. In 1944, Wirtz became Circuit Judge, and with unanimous approval from the county board of supervisors, Honolulu mayor Lester Petrie appointed Gilbert the City-County Attorney, the first woman to hold that position. She was a steadfast advocate for the city and county. One of her last cases put her at odds with the supervisors, who had followed territorial legislation and allocated funds for back pay to litigant county employee Llewelyn H. L. Hart, covering the period he had been suspended pending the outcome of legal action. She argued in 1946 that the county was not obligated to compensate for the withheld wages, and should not reimburse Hart. The backlash to her legal opinion was so intense that supervisor Nicholas T. Teves threatened to introduce a motion to have her fired. She held firm to her position, and eventually took a sabbatical to California. When Petrie's term ended January 2, 1947, she and others in his cabinet resigned.

== Later life and legacy ==
After resigning her position with the city and county, she went into private practice, and until 1967 contracted her services to the Honolulu Board of Water Supply.

Although physically impaired for the last 15 years of her life, she continued to be active. She died December 2, 1975, and was buried at the National Memorial Cemetery of the Pacific. Her husband survived her.

She played a key role in the legal career of Thomas Shoichi Ogata who went on to become a justice of the Supreme Court of Hawaii. Previously denied admittance to the Hawaii Bar in 1942, for a cheating incident during the bar exam, he nevertheless became her law clerk. Based on her personal recommendation, he was admitted to the Hawaii Bar in 1945, and she appointed him as Deputy City-County Attorney.

== Sources ==
- Weil, Bambi E. (September 1992). "Jean Vaughan Gilbert". In Matsuda, Mari J (ed.). Called from Within: Early Women Lawyers of Hawaiʻi. University of Hawaii Press. pp. 86–104. ISBN 978-0-8248-1448-9.
