= Carrick Hume Buck =

American lawyer

Carrick Hume Buck (July 5, 1900 – October 18, 1959) was the first woman to be appointed a judge in Hawaii.

== Early life ==
Buck was born in Las Vegas, New Mexico on July 5, 1900 to Arthur Perry Buck and Henrietta Hume Pettijohn. As a child, Buck was sickly and spent most of her time indoors. She witnessed a murder when she was 18, and had to serve as a witness in the court case. While in court, she watched Earl Rogers' defense, and was inspired to study law. She graduated from the University of Southern California in 1920. Buck was the first woman to pass the California Bar exam. She worked for two years in Los Angeles, then moved to Hawaii.

== Hawaii ==
Buck passed the Hawaii Bar exam in 1924. As she was only the third woman to practice law in Hawaii, she was the first woman to hold many of the positions she was appointed to throughout her career. She became the assistant U.S. District Attorney for the Territory of Hawaii in 1925, and led raids on illegal okolehao stills. Soon after she started this position, however, she became an attorney at the City and County of Honolulu's attorney's office. Two years later, she entered private practice.

In 1928, Buck ran for a seat in the Hawaii Territorial House of Representatives. She lost, and chose not to run again, but remained an active member of the Democratic Party of Hawaii.

In 1934, Buck was appointed to replace William Charles Achi Jr. on the Fifth Circuit Court on Kauai by President Franklin D. Roosevelt. She regularly substituted in other courts in Hawaii, including the Hawaii Supreme Court in 1935. She was appointed to the First Circuit Court in Honolulu in 1942. Buck retired from the bench in 1958, and was replaced by Edgar Crumpacker. Later that year, she opened her own practice. Out of the 4,000 judgments she made throughout her career, only 9 were reversed. Notable cases she presided over include the Morgan's Corner murder.

Buck died of pneumonia on October 18, 1959 at Queen's Hospital.

== See also ==
- List of first women lawyers and judges in Hawaii
