= Hawaii State Bar Association =

Bar Association

- Type: Legal Society
- Location: United States
- Members: 7300 in 2012 (2200 out of state)
- Website: https://hsba.org/

The Hawaii State Bar Association (HSBA) is the integrated (mandatory) bar association of the U.S. state of Hawaii.

== History ==
The Hawaii State Bar Association was founded as a voluntary membership organization in 1899. In 1985 it was formally incorporated as a 501(c)(6) non-profit trade organization.

In 1952, the Hawaii Bar News began publication; it is now known as Hawaii Bar Journal.

In 1989, the Supreme Court of the State of Hawaii created a unified bar, pursuant to Supreme Court Rule 17. As a result, all persons admitted to the practice of law in Hawaii must be members of HSBA.

== Structure ==
HSBA policy is set by a Board of 21 voting members (5 officers, 15 directors and the YLD President). There are 15 Committees, 20 Sections, and an elected Young Lawyers Division Board with 16 members.

HSBA employs 16 staff members, led by an Executive Director who is in charge of the overall operation and administration of the HSBA and is responsible for making sure that the Board's policies and HSBA programs and activities are carried out.
