= List of University of New Mexico School of Law alumni =

Following is a list of notable alumni of the University of New Mexico School of Law. The dates listed are the year of graduation.

== Government ==
- Gloria Tristani, member of the Federal Communications Commission (FCC), 1997–2001

== Judiciary ==
=== U.S. courts ===
- Christina Armijo, 1975, judge of the United States District Court for the District of New Mexico
- Robert C. Brack, 1978, judge of the United States District Court for the District of New Mexico
- Joel M. Carson III, 1997, judge of the United States Court of Appeals for the Tenth Circuit
- Sarah M. Davenport, 2006, judge of the United States District Court for the District of New Mexico
- Matthew L. Garcia, 2005, judge of the United States District Court for the District of New Mexico
- Kenneth J. Gonzales, 1994, judge of the United States District Court for the District of New Mexico
- Paul W. Grimm, 1976, judge of the United States District Court for the District of Maryland
- Curtis LeRoy Hansen, 1961, judge of the United States District Court for the District of New Mexico
- Katherine Maraman, 1976, justice of the Supreme Court of Guam
- Jimmie V. Reyna, 1978, judge of the United States Court of Appeals for the Federal Circuit
- David Herrera Urias, 2001, judge of the United States District Court for the District of New Mexico
- Ramona Villagomez Manglona, 1996, chief judge of the United States District Court for the Northern Mariana Islands

=== Supreme Court of New Mexico ===
- Edward L. Chávez, 1981, Supreme Court of New Mexico
- Charles W. Daniels, 1969, Supreme Court of New Mexico
- Thomas J. Mabry, Supreme Court of New Mexico
- Petra Jimenez Maes, 1973, Supreme Court of New Mexico
- Judith Nakamura, 1989, Supreme Court of New Mexico
- Dan Sosa Jr., 1951, Supreme Court of New Mexico
- Barbara J. Vigil, 1985, Supreme Court of New Mexico

== Law ==
- Paul Bloom, lawyer who recovered $6 billion for the United States Department of Energy
- David Iglesias, 1984, judge advocate (JAG), at the Pentagon, member of the legal team that was the inspiration for the film A Few Good Men, United States attorney for the District of New Mexico
- Gary King, 1984, 30th attorney general of New Mexico
- Gertrude Lee, 2009, chief prosecutor of the Navajo Nation

== Nonprofit ==
- John EchoHawk, 1970, founder of Native American Rights Fund (NARF)

== Politics ==
- Hector Balderas, 2001, New Mexico attorney general, former New Mexico State Auditor, and former state representative
- Charles W. Blackwell, 1972, first ambassador of the Chickasaw Nation to the United States, 1995–2013
- Jacob Candelaria, 2016, first openly gay man elected to New Mexico Legislature, member of the New Mexico Senate
- John Anthony Castro, 2012, candidate for U.S. Senate
- Brian Colón, 2001, New Mexico state auditor and former chairman of the Democratic Party of New Mexico
- Brian Egolf, 2005, former speaker of the House in New Mexico, House Minority Leader, chair of House Energy Committee, and representative of District 47
- Deb Haaland, United States Secretary of the Interior, formerly U.S. representative for New Mexico's 1st Congressional District and one of the first two Native American women elected to Congress
- Kathleen Kennedy Townsend, 1978, lieutenant governor of Maryland
- Georgene Louis, 2004, member of the New Mexico House of Representatives
- Michelle Lujan Grisham, 1987, 32nd governor of New Mexico, U.S. House representative for New Mexico's 1st District (2013-2019)
- Thomas J. Mabry, 14th governor of New Mexico
- Jonathan Rothschild, 1977, mayor of Tucson, Arizona
- Steven Schiff, 1972, U.S. House representative
- Xochitl Torres Small, U.S. House representative for New Mexico's 2nd congressional district
- Tom Udall, 1977, United States ambassador to New Zealand and Samoa
- John Wertheim, 1995, chairman of the Democratic Party of New Mexico

== Fictional alumni ==
- Kimberly Wexler, main character on the television series Better Call Saul
