= Carmen E. Garza =

American jurist

Chief Magistrate Judge of the United States District Court for the District of New Mexico
- In office February 8, 2018 – August 22, 2022
- Preceded by: Karen B. Molzen
- Succeeded by: Gregory B. Wormuth

Magistrate Judge of the United States District Court for the District of New Mexico
- In office August 23, 2006 – August 22, 2022

Personal details
- Born: 1959 or 1960 (age 66–67)
- Education: New Mexico State University (Bachelor's degree); University of New Mexico (JD)

Carmen E. Garza is a former chief magistrate judge of the United States District Court for the District of New Mexico. She served as a magistrate judge from August 2006 to August 22, 2022, holding the position of chief magistrate judge from early 2018 until the end of her tenure on the bench. In 2022, the U.S. District Court for the District of New Mexico voted against reappointing Garza for a further term as magistrate judge as a result of misconduct allegations against her.

== Education ==
Garza earned a bachelor's degree from New Mexico State University and her Juris Doctor from the University of New Mexico School of Law.

== Legal career ==
Following her graduation from law school, Garza served as an Assistant Public Defender for the State of New Mexico from 1986 to 1989. Garza then moved to private practice, where she primarily represented parties in criminal proceedings in Las Cruces and Albuquerque. For a time, Garza was joined in private practice by her father, a retired district attorney. While in private practice, Garza was a founding member of the New Mexico Women's Bar Association.

== Federal judicial service ==
=== Magistrate judge tenure ===
In August 2006, Garza was selected by the U.S. District Court for the District of New Mexico as a magistrate judge. She worked primarily at the federal courthouse in Las Cruces. Garza was reappointed for a second eight-year term as magistrate judge in 2014.

Garza was among five names suggested to President Barack Obama by New Mexico Senators Jeff Bingaman and Tom Udall as a replacement for U.S. Chief District Judge Bruce D. Black, who took senior status in 2012. Black was ultimately succeeded by U.S. District Judge Kenneth J. Gonzales.

On January 12, 2018, Garza was named as chief magistrate judge for the U.S. District Court for the District of New Mexico by order of U.S. Chief District Judge M. Christina Armijo. Garza's term as chief magistrate judge began on February 8, 2018, and was scheduled to end no later than February 7, 2025.

In late 2021, the U.S. District Court for the District of New Mexico posted public notice concerning Garza's potential reappointment for a third eight-year term as magistrate judge. After misconduct proceedings were filed against her, Garza withdrew her request to be reappointed, and the District Court voted not to reappoint her to a third term. The vote not to reappoint Garza was a direct result of the investigation into the misconduct complaint against her, according to the panel that conducted the investigation.

Garza's tenure as magistrate judge ended on August 22, 2022. Garza was succeeded as chief magistrate judge by Gregory B. Wormuth.

==== Misconduct allegations ====
A misconduct complaint was filed against Garza with the Judicial Council for the United States Court of Appeals for the Tenth Circuit before her tenure as magistrate judge ended. The complainants, all of whom had previously worked for Garza as law clerks or in other capacities, alleged that Garza had "created an abusive and hostile work environment". Garza denied the allegations but indicated "willingness to take appropriate corrective action".

Tenth Circuit Chief Judge Timothy M. Tymkovich appointed a Special Committee of the Judicial Council to investigate the complainants' allegations. Based on the "source, nature, and consistency of the evidence", the Special Committee preliminarily "determined that Judge Garza created what appeared to be an abusive and hostile work environment through a pattern of conduct." The Judicial Council also noted some evidence that Garza continued to engage in abusive behavior even as the Special Committee was conducting its investigation.

Because the Judicial Council lacked further jurisdiction over the complaint against Garza after her tenure as magistrate judge ended, the panel concluded the misconduct proceedings on September 14, 2022, without reaching any final findings on the merits of the allegations against her. However, in a rare public order, the Judicial Council expressed concern regarding "the continuing lack of awareness of what specifically constitutes abusive conduct and a hostile work environment" in the courts overseen by the Tenth Circuit, and it directed court personnel to better educate federal judges and their employees on appropriate workplace conduct and the prohibitions on retaliation against court staff. The Judicial Council's decision appeared to be the first time that an order had addressed abusive conduct by a federal judge since new protections for judiciary employees were implemented in 2019.

In a statement to the Washington Post following release of the order, Garza disputed the Judicial Council's preliminary findings, attributed the allegations against her to "incorrect perceptions on the part of the complainants", and suggested that she may appeal the decision. Garza subsequently filed a petition for review of the Judicial Council's order with the Committee on Judicial Conduct and Disability of the Judicial Conference of the United States, but this petition was denied.

== Personal life ==
Garza is the daughter of former New Mexico Third Judicial District Attorney Lalo Garza and Margie Garza.

Garza is the older sister of former Doña Ana County Magistrate Judge Carlos Garza. Carlos Garza was also the subject of a judicial misconduct investigation, having been removed from the bench by the New Mexico Supreme Court in 2006 and barred from holding judicial office following allegations abuse of position.

Garza is also sister to former Las Cruces city manager Robert Garza.
