= Judge Garcia =

Judge Garcia may refer to:

- Brad Garcia (born 1986), judge of the United States Court of Appeals for the District of Columbia Circuit
- Edward J. Garcia (1928–2023), judge of the United States District Court for the Eastern District of California
- Hipolito Frank Garcia (1925–2002), judge of the United States District Court for the Western District of Texas
- Matthew L. Garcia (born 1974), judge of the United States District Court for the District of New Mexico
- Orlando Luis Garcia (born 1952), judge of the United States District Court for the Western District of Texas

== See also ==
- Jay A. García-Gregory (born 1944), judge of the United States District Court for the District of Puerto Rico
- Cancio Garcia (1937–2013), associate justice of the Supreme Court of the Philippines
