= Margaret Strickland (judge) =

American judge (born 1980)

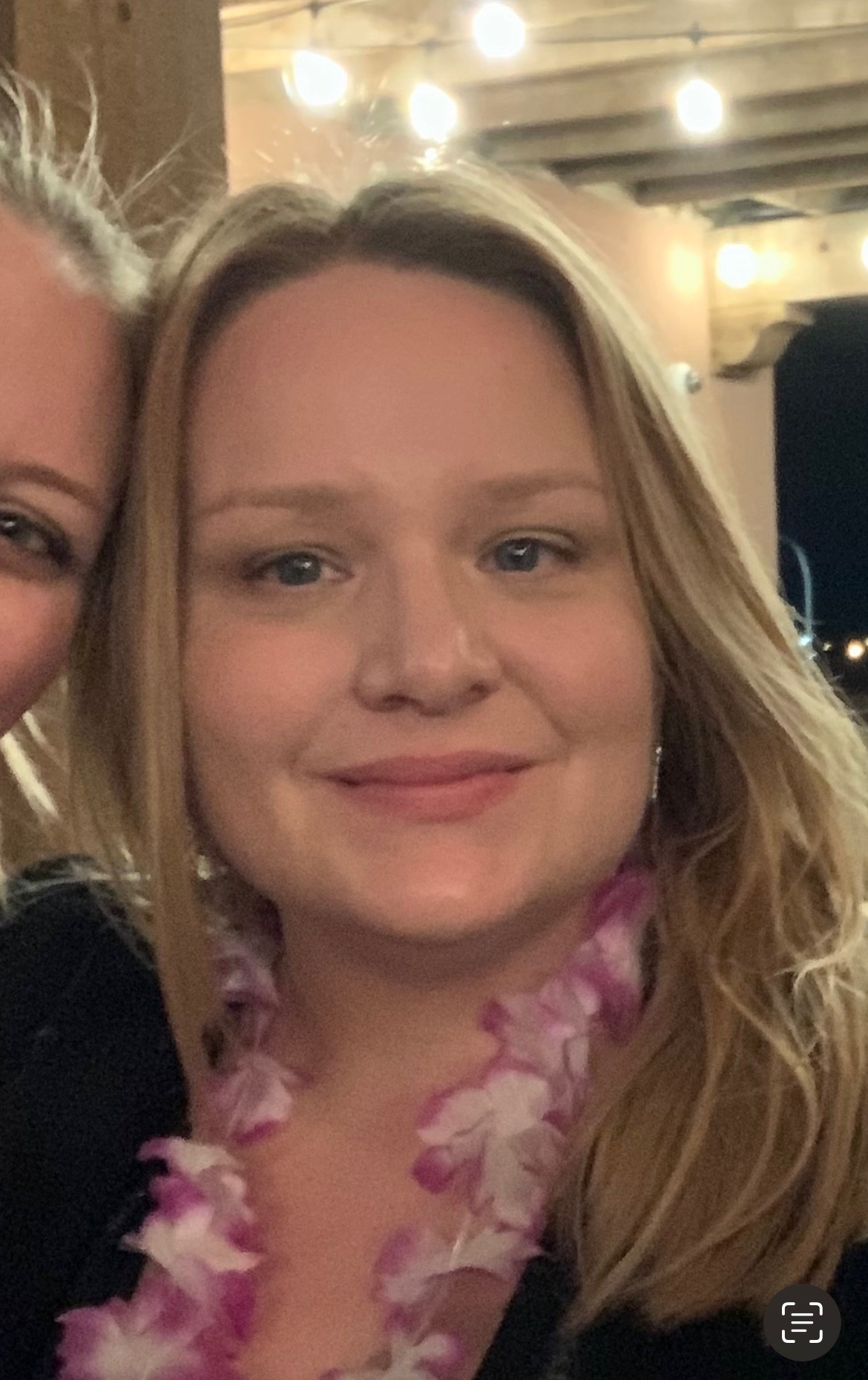

Judge of the United States District Court for the District of New Mexico
- Incumbent
- Assumed office October 22, 2021
- Appointed by: Joe Biden
- Preceded by: Robert C. Brack

Personal details
- Born: 1980 (age 45–46) Denton, Texas, U.S.
- Education: University of Texas at El Paso (BA); New York University (JD)

Margaret Irene Strickland (born 1980) is an American attorney serving as a United States district judge of the United States District Court for the District of New Mexico.

== Education ==
Strickland received a Bachelor of Arts degree from the University of Texas at El Paso in 2003 and a Juris Doctor from New York University School of Law in 2006.

== Career ==
She started her career at the law offices of the New Mexico Public Defender from 2006 to 2011. From 2011 to 2021, she was a partner at McGraw & Strickland LLC in Las Cruces, New Mexico. From 2017 to 2019, she served as president of the New Mexico Criminal Defense Lawyers Association.

=== Federal judicial service ===
On March 30, 2021, President Joe Biden announced his intent to nominate Strickland to serve as a United States district judge for the United States District Court for the District of New Mexico. On April 19, 2021, her nomination was sent to the Senate. President Biden nominated Strickland to the seat vacated by Judge Robert C. Brack, who assumed senior status on July 25, 2018. On May 26, 2021, a hearing on her nomination was held before the Senate Judiciary Committee. On June 24, 2021, her nomination was reported out of committee on by a 12–10 vote. On September 21, 2021, the United States Senate invoked cloture on her nomination by a 52–46 vote. Her nomination was confirmed later that day by a 52–45 vote. She received her judicial commission on October 22, 2021, and was sworn in by Judge Kenneth J. Gonzales on October 25, 2021.

Legal offices
| Preceded by Robert C. Brack | Judge of the United States District Court for the District of New Mexico; 2021–present | Incumbent |
