= Kea W. Riggs =

American judge (born 1965)

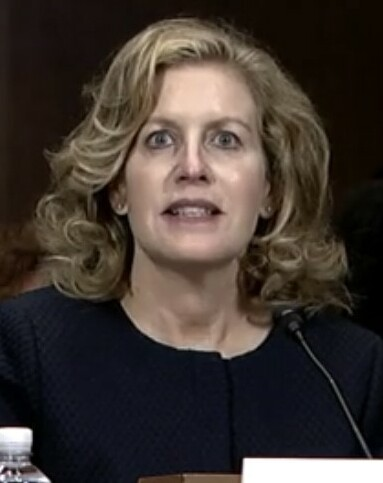

Judge of the United States District Court for the District of New Mexico
- Incumbent
- Assumed office December 31, 2019
- Appointed by: Donald Trump
- Preceded by: Christina Armijo

Judge of the Fifth Judicial District Court of New Mexico
- In office August 8, 2014 – December 31, 2019
- Appointed by: Susana Martinez

Magistrate Judge of the United States District Court for the District of New Mexico
- In office April 13, 2001 – August 8, 2014

Personal details
- Born: Kea Lynn Whetzal; 1965 (age 60–61) Midwest City, Oklahoma, U.S.
- Party: Republican
- Spouse: Stanton Riggs
- Children: 2
- Education: University of Oklahoma (BBA, JD)

Kea Lynn Whetzal Riggs (née Whetzal; born 1965) is an American attorney and jurist serving as a United States district judge of the United States District Court for the District of New Mexico.

== Education ==
Riggs was born in Midwest City, Oklahoma. She earned her Bachelor of Business Administration from the University of Oklahoma and her Juris Doctor from the University of Oklahoma College of Law.

== Career ==
Riggs worked in private practice with Sanders, Bruin, Coll, & Worley in Roswell, New Mexico, and served the State of New Mexico as a senior trial prosecutor, children's court attorney, and Assistant District Attorney.

=== State court service ===
She was appointed a judge of the Fifth Judicial District Court of New Mexico by Governor Susana Martinez on August 8, 2014. Her service on the state district court, which covers the southeastern corner of the state, terminated on December 31, 2019, when she received her commission as a federal judge.

=== Federal judicial service ===
==== Magistrate judge ====
Riggs served as a United States magistrate judge of the United States District Court for the District of New Mexico, a position she was appointed to on April 13, 2001, and left on August 8, 2014, upon becoming a state district judge.

==== District court ====
On May 3, 2019, President Donald Trump announced his intent to nominate Riggs to serve as a United States district judge of the United States District Court for the District of New Mexico. On May 13, 2019, her nomination was sent to the Senate to the seat vacated by Judge Christina Armijo, who assumed senior status on February 7, 2018. On June 26, 2019, a hearing on her nomination was held before the Senate Judiciary Committee. On July 18, 2019, her nomination was reported out of committee by voice vote. On December 18, 2019, the United States Senate invoked cloture on her nomination by a 92–1 vote. On December 19, 2019, her nomination was confirmed by a 94–0 vote. She received her judicial commission on December 31, 2019, and was sworn in by Senior Judge Bobby Baldock later that day.

=== Academics ===
She was an adjunct professor at Eastern New Mexico State University–Roswell from 2001 to 2002, 2008 to 2009, and 2012 to 2014. She was adjunct professor at New Mexico Highlands University–Roswell from 2006 to 2009 and again in 2011.

== Personal life ==
She is married to Stanton Riggs, also an attorney. They have two children.

Legal offices
Preceded by Christina Armijo	Judge of the United States District Court for the District of New Mexico; 2019–present	Incumbent
