= Senator Conway =

Senator Conway may refer to:

- James F. Conway (born 1933), Missouri State Senate
- Joan Carter Conway (born 1951), Maryland State Senate
- John Edwards Conway (1934–2014), New Mexico State Senate
- Steve Conway (politician) (born 1944), Washington State Senate
