= List of federal judges appointed by George W. Bush =

Following is a list of all Article III United States federal judges appointed by President George W. Bush during his presidency, including a partial list of judges appointed under Article I.

In total Bush appointed 327 Article III federal judges, including two justices to the Supreme Court of the United States (including one chief justice), 62 judges to the United States courts of appeals, 261 judges to the United States district courts and 2 judges to the United States Court of International Trade. Additionally, he made appointments to various courts established under Article I and Article IV.

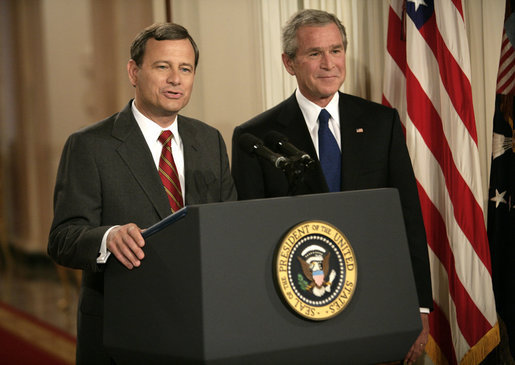
President George W. Bush looks on as his nominee for Chief Justice, John Roberts, speaks.

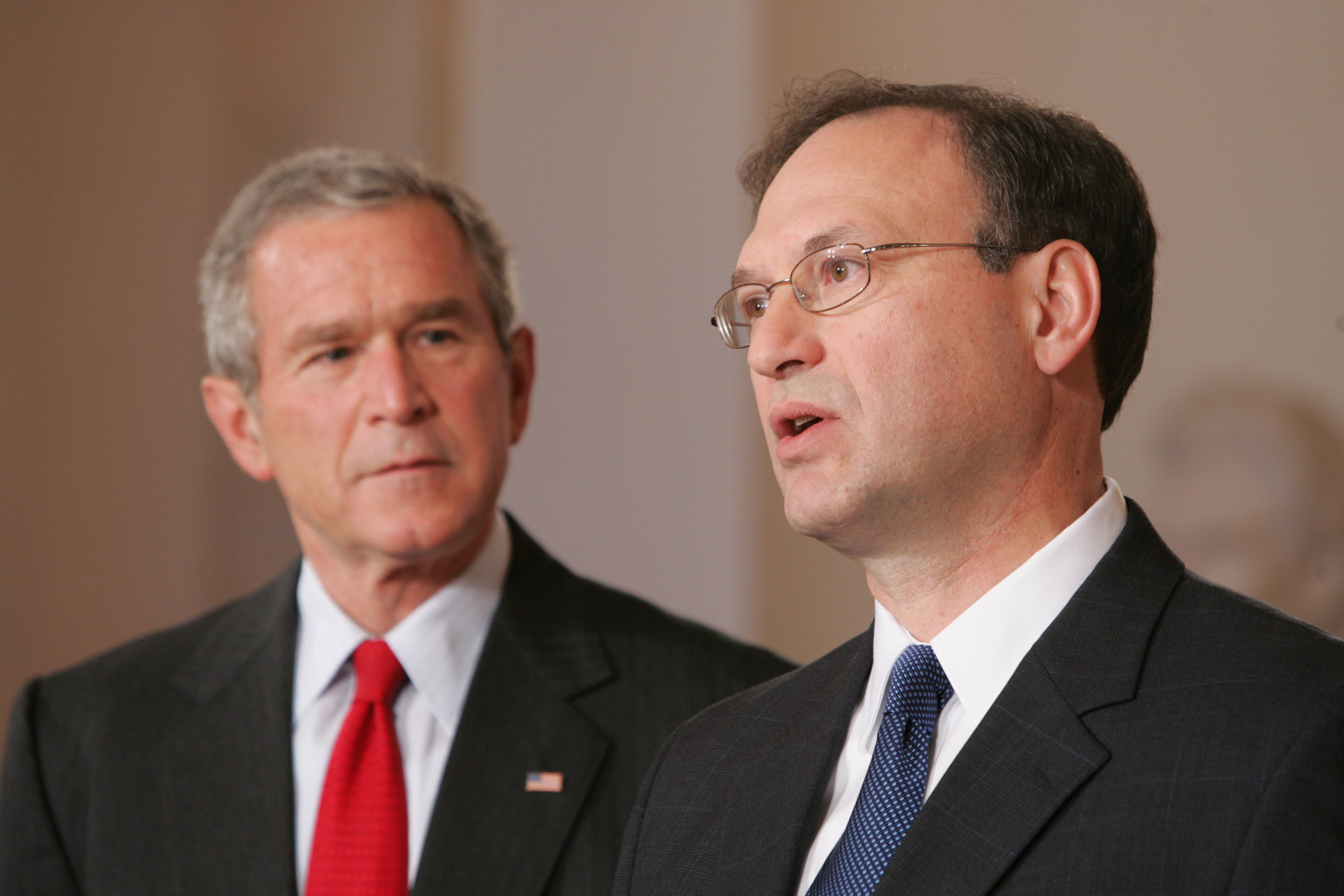
Bush and his second nominee to the Supreme Court, Samuel Alito.

== United States Supreme Court justices ==
#	Justice	Seat	State	Former justice	Nomination date	Confirmation date	Confirmation vote	Began active service	Ended active service
1	John Roberts	Chief	Maryland	William Rehnquist	September 6, 2005 (Note: Originally nominated on July 19, 2005, to the Associate Justice seat being vacated by Sandra Day O'Connor. Upon Rehnquist's death, the Associate Justice nomination was withdrawn and he was instead nominated to be Chief Justice.)	September 29, 2005	78–22	September 29, 2005	Incumbent
2	Samuel Alito	8	Virginia	Sandra Day O'Connor	November 10, 2005	January 31, 2006	58–42	January 31, 2006	Incumbent

== Courts of appeals ==
#	Judge	Circuit	Nomination date	Confirmation date	Confirmation vote	Began active service	Ended active service	Ended senior status
1	Roger Gregory	Fourth	May 9, 2001	July 20, 2001	93–1	December 27, 2000	Incumbent	–
2	William J. Riley	Eighth	May 23, 2001	August 2, 2001	97–0	August 3, 2001	June 30, 2017	January 27, 2023
3	Sharon Prost	Federal	May 21, 2001 (Note: Renominated on September 4, 2001, after the initial nomination expired.)	September 21, 2001	97–0	September 24, 2001	Incumbent	–
4	Barrington D. Parker Jr.	Second	May 9, 2001	October 11, 2001	100–0	October 16, 2001	October 10, 2009	Incumbent
5	Edith Brown Clement	Fifth	May 9, 2001	November 13, 2001	99–0	November 26, 2001	May 14, 2018	Incumbent
6	Harris Hartz	Tenth	June 21, 2001	December 6, 2001	99–0	December 10, 2001	Incumbent	–
7	Michael Joseph Melloy	Eighth	July 10, 2001	February 11, 2002	91–0	February 14, 2002	February 1, 2013	October 20, 2026
8	Terrence L. O'Brien	Tenth	August 2, 2001	April 15, 2002	98–0	April 16, 2002	April 30, 2013	Incumbent
9	Jeffrey R. Howard	First	August 2, 2001	April 23, 2002	99–0	May 3, 2002	March 31, 2022	Incumbent
10	Lavenski Smith	Eighth	May 22, 2001	July 15, 2002	voice vote	July 19, 2002	Incumbent	–
11	Richard Clifton	Ninth	June 22, 2001	July 18, 2002	98–0	July 30, 2002	December 31, 2016	Incumbent
12	Julia Smith Gibbons	Sixth	October 9, 2001	July 29, 2002	95–0	July 31, 2002	September 17, 2024	Incumbent
13	D. Brooks Smith	Third	September 10, 2001	July 31, 2002	64–35	August 2, 2002	December 4, 2021	Incumbent
14	Reena Raggi	Second	May 1, 2002	September 20, 2002	85–0	October 4, 2002	August 31, 2018	Incumbent
15	John M. Rogers	Sixth	December 19, 2001	November 14, 2002	voice vote	November 26, 2002	May 15, 2018	Incumbent
16	Michael W. McConnell	Tenth	May 9, 2001	November 15, 2002	voice vote	November 26, 2002	August 31, 2009	–
17	Dennis Shedd	Fourth	May 9, 2001	November 19, 2002	55–44	November 26, 2002	January 30, 2018	May 2, 2022
18	Jay Bybee	Ninth	May 22, 2002 (Note: Renominated on January 7, 2003, after the initial nomination expired.)	March 13, 2003	74–19	March 21, 2003	December 31, 2019	Incumbent
19	Timothy Tymkovich	Tenth	May 25, 2001 (Note: Renominated on September 4, 2001, and January 7, 2003.)	April 1, 2003	58–41	April 1, 2003	November 16, 2026	Incumbent
20	Jeffrey Sutton	Sixth	May 9, 2001	April 29, 2003	52–41	May 5, 2003	October 1, 2026	Incumbent
21	Edward C. Prado	Fifth	February 6, 2003	May 1, 2003	97–0	May 5, 2003	April 2, 2018	–
22	Deborah L. Cook	Sixth	May 9, 2001	May 5, 2003	66–25	May 7, 2003	March 6, 2019	Incumbent
23	John Roberts	D.C.	May 9, 2001 (Note: Was previously nominated by President George H. W. Bush on January 27, 1992 to a different seat on the same court. That nomination expired at the end of the term. Renominated by President George W. Bush on May 9, 2001 to a different seat on the same court. Renominated on September 4, 2001, and January 7, 2003.)	May 8, 2003	voice vote	June 2, 2003	September 29, 2005	Elevated
24	Consuelo Callahan	Ninth	February 12, 2003	May 22, 2003	99–0	May 28, 2003	Incumbent	–
25	Michael Chertoff	Third	March 5, 2003	June 9, 2003	88–1	June 10, 2003	February 15, 2005	–
26	Richard C. Wesley	Second	March 5, 2003	June 11, 2003	96–0	June 12, 2003	August 1, 2016	Incumbent
27	Allyson K. Duncan	Fourth	March 28, 2003	July 17, 2003	93–0	August 15, 2003	March 21, 2019	July 30, 2019
28	Steven Colloton	Eighth	February 12, 2003	September 4, 2003	94–1	September 10, 2003	Incumbent	–
29	Carlos Bea	Ninth	April 11, 2003	September 29, 2003	86–0	October 1, 2003	December 12, 2019	Incumbent
30	D. Michael Fisher	Third	May 1, 2003	December 9, 2003	voice vote	December 11, 2003	February 1, 2017	Incumbent
31	Charles W. Pickering	Fifth	May 25, 2001 (Note: Renominated on September 4, 2001, January 7, 2003, and February 6, 2004.)	N/A	N/A	January 16, 2004	December 8, 2004	–
32	William H. Pryor Jr.	Eleventh	April 9, 2003 (Note: Renominated on March 12, 2004, and February 14, 2005.)	June 9, 2005	53–45	February 20, 2004	Incumbent	–
33	Franklin Van Antwerpen	Third	November 21, 2003 (Note: Was previously nominated by President George H. W. Bush on September 11, 1991 to a different seat on the same court. That nomination expired at the end of the term. Renominated by President George W. Bush on November 21, 2003 to a different seat on the same court.)	May 20, 2004	96–0	May 24, 2004	October 23, 2006	July 25, 2016
34	Raymond Gruender	Eighth	September 29, 2003	May 20, 2004	97–1	June 5, 2004	Incumbent	–
35	Duane Benton	Eighth	February 12, 2004	June 24, 2004	voice vote	July 2, 2004	June 21, 2026	Incumbent
36	Peter W. Hall	Second	December 9, 2003	June 24, 2004	voice vote	July 7, 2004	March 4, 2021	March 11, 2021
37	Diane S. Sykes	Seventh	November 14, 2003	June 24, 2004	70–27	July 1, 2004	October 1, 2025	Incumbent
38	Priscilla Richman	Fifth	May 9, 2001 (Note: Renominated on September 4, 2001, January 7, 2003, and February 14, 2005.)	May 25, 2005	55–43	June 3, 2005	Incumbent	–
39	Janice Rogers Brown	D.C.	July 25, 2003 (Note: Renominated on February 14, 2005, after the initial nomination expired.)	June 8, 2005	56–43	June 10, 2005	August 31, 2017	–
40	David McKeague	Sixth	November 8, 2001 (Note: Renominated on January 7, 2003, and February 14, 2005.)	June 9, 2005	96–0	June 10, 2005	November 1, 2017	Incumbent
41	Richard Allen Griffin	Sixth	June 26, 2002	June 9, 2005	95–0	June 10, 2005	Incumbent	–
42	Thomas B. Griffith	D.C.	May 10, 2004	June 14, 2005	73–24	June 29, 2005	September 1, 2020	–
43	Susan Bieke Neilson	Sixth	November 8, 2001	October 27, 2005	97–0	November 9, 2005	January 25, 2006	–
44	Michael Chagares	Third	January 25, 2006	April 4, 2006	98–0	April 20, 2006	Incumbent	–
45	Milan Smith	Ninth	February 13, 2006	May 16, 2006	93–0	May 18, 2006	Incumbent	–
46	Brett Kavanaugh	D.C.	July 25, 2003 (Note: Renominated on February 14, 2005, and January 25, 2006.)	May 26, 2006	57–36	May 30, 2006	October 6, 2018	Elevated
47	Sandra Segal Ikuta	Ninth	February 8, 2006	June 19, 2006	81–0	June 23, 2006	November 7, 2025	December 7, 2025
48	Bobby Shepherd	Eighth	May 18, 2006	July 20, 2006	voice vote	October 10, 2006	Incumbent	–
49	Neil Gorsuch	Tenth	May 10, 2006	July 20, 2006	voice vote	August 8, 2006	April 9, 2017	Elevated
50	Jerome Holmes	Tenth	May 4, 2006 (Note: Originally nominated on February 14, 2006, to the Northern District of Oklahoma. The nomination was withdrawn on May 4, 2006. Subsequently nominated to the Tenth Circuit on May 4, 2006.)	July 25, 2006	67–30	August 9, 2006	Incumbent	–
51	Kimberly A. Moore	Federal	May 18, 2006	September 5, 2006	92–0	September 8, 2006	Incumbent	–
52	Kent A. Jordan	Third	June 28, 2006	December 8, 2006	91–0	December 13, 2006	January 15, 2025	–
53	N. Randy Smith	Ninth	January 16, 2007 (Note: Was originally nominated to a seat on December 16, 2005. Renominated on September 5, 2006, November 15, 2006, and January 9, 2007. Withdrawn and nominated to a different seat on the same court on January 16, 2007.)	February 15, 2007	94–0	March 19, 2007	August 11, 2018	Incumbent
54	Thomas Hardiman	Third	September 13, 2006 (Note: Renominated on January 9, 2007, after the initial nomination expired.)	March 15, 2007	95–0	April 2, 2007	Incumbent	–
55	Debra Ann Livingston	Second	June 28, 2006	May 9, 2007	91–0	May 17, 2007	July 1, 2026	Incumbent
56	Jennifer Walker Elrod	Fifth	March 29, 2007	October 4, 2007	voice vote	October 19, 2007	Incumbent	–
57	Leslie H. Southwick	Fifth	January 9, 2007 (Note: Originally nominated on June 6, 2006, to the Southern District of Mississippi. The nomination was returned on December 9, 2006. Subsequently nominated to the Fifth Circuit on January 9, 2007.)	October 24, 2007	59–38	October 29, 2007	Incumbent	–
58	John Daniel Tinder	Seventh	July 17, 2007	December 18, 2007	93–0	December 21, 2007	February 18, 2015	October 9, 2015
59	Catharina Haynes	Fifth	July 17, 2007	April 10, 2008	unanimous consent	April 18, 2008	Incumbent	–
60	G. Steven Agee	Fourth	March 13, 2008	May 20, 2008	96–0	July 1, 2008	Incumbent	–
61	Helene White	Sixth	April 15, 2008 (Note: Was previously nominated by President Clinton on January 7, 1997 to a different seat on the same court. That nomination expired at the end of the term. Renominated by President Clinton on January 26, 1999. That nomination expired at the end of the term. Renominated by President Clinton on January 3, 2001. That nomination was withdrawn by President Bush on March 19, 2001. Renominated on April 15, 2008 to a different seat on the same court.)	June 24, 2008	63–32	August 8, 2008	June 13, 2022	Incumbent
62	Raymond Kethledge	Sixth	June 28, 2006 (Note: Renominated on March 19, 2007, after the initial nomination expired.)	June 24, 2008	voice vote	July 7, 2008	Incumbent	–

== District courts ==
#	Judge	Court (Note: See: List of United States district and territorial courts)	Nomination date	Confirmation date	Confirmation vote	Began active service	Ended active service	Ended senior status
1	Richard F. Cebull	D. Mont.	May 17, 2001	July 20, 2001	93–0	July 25, 2001	March 18, 2013	May 3, 2013
2	Sam E. Haddon	D. Mont.	May 17, 2001	July 20, 2001	95–0	July 25, 2001	December 31, 2012	November 26, 2025
3	Reggie B. Walton	D.D.C.	June 20, 2001	September 21, 2001	97–0	September 24, 2001	December 31, 2015	Incumbent
4	Michael P. Mills	N.D. Miss.	July 10, 2001	October 11, 2001	98–0	October 16, 2001	November 1, 2021	Incumbent
5	Claire Eagan	N.D. Okla.	August 2, 2001	October 23, 2001	99–0	October 24, 2001	October 1, 2022	Incumbent
6	Laurie Smith Camp	D. Neb.	June 19, 2001	October 23, 2001	100–0	October 23, 2001	December 1, 2018	September 23, 2020
7	Karen K. Caldwell	E.D. Ky.	August 2, 2001	October 23, 2001	100–0	October 24, 2001	Incumbent	–
8	James H. Payne	E.D. Okla. N.D. Okla. W.D. Okla.	August 2, 2001 (Note: Previously nominated to the same seat on September 17, 1992 by President George H. W. Bush. That nomination expired at the end of the term. Renominated to the same seat upon it becoming vacant again by President George W. Bush on August 2, 2001. Renominated on September 4, 2001.)	October 23, 2001	100–0	October 24, 2001	August 1, 2017	December 2, 2025
9	Larry R. Hicks	D. Nev.	August 2, 2001 (Note: Was previously nominated by President George H. W. Bush on July 2, 1992 to a different seat on the same court. That nomination expired at the end of the term. Renominated by President George W. Bush on August 2, 2001 to a different seat on the same court. Renominated on September 4, 2001.)	November 5, 2001	83–0	November 7, 2001	December 13, 2012	May 29, 2024
10	Stephen P. Friot	W.D. Okla.	August 2, 2001	November 6, 2001	98–0	November 12, 2001	December 1, 2014	Incumbent
11	Karon O. Bowdre	N.D. Ala.	August 2, 2001	November 6, 2001	98–0	November 8, 2001	April 25, 2020	Incumbent
12	Christina Armijo	D.N.M.	August 2, 2001	November 6, 2001	100–0	November 12, 2001	February 7, 2018	Incumbent
13	Terry L. Wooten	D.S.C.	June 18, 2001	November 8, 2001	98–0	November 26, 2001	February 28, 2019	Incumbent
14	Joe L. Heaton	W.D. Okla.	August 2, 2001	December 6, 2001	voice vote	December 10, 2001	July 1, 2019	Incumbent
15	Danny C. Reeves	E.D. Ky.	August 2, 2001	December 6, 2001	voice vote	December 10, 2001	February 1, 2025	Incumbent
16	Julie A. Robinson	D. Kan.	September 10, 2001	December 11, 2001	voice vote	December 13, 2001	January 14, 2022	Incumbent
17	Kurt D. Engelhardt	E.D. La.	August 2, 2001	December 11, 2001	voice vote	December 13, 2001	May 15, 2018	Elevated
18	John D. Bates	D.D.C.	June 20, 2001	December 11, 2001	97–0	December 14, 2001	October 12, 2014	Incumbent
19	Clay D. Land	M.D. Ga.	September 21, 2001	December 13, 2001	voice vote	December 21, 2001	Incumbent	–
20	Frederick J. Martone	D. Ariz.	September 10, 2001	December 13, 2001	97–0	December 21, 2001	January 30, 2013	Incumbent
21	William P. Johnson	D.N.M.	August 2, 2001	December 13, 2001	voice vote	December 21, 2001	January 10, 2025	September 30, 2026
22	C. Ashley Royal	M.D. Ga.	October 9, 2001	December 20, 2001	voice vote	December 21, 2001	September 1, 2016	Incumbent
23	James C. Mahan	D. Nev.	September 10, 2001	January 25, 2002	81–0	January 30, 2002	June 29, 2018	Incumbent
24	Marcia S. Krieger	D. Colo.	September 10, 2001	January 25, 2002	83–0	January 30, 2002	March 3, 2019	Incumbent
25	Callie V. Granade	S.D. Ala.	August 2, 2001	February 4, 2002	75–0	February 12, 2002	March 7, 2016	Incumbent
26	Philip Ray Martinez	W.D. Tex.	October 9, 2001	February 5, 2002	93–0	February 12, 2002	February 26, 2021	–
27	Jay C. Zainey	E.D. La.	October 10, 2001	February 11, 2002	92–0	February 14, 2002	Incumbent	–
28	Richard J. Leon	D.D.C.	September 10, 2001	February 14, 2002	voice vote	February 19, 2002	December 31, 2016	Incumbent
29	James E. Gritzner	S.D. Iowa	July 10, 2001	February 14, 2002	voice vote	February 19, 2002	March 1, 2015	Incumbent
30	David Bunning	E.D. Ky.	August 2, 2001	February 14, 2002	voice vote	February 19, 2002	Incumbent	–
31	Cindy K. Jorgenson	D. Ariz.	September 10, 2001	February 26, 2002	98–0	March 6, 2002	April 6, 2018	Incumbent
32	Robert E. Blackburn	D. Colo.	September 10, 2001	February 26, 2002	98–0	March 6, 2002	April 12, 2016	Incumbent
33	Ralph Beistline	D. Alaska	November 8, 2001	March 12, 2002	98–0	March 19, 2002	December 31, 2015	Incumbent
34	David C. Bury	D. Ariz.	September 10, 2001	March 15, 2002	90–0	March 19, 2002	December 31, 2012	Incumbent
35	Randy Crane	S.D. Tex.	September 21, 2001	March 18, 2002	91–0	March 19, 2002	Incumbent	–
36	Lance Africk	E.D. La.	January 23, 2002	April 17, 2002	97–0	April 17, 2002	October 1, 2024	Incumbent
37	Legrome D. Davis	E.D. Pa.	January 23, 2002 (Note: Was previously nominated by President Clinton on July 30, 1998. That nomination expired at the end of the term. Renominated on January 26, 1999. That nomination expired at the end of the term. Renominated on January 23, 2002 by President Bush.)	April 18, 2002	94–0	April 23, 2002	September 28, 2017	Incumbent
38	John F. Walter	C.D. Cal.	January 23, 2002 (Note: Previously nominated by George H. W. Bush to a different seat on the same court on March 20, 1992. The nomination expired at the end of the term. Subsequently renominated to a different seat on the same court by George W. Bush on January 23, 2002.)	April 25, 2002	99–0	May 1, 2002	Incumbent	–
39	William C. Griesbach	E.D. Wis.	January 23, 2002	April 25, 2002	97–0	May 1, 2002	December 31, 2019	Incumbent
40	Joan N. Ericksen	D. Minn.	January 23, 2002	April 25, 2002	99–0	May 1, 2002	October 15, 2019	Incumbent
41	Percy Anderson	C.D. Cal.	January 23, 2002	April 25, 2002	99–0	May 1, 2002	Incumbent	–
42	Cynthia M. Rufe	E.D. Pa.	January 23, 2002	April 30, 2002	98–0	May 3, 2002	December 31, 2021	Incumbent
43	Michael Baylson	E.D. Pa.	January 23, 2002	April 30, 2002	98–0	June 19, 2002	July 13, 2012	Incumbent
44	Andrew Hanen	S.D. Tex.	January 23, 2002	May 9, 2002	97–0	May 10, 2002	January 2, 2025	Incumbent
45	Leonard Davis	E.D. Tex.	January 23, 2002 (Note: Was previously nominated by President George H. W. Bush to a different seat on the same court on June 3, 1992. That nomination expired at the end of the term. Renominated by President George W. Bush on January 23, 2002 to a different seat on the same court.)	May 9, 2002	97–0	May 10, 2002	May 15, 2015	–
46	Samuel H. Mays Jr.	W.D. Tenn.	January 23, 2002	May 9, 2002	97–0	May 10, 2002	July 1, 2015	Incumbent
47	Thomas M. Rose	S.D. Ohio	January 23, 2002	May 9, 2002	95–0	May 10, 2002	June 30, 2017	Incumbent
48	Paul G. Cassell	D. Utah	June 19, 2001	May 13, 2002	67–20	May 15, 2002	November 5, 2007	–
49	Christopher C. Conner	M.D. Pa.	February 28, 2002	July 26, 2002	voice vote	July 29, 2002	January 17, 2025	–
50	John E. Jones III	M.D. Pa.	February 28, 2002	July 29, 2002	96–0	July 31, 2002	August 1, 2021	–
51	Joy Flowers Conti	W.D. Pa.	January 23, 2002	July 29, 2002	96–0	July 31, 2002	December 6, 2018	Incumbent
52	Timothy J. Savage	E.D. Pa.	March 21, 2002	August 1, 2002	voice vote	August 1, 2002	March 1, 2021	Incumbent
53	David S. Cercone	W.D. Pa.	March 21, 2002 (Note: Was previously nominated by President Clinton to a different seat on the same court on July 27, 2000. That nomination expired at the end of the term. Renominated by President Bush on March 21, 2002 to a different seat on the same court.)	August 1, 2002	voice vote	August 2, 2002	November 24, 2017	Incumbent
54	Richard Everett Dorr	W.D. Mo.	March 21, 2002 (Note: Was previously nominated by President George H. W. Bush to a different seat on the same court on September 9, 1992. That nomination expired at the end of the term. Renominated by President George W. Bush on March 21, 2002 to a different seat on the same court.)	August 1, 2002	voice vote	August 2, 2002	April 24, 2013	–
55	Henry Autrey	E.D. Mo.	March 21, 2002	August 1, 2002	98–0	August 2, 2002	Incumbent	–
56	Amy St. Eve	N.D. Ill.	March 21, 2002	August 1, 2002	voice vote	August 2, 2002	May 23, 2018	Elevated
57	Morrison C. England Jr.	E.D. Cal.	March 21, 2002	August 1, 2002	voice vote	August 2, 2002	December 17, 2019	October 4, 2024
58	Henry E. Hudson	E.D. Va.	January 23, 2002	August 1, 2002	voice vote	August 2, 2002	June 1, 2018	Incumbent
59	David C. Godbey	N.D. Tex.	January 23, 2002	August 1, 2002	voice vote	August 2, 2002	September 17, 2025	Incumbent
60	Terrence F. McVerry	W.D. Pa.	January 23, 2002	September 3, 2002	88–0	September 4, 2002	September 30, 2013	March 8, 2021
61	Kenneth Marra	S.D. Fla.	January 23, 2002	September 9, 2002	82–0	September 13, 2002	August 1, 2017	Incumbent
62	Timothy J. Corrigan	M.D. Fla.	May 22, 2002	September 13, 2002	88–0	September 13, 2002	November 2, 2024	Incumbent
63	Arthur J. Schwab	W.D. Pa.	January 23, 2002	September 13, 2002	92–0	September 17, 2002	January 1, 2018	Incumbent
64	Jose E. Martinez	S.D. Fla.	January 23, 2002	September 13, 2002	voice vote	September 17, 2002	Incumbent	–
65	James Knoll Gardner	E.D. Pa.	April 22, 2002	October 2, 2002	voice vote	October 3, 2002	April 3, 2017	April 26, 2017
66	Ron Clark	E.D. Tex.	January 23, 2002	October 2, 2002	voice vote	October 10, 2002	February 28, 2018	Incumbent
67	Freda L. Wolfson	D.N.J.	August 1, 2002	November 14, 2002	voice vote	December 4, 2002	February 1, 2023	–
68	Jose L. Linares	D.N.J.	August 1, 2002	November 14, 2002	voice vote	December 3, 2002	May 16, 2019	–
69	Robert B. Kugler	D.N.J.	August 1, 2002	November 14, 2002	voice vote	December 4, 2002	November 2, 2018	May 31, 2024
70	Rosemary M. Collyer	D.D.C.	August 1, 2002	November 14, 2002	voice vote	November 15, 2002	May 18, 2016	June 7, 2026
71	Mark E. Fuller	M.D. Ala.	August 1, 2002	November 14, 2002	voice vote	November 26, 2002	August 1, 2015	–
72	Kent A. Jordan	D. Del.	July 25, 2002	November 14, 2002	voice vote	November 15, 2002	December 15, 2006	Elevated
73	Jeffrey S. White	N.D. Cal.	July 25, 2002	November 14, 2002	voice vote	November 15, 2002	February 1, 2021	Incumbent
74	William E. Smith	D.R.I.	July 18, 2002	November 14, 2002	voice vote	November 15, 2002	January 1, 2025	January 21, 2026
75	James E. Kinkeade	N.D. Tex.	July 18, 2002	November 14, 2002	voice vote	November 15, 2002	Incumbent	–
76	R. Gary Klausner	C.D. Cal.	July 18, 2002	November 14, 2002	voice vote	November 15, 2002	Incumbent	–
77	Alia Moses	W.D. Tex.	July 11, 2002	November 14, 2002	voice vote	November 15, 2002	Incumbent	–
78	Linda R. Reade	N.D. Iowa	June 26, 2002	November 14, 2002	voice vote	November 26, 2002	October 1, 2017	Incumbent
79	Thomas W. Phillips	E.D. Tenn.	June 26, 2002	November 14, 2002	voice vote	November 15, 2002	August 1, 2013	Incumbent
80	Daniel L. Hovland	D.N.D.	June 26, 2002	November 14, 2002	voice vote	November 26, 2002	November 10, 2019	Incumbent
81	Ronald B. Leighton	W.D. Wash.	January 23, 2002 (Note: Was previously nominated by President George H. W. Bush to a different seat on the same court on April 30, 1992. That nomination expired at the end of the term. Renominated by President George W. Bush on January 23, 2002 to a different seat on the same court.)	November 14, 2002	voice vote	November 26, 2002	February 28, 2019	August 31, 2020
82	Bill Martini	D.N.J.	January 23, 2002	November 14, 2002	voice vote	November 19, 2002	February 10, 2015	Incumbent
83	Stanley R. Chesler	D.N.J.	January 23, 2002	November 14, 2002	voice vote	December 4, 2002	June 15, 2015	Incumbent
84	S. James Otero	C.D. Cal.	July 18, 2002	February 10, 2003	94–0	February 12, 2003	December 30, 2018	April 10, 2020
85	Robert A. Junell	W.D. Tex.	July 18, 2002	February 10, 2003	91–0	February 12, 2003	February 13, 2015	November 1, 2025
86	John R. Adams	N.D. Ohio	October 10, 2002	February 10, 2003	91–0	February 12, 2003	Incumbent	–
87	Gregory L. Frost	S.D. Ohio	August 1, 2002	March 10, 2003	91–0	March 11, 2003	May 2, 2016	–
88	William D. Quarles Jr.	D. Md.	September 12, 2002 (Note: Was previously nominated by President George H. W. Bush on June 2, 1992 to a different seat on the same court. That nomination expired at the end of the term. Renominated by President George W. Bush on September 12, 2002 to a different seat on the same court. That nomination expired at the end of the term. Renominated on January 7, 2003.)	March 12, 2003	91–0	March 14, 2003	February 1, 2016	–
89	Ralph R. Erickson	D.N.D.	September 12, 2002	March 12, 2003	unanimous consent	March 14, 2003	October 13, 2017	Elevated
90	William H. Steele	S.D. Ala.	January 7, 2003 (Note: Originally nominated on October 9, 2001 to the Court of Appeals for the Eleventh Circuit. That nomination expired at the end of the term. Nominated to the Southern District of Alabama on January 7, 2003.)	March 13, 2003	voice vote	March 14, 2003	June 8, 2017	Incumbent
91	Thomas A. Varlan	E.D. Tenn.	October 10, 2002	March 13, 2003	97–0	March 14, 2003	October 5, 2026	Incumbent
92	J. Daniel Breen	W.D. Tenn.	October 10, 2002	March 13, 2003	92–0	March 14, 2003	March 18, 2017	Incumbent
93	Philip P. Simon	N.D. Ind.	January 29, 2003	March 27, 2003	voice vote	March 27, 2003	Incumbent	–
94	James V. Selna	C.D. Cal.	January 29, 2003	March 27, 2003	97–0	March 27, 2003	March 3, 2020	Incumbent
95	Theresa Springmann	N.D. Ind.	January 29, 2003	March 31, 2003	93–0	June 24, 2003	January 23, 2021	Incumbent
96	Cormac J. Carney	C.D. Cal.	October 10, 2002	April 7, 2003	99–0	April 9, 2003	May 31, 2024	Incumbent
97	Richard D. Bennett	D. Md.	January 29, 2003	April 9, 2003	99–0	April 10, 2003	June 30, 2021	Incumbent
98	Dee D. Drell	W.D. La.	January 15, 2003	April 9, 2003	99–0	April 10, 2003	November 30, 2017	Incumbent
99	Cecilia Altonaga	S.D. Fla.	January 15, 2003	May 6, 2003	91–0	May 7, 2003	Incumbent	–
100	Patricia Head Minaldi	W.D. La.	January 15, 2003	May 6, 2003	voice vote	May 9, 2003	July 31, 2017	December 1, 2018
101	S. Maurice Hicks Jr.	W.D. La.	September 12, 2002	May 19, 2003	86–0	May 21, 2003	Incumbent	–
102	L. Scott Coogler	N.D. Ala.	March 27, 2003	May 22, 2003	voice vote	May 28, 2003	January 2, 2025	–
103	J. Ronnie Greer	E.D. Tenn.	April 9, 2003	June 11, 2003	97–0	June 12, 2003	June 30, 2018	Incumbent
104	Mark R. Kravitz	D. Conn.	March 27, 2003	June 11, 2003	97–0	June 12, 2003	September 30, 2012	–
105	John A. Woodcock Jr.	D. Me.	March 27, 2003	June 12, 2003	voice vote	June 16, 2003	June 27, 2017	Incumbent
106	David G. Campbell	D. Ariz.	March 13, 2003	July 8, 2003	92–0	July 15, 2003	July 31, 2018	Incumbent
107	Robert C. Brack	D.N.M.	April 28, 2003	July 14, 2003	voice vote	July 15, 2003	July 25, 2018	Incumbent
108	Samuel Der-Yeghiayan	N.D. Ill.	March 5, 2003	July 14, 2003	89–0	July 15, 2003	February 17, 2018	–
109	Lonny R. Suko	E.D. Wash.	April 28, 2003	July 15, 2003	94–0	July 16, 2003	November 1, 2013	Incumbent
110	Louise Flanagan	E.D.N.C.	January 29, 2003	July 17, 2003	voice vote	July 18, 2003	Incumbent	–
111	Earl Leroy Yeakel III	W.D. Tex.	May 1, 2003	July 28, 2003	91–0	July 29, 2003	May 1, 2023	–
112	Kathleen Cardone	W.D. Tex.	May 1, 2003	July 28, 2003	voice vote	July 29, 2003	Incumbent	–
113	Xavier Rodriguez	W.D. Tex.	May 1, 2003	July 31, 2003	voice vote	August 1, 2003	Incumbent	–
114	Frank Montalvo	W.D. Tex.	May 1, 2003	July 31, 2003	95–0	August 1, 2003	December 1, 2022	Incumbent
115	James I. Cohn	S.D. Fla.	May 1, 2003	July 31, 2003	96–0	August 1, 2003	August 5, 2016	Incumbent
116	Harold Brent McKnight	W.D.N.C.	April 28, 2003	July 31, 2003	voice vote	August 1, 2003	November 27, 2004	–
117	James O. Browning	D.N.M.	April 28, 2003	July 31, 2003	voice vote	August 1, 2003	February 1, 2026	August 28, 2026
118	R. David Proctor	N.D. Ala.	May 1, 2003	September 17, 2003	92–0	September 22, 2003	January 1, 2026	July 1, 2026
119	P. Kevin Castel	S.D.N.Y.	March 5, 2003	September 17, 2003	voice vote	September 22, 2003	August 5, 2017	Incumbent
120	Stephen C. Robinson	S.D.N.Y.	March 5, 2003	September 17, 2003	voice vote	September 22, 2003	August 11, 2010	–
121	Richard J. Holwell	S.D.N.Y.	August 1, 2002	September 17, 2003	voice vote	September 22, 2003	February 7, 2012	–
122	Sandra J. Feuerstein	E.D.N.Y.	July 25, 2002	September 17, 2003	92–0	September 22, 2003	January 21, 2015	April 9, 2021
123	Henry F. Floyd	D.S.C.	May 15, 2003	September 22, 2003	89–0	September 24, 2003	October 6, 2011	Elevated
124	Glen E. Conrad	W.D. Va.	April 28, 2003	September 22, 2003	89–0	September 24, 2003	December 11, 2017	May 20, 2021
125	Kim R. Gibson	W.D. Pa.	April 28, 2003	September 23, 2003	94–0	September 24, 2003	June 3, 2016	May 30, 2025
126	Larry Alan Burns	S.D. Cal.	May 1, 2003	September 24, 2003	91–0	September 25, 2003	January 22, 2021	May 1, 2024
127	Michael W. Mosman	D. Ore.	May 8, 2003	September 25, 2003	93–0	September 26, 2003	December 27, 2021	Incumbent
128	Dana Sabraw	S.D. Cal.	May 1, 2003	September 25, 2003	95–0	September 26, 2003	Incumbent	–
129	Ronald A. White	E.D. Okla.	May 15, 2003	September 30, 2003	93–0	October 2, 2003	January 27, 2026	Incumbent
130	Marcia A. Crone	E.D. Tex.	May 1, 2003	September 30, 2003	91–0	October 3, 2003	Incumbent	–
131	Phillip S. Figa	D. Colo.	June 9, 2003	October 2, 2003	voice vote	October 6, 2003	January 5, 2008	–
132	Robert Clive Jones	D. Nev.	June 9, 2003	October 2, 2003	voice vote	November 30, 2003	February 1, 2016	Incumbent
133	John A. Houston	S.D. Cal.	May 1, 2003	October 2, 2003	voice vote	October 7, 2003	February 6, 2018	Incumbent
134	William Q. Hayes	S.D. Cal.	May 1, 2003	October 2, 2003	98–0	October 6, 2003	August 1, 2021	Incumbent
135	M. Casey Rodgers	N.D. Fla.	July 14, 2003	October 20, 2003	82–0	November 21, 2003	Incumbent	–
136	Thomas Hardiman	W.D. Pa.	April 9, 2003	October 22, 2003	voice vote	October 27, 2003	April 5, 2007	Elevated
137	Dale S. Fischer	C.D. Cal.	May 1, 2003	October 27, 2003	86–0	November 5, 2003	May 1, 2024	Incumbent
138	Roger W. Titus	D. Md.	June 18, 2003	November 5, 2003	97–0	November 6, 2003	January 17, 2014	March 3, 2019
139	Gary L. Sharpe	N.D.N.Y.	April 28, 2003	January 28, 2004	95–0	January 29, 2004	January 1, 2016	February 12, 2024
140	Mark Filip	N.D. Ill.	April 28, 2003	February 5, 2004	96–0	February 8, 2004	March 9, 2008	–
141	Neil V. Wake	D. Ariz.	October 22, 2003	March 12, 2004	voice vote	March 15, 2004	July 5, 2016	May 26, 2026
142	Louis Guirola Jr.	S.D. Miss.	September 23, 2003	March 12, 2004	92–0	March 22, 2004	March 23, 2018	Incumbent
143	Marcia G. Cooke	S.D. Fla.	November 25, 2003	May 18, 2004	96–0	May 18, 2004	July 15, 2022	January 27, 2023
144	F. Dennis Saylor IV	D. Mass.	July 30, 2003	June 1, 2004	89–0	June 2, 2004	July 31, 2025	Incumbent
145	Judith C. Herrera	D.N.M.	September 23, 2003	June 3, 2004	93–0	June 13, 2004	July 1, 2019	Incumbent
146	Kenneth M. Karas	S.D.N.Y.	September 18, 2003	June 3, 2004	95–0	June 13, 2004	Incumbent	–
147	Sandra L. Townes	E.D.N.Y.	August 1, 2003	June 3, 2004	95–0	August 2, 2004	May 1, 2015	February 8, 2018
148	Gene E. K. Pratter	E.D. Pa.	November 3, 2003	June 15, 2004	98–0	June 16, 2004	May 17, 2024	–
149	Ricardo S. Martinez	W.D. Wash.	October 14, 2003	June 15, 2004	98–0	June 16, 2004	September 5, 2022	Incumbent
150	Virginia Emerson Hopkins	N.D. Ala.	October 14, 2003	June 15, 2004	98–0	June 17, 2004	June 22, 2018	Incumbent
151	Paul S. Diamond	E.D. Pa.	January 20, 2004	June 16, 2004	97–0	June 22, 2004	Incumbent	–
152	Lawrence F. Stengel	E.D. Pa.	November 6, 2003	June 16, 2004	97–0	June 21, 2004	August 31, 2018	–
153	William S. Duffey Jr.	N.D. Ga.	November 5, 2003	June 16, 2004	97–0	July 1, 2004	July 1, 2018	–
154	James Robart	W.D. Wash.	December 9, 2003	June 17, 2004	99–0	June 21, 2004	June 28, 2016	Incumbent
155	Jane J. Boyle	N.D. Tex.	November 24, 2003	June 17, 2004	99–0	June 29, 2004	October 1, 2025	Incumbent
156	Roger Benitez	S.D. Cal.	May 1, 2003	June 17, 2004	98–1	June 21, 2004	December 31, 2017	April 2, 2026
157	Juan Ramon Sánchez	E.D. Pa.	November 25, 2003	June 23, 2004	98–0	June 24, 2004	Incumbent	–
158	Walter D. Kelley Jr.	E.D. Va.	October 31, 2003	June 23, 2004	94–0	August 16, 2004	May 16, 2008	–
159	George P. Schiavelli	C.D. Cal.	January 20, 2004	June 24, 2004	voice vote	July 8, 2004	October 5, 2008	–
160	Robert Bryan Harwell	D.S.C.	January 20, 2004	June 24, 2004	voice vote	June 30, 2004	June 4, 2024	Incumbent
161	Dora Irizarry	E.D.N.Y.	April 28, 2003	June 24, 2004	voice vote	July 8, 2004	January 26, 2020	Incumbent
162	James Leon Holmes	E.D. Ark.	January 29, 2003	July 6, 2004	51–46	July 7, 2004	March 31, 2018	February 5, 2020
163	Michael H. Schneider Sr.	E.D. Tex.	May 17, 2004	September 7, 2004	92–1	September 10, 2004	January 7, 2016	October 1, 2016
164	Virginia Covington	M.D. Fla.	April 20, 2004	September 7, 2004	91–0	September 10, 2004	July 12, 2020	Incumbent
165	Michael H. Watson	S.D. Ohio	April 6, 2004	September 7, 2004	voice vote	September 10, 2004	November 1, 2025	Incumbent
166	Christopher A. Boyko	N.D. Ohio	July 22, 2004	November 21, 2004	voice vote	January 3, 2005	January 6, 2020	Incumbent
167	Keith Starrett	S.D. Miss.	July 6, 2004	November 21, 2004	voice vote	December 13, 2004	April 30, 2019	Incumbent
168	Micaela Alvarez	S.D. Tex.	June 16, 2004	November 21, 2004	voice vote	December 13, 2004	June 8, 2023	Incumbent
169	Paul A. Crotty	S.D.N.Y.	September 7, 2004	April 11, 2005	95–0	April 15, 2005	August 1, 2015	Incumbent
170	John Michael Seabright	D. Haw.	September 15, 2004	April 27, 2005	98–0	April 28, 2005	January 30, 2024	Incumbent
171	Robert J. Conrad	W.D.N.C.	April 28, 2003	April 28, 2005	voice vote	June 2, 2005	May 17, 2023	February 28, 2025
172	James C. Dever III	E.D.N.C.	May 22, 2002	April 28, 2005	voice vote	May 2, 2005	Incumbent	–
173	Harry Sandlin Mattice Jr.	E.D. Tenn.	July 28, 2005	October 24, 2005	91–0	November 18, 2005	March 10, 2020	September 30, 2021
174	Brian E. Sandoval	D. Nev.	March 1, 2005	October 24, 2005	89–0	October 26, 2005	September 15, 2009	–
175	John Richard Smoak Jr.	N.D. Fla.	June 8, 2005	October 27, 2005	97–0	November 3, 2005	December 31, 2015	May 2, 2022
176	Eric N. Vitaliano	E.D.N.Y.	October 6, 2005	December 21, 2005	voice vote	January 19, 2006	February 28, 2017	Incumbent
177	William Keith Watkins	M.D. Ala.	September 28, 2005	December 21, 2005	voice vote	December 27, 2005	January 31, 2019	Incumbent
178	Virginia Mary Kendall	N.D. Ill.	September 28, 2005	December 21, 2005	voice vote	January 3, 2006	Incumbent	–
179	Kristi DuBose	S.D. Ala.	September 28, 2005	December 21, 2005	voice vote	December 27, 2005	Incumbent	–
180	Gregory Van Tatenhove	E.D. Ky.	September 13, 2005	December 21, 2005	voice vote	January 5, 2006	July 19, 2026	–
181	Joseph F. Bianco	E.D.N.Y.	July 28, 2005	December 21, 2005	voice vote	January 3, 2006	May 17, 2019	Elevated
182	Timothy M. Burgess	D. Alaska	July 28, 2005	December 21, 2005	voice vote	January 23, 2006	December 31, 2021	Incumbent
183	Timothy Batten	N.D. Ga.	September 28, 2005	March 6, 2006	88–0	March 28, 2006	May 23, 2025	–
184	Thomas E. Johnston	S.D.W.Va.	September 28, 2005	March 6, 2006	89–0	April 17, 2006	Incumbent	–
185	Aida Delgado-Colón	D.P.R.	October 25, 2005	March 6, 2006	voice vote	March 17, 2006	Incumbent	–
186	Stephen G. Larson	C.D. Cal.	December 15, 2005	March 16, 2006	voice vote	March 20, 2006	November 2, 2009	–
187	Jack Zouhary	N.D. Ohio	December 14, 2005	March 16, 2006	96–0	March 28, 2006	July 1, 2019	Incumbent
188	Gray H. Miller	S.D. Tex.	January 25, 2006	April 25, 2006	93–0	April 25, 2006	December 9, 2018	Incumbent
189	Patrick J. Schiltz	D. Minn.	December 14, 2005	April 26, 2006	voice vote	April 28, 2006	July 1, 2026	Incumbent
190	Michael R. Barrett	S.D. Ohio	November 10, 2005	May 1, 2006	90–0	May 5, 2006	February 15, 2019	Incumbent
191	Brian Cogan	E.D.N.Y.	January 25, 2006	May 4, 2006	95–0	June 7, 2006	June 12, 2020	Incumbent
192	Thomas M. Golden	E.D. Pa.	January 25, 2006	May 4, 2006	96–0	June 13, 2006	July 31, 2010	–
193	Susan D. Wigenton	D.N.J.	January 25, 2006	May 26, 2006	voice vote	June 12, 2006	Incumbent	–
194	Renée Marie Bumb	D.N.J.	January 25, 2006	June 6, 2006	89–0	June 12, 2006	Incumbent	–
195	Noel Lawrence Hillman	D.N.J.	January 25, 2006	June 8, 2006	98–0	June 12, 2006	April 4, 2022	February 29, 2024
196	Peter G. Sheridan	D.N.J.	November 5, 2003	June 8, 2006	98–0	June 12, 2006	June 14, 2018	Incumbent
197	Sean F. Cox	E.D. Mich.	September 10, 2004	June 8, 2006	voice vote	June 12, 2006	July 28, 2025	–
198	Thomas Lamson Ludington	E.D. Mich.	September 12, 2002	June 8, 2006	voice vote	June 12, 2006	Incumbent	–
199	Andrew J. Guilford	C.D. Cal.	January 25, 2006	June 22, 2006	93–0	June 26, 2006	July 5, 2019	January 31, 2020
200	Frank DeArmon Whitney	W.D.N.C.	February 14, 2006	June 22, 2006	voice vote	July 5, 2006	December 1, 2024	Incumbent
201	Daniel P. Jordan III	S.D. Miss.	April 24, 2006	July 20, 2006	voice vote	August 7, 2006	Incumbent	–
202	Gustavo Gelpí	D.P.R.	April 24, 2006	July 20, 2006	voice vote	August 1, 2006	October 20, 2021	Elevated
203	Francisco Besosa	D.P.R.	May 16, 2006	September 25, 2006	87–0	September 27, 2006	January 1, 2022	Incumbent
204	Lisa Godbey Wood	S.D. Ga.	June 12, 2006	January 30, 2007	97–0	February 8, 2007	Incumbent	–
205	Philip S. Gutierrez	C.D. Cal.	April 24, 2006	January 30, 2007	97–0	February 16, 2007	October 22, 2024	–
206	Lawrence Joseph O'Neill	E.D. Cal.	August 2, 2006	February 1, 2007	97–0	February 2, 2007	February 2, 2020	Incumbent
207	Gregory Kent Frizzell	N.D. Okla.	June 7, 2006	February 1, 2007	99–0	February 2, 2007	March 1, 2025	Incumbent
208	Valerie Baker Fairbank	C.D. Cal.	May 4, 2006	February 1, 2007	voice vote	February 16, 2007	March 1, 2012	Incumbent
209	Nora Barry Fischer	W.D. Pa.	July 13, 2006	February 14, 2007	96–0	April 2, 2007	June 13, 2019	Incumbent
210	Marcia Morales Howard	M.D. Fla.	June 6, 2006	February 15, 2007	93–0	February 20, 2007	Incumbent	–
211	Sara Elizabeth Lioi	N.D. Ohio	July 13, 2006	March 8, 2007	voice vote	March 14, 2007	Incumbent	–
212	John Alfred Jarvey	S.D. Iowa	June 28, 2006	March 8, 2007	95–0	March 14, 2007	March 18, 2022	–
213	Otis D. Wright II	C.D. Cal.	September 5, 2006	March 15, 2007	voice vote	April 16, 2007	Incumbent	–
214	John P. Bailey	N.D.W.Va.	June 28, 2006	March 15, 2007	voice vote	March 19, 2007	Incumbent	–
215	George H. Wu	C.D. Cal.	September 5, 2006	March 27, 2007	95–0	April 17, 2007	November 3, 2023	Incumbent
216	Vanessa Lynne Bryant	D. Conn.	January 25, 2006	March 28, 2007	voice vote	April 2, 2007	February 1, 2021	Incumbent
217	Halil Suleyman Ozerden	S.D. Miss.	September 5, 2006	April 24, 2007	95–0	May 1, 2007	Incumbent	–
218	Frederick J. Kapala	N.D. Ill.	December 5, 2006	May 8, 2007	91–0	May 10, 2007	May 10, 2019	Incumbent
219	Richard J. Sullivan	S.D.N.Y.	February 15, 2007	June 28, 2007	99–0	August 1, 2007	October 25, 2018	Elevated
220	Benjamin Settle	W.D. Wash.	November 15, 2006	June 28, 2007	99–0	July 2, 2007	January 1, 2020	Incumbent
221	Joseph S. Van Bokkelen	N.D. Ind.	January 9, 2007	June 28, 2007	voice vote	July 18, 2007	September 29, 2017	Incumbent
222	Liam O'Grady	E.D. Va.	August 2, 2006	July 9, 2007	88–0	July 11, 2007	May 1, 2020	August 18, 2023
223	Janet T. Neff	W.D. Mich.	June 28, 2006	July 9, 2007	83–4	August 6, 2007	March 1, 2021	Incumbent
224	Paul Lewis Maloney	W.D. Mich.	June 28, 2006	July 9, 2007	voice vote	July 13, 2007	Incumbent	–
225	Robert James Jonker	W.D. Mich.	June 28, 2006	July 9, 2007	voice vote	July 16, 2007	Incumbent	–
226	Timothy D. DeGiusti	W.D. Okla.	February 15, 2007	August 3, 2007	96–0	August 9, 2007	Incumbent	–
227	William Lindsay Osteen Jr.	M.D.N.C.	September 29, 2006	September 10, 2007	86–0	September 19, 2007	Incumbent	–
228	Martin Karl Reidinger	W.D.N.C.	September 29, 2006	September 10, 2007	voice vote	September 12, 2007	Incumbent	–
229	Janis Lynn Sammartino	S.D. Cal.	March 19, 2007	September 10, 2007	90–0	September 21, 2007	Incumbent	–
230	Roslynn R. Mauskopf	E.D.N.Y.	August 2, 2006	October 4, 2007	voice vote	October 18, 2007	January 31, 2024	–
231	Richard A. Jones	W.D. Wash.	March 19, 2007	October 4, 2007	voice vote	October 29, 2007	September 5, 2022	Incumbent
232	Sharion Aycock	N.D. Miss.	March 19, 2007	October 4, 2007	voice vote	October 22, 2007	April 15, 2025	Incumbent
233	Robert Michael Dow Jr.	N.D. Ill.	July 18, 2007	November 13, 2007	86–0	December 5, 2007	Incumbent	–
234	Reed O'Connor	N.D. Tex.	June 27, 2007	November 16, 2007	voice vote	November 21, 2007	Incumbent	–
235	Amul Thapar	E.D. Ky.	May 24, 2007	December 13, 2007	voice vote	January 4, 2008	May 30, 2017	Elevated
236	Joseph Normand Laplante	D.N.H.	June 13, 2007	December 14, 2007	voice vote	December 28, 2007	Incumbent	–
237	Thomas D. Schroeder	M.D.N.C.	September 29, 2006	December 14, 2007	voice vote	January 8, 2008	Incumbent	–
238	Brian S. Miller	E.D. Ark.	October 16, 2007	April 10, 2008	88–0	April 17, 2008	Incumbent	–
239	James Randal Hall	S.D. Ga.	March 19, 2007	April 10, 2008	voice vote	April 29, 2008	Incumbent	–
240	John Mendez	E.D. Cal.	September 6, 2007	April 10, 2008	voice vote	April 17, 2008	April 17, 2022	Incumbent
241	S. Thomas Anderson	W.D. Tenn.	September 6, 2007	April 10, 2008	voice vote	May 21, 2008	Incumbent	–
242	Mark Steven Davis	E.D. Va.	November 15, 2007	June 10, 2008	94–0	June 23, 2008	Incumbent	–
243	David Gregory Kays	W.D. Mo.	November 15, 2007	June 10, 2008	voice vote	June 19, 2008	Incumbent	–
244	Stephen N. Limbaugh Jr.	E.D. Mo.	December 6, 2007	June 10, 2008	voice vote	August 1, 2008	August 1, 2020	Incumbent
245	Stephen Murphy III	E.D. Mich.	April 15, 2008 (Note: Originally nominated on June 28, 2006, to the Court of Appeals for the Sixth Circuit. Renominated on March 19, 2007. Nomination subsequently withdrawn on April 15, 2008 and nominated to the Eastern District of Michigan on the same day.)	June 24, 2008	voice vote	August 18, 2008	Incumbent	–
246	William T. Lawrence	S.D. Ind.	February 14, 2008	June 26, 2008	97–0	June 30, 2008	July 1, 2018	Incumbent
247	G. Murray Snow	D. Ariz.	December 11, 2007	June 26, 2008	voice vote	July 23, 2008	October 21, 2024	Incumbent
248	Paul G. Gardephe	S.D.N.Y.	April 29, 2008	July 17, 2008	voice vote	August 8, 2008	August 9, 2023	Incumbent
249	Kiyo A. Matsumoto	E.D.N.Y.	March 11, 2008	July 17, 2008	voice vote	July 22, 2008	July 23, 2022	Incumbent
250	Glenn T. Suddaby	N.D.N.Y.	December 11, 2007	July 22, 2008	voice vote	August 29, 2008	September 1, 2024	Incumbent
251	Cathy Seibel	S.D.N.Y.	March 11, 2008	July 22, 2008	voice vote	July 30, 2008	November 3, 2025	Incumbent
252	Clark Waddoups	D. Utah	April 29, 2008	September 26, 2008	unanimous consent	October 21, 2008	January 31, 2019	Incumbent
253	Michael Anello	S.D. Cal.	April 23, 2008	September 26, 2008	unanimous consent	October 10, 2008	October 31, 2018	Incumbent
254	Mary Stenson Scriven	M.D. Fla.	July 10, 2008	September 26, 2008	unanimous consent	September 30, 2008	Incumbent	–
255	Christine Arguello	D. Colo.	July 10, 2008	September 26, 2008	unanimous consent	October 21, 2008	July 15, 2022	Incumbent
256	Philip A. Brimmer	D. Colo.	July 10, 2008	September 26, 2008	unanimous consent	October 14, 2008	Incumbent	–
257	Anthony Trenga	E.D. Va.	July 17, 2008	September 26, 2008	unanimous consent	October 14, 2008	June 1, 2021	Incumbent
258	C. Darnell Jones II	E.D. Pa.	July 24, 2008	September 26, 2008	unanimous consent	October 30, 2008	March 15, 2021	Incumbent
259	Mitchell S. Goldberg	E.D. Pa.	July 24, 2008	September 26, 2008	unanimous consent	October 31, 2008	September 19, 2025	–
260	Joel Harvey Slomsky	E.D. Pa.	July 24, 2008	September 26, 2008	unanimous consent	October 6, 2008	October 9, 2018	Incumbent
261	Eric F. Melgren	D. Kan.	July 23, 2008	September 26, 2008	unanimous consent	October 6, 2008	September 1, 2025	Incumbent

== United States Court of International Trade ==
#	Judge	Nomination date	Confirmation date	Confirmation vote	Began active service	Ended active service	Ended senior status
1	Timothy C. Stanceu	December 19, 2001	March 6, 2003	voice vote	March 10, 2003	April 5, 2021	Incumbent
2	Leo M. Gordon	November 10, 2005	March 13, 2006	82–0	March 16, 2006	March 22, 2019	Incumbent

== Specialty courts (Article I) ==
=== United States Court of Federal Claims ===
#	Judge	Nomination date	Confirmation date	Confirmation vote	Began active service	Ended active service	Ended senior status
1	Lawrence J. Block	August 2, 2001	October 2, 2002	voice vote	October 3, 2002	January 8, 2016	–
2	Marian Blank Horn	August 1, 2001	March 3, 2003	89–0	March 10, 2003	March 9, 2018	Incumbent
3	Victor J. Wolski	September 12, 2002	July 9, 2003	54–43	July 14, 2003	July 13, 2018	Incumbent
4	Mary Ellen Coster Williams	June 21, 2001	July 9, 2003	voice vote	July 14, 2003	July 13, 2018	Incumbent
5	Susan G. Braden	May 1, 2002	July 9, 2003	voice vote	July 14, 2003	July 13, 2018	April 1, 2019
6	Charles F. Lettow	August 1, 2001	July 9, 2003	voice vote	July 14, 2003	July 13, 2018	December 24, 2024
7	George W. Miller	July 30, 2003	December 9, 2003	voice vote	December 13, 2003	August 7, 2013	–
8	Thomas C. Wheeler	June 14, 2006	October 21, 2006	voice vote	October 24, 2006	October 23, 2020	–
9	Margaret M. Sweeney	June 14, 2006	October 21, 2006	voice vote	October 24, 2005	October 23, 2020	Incumbent

=== United States Court of Appeals for Veterans Claims ===
#	Judge	Nomination date	Confirmation date	Confirmation vote	Began active service	Ended active service	Ended senior status
1	Bruce E. Kasold	March 21, 2002	December 9, 2003	voice vote	December 31, 2003	December 2016	Incumbent
2	Lawrence B. Hagel	February 14, 2003	December 9, 2003	voice vote	December 31, 2003	October 8, 2016	Incumbent
3	Alan Lance	September 24, 2002	November 20, 2004	voice vote	December 4, 2004	April 30, 2017	Incumbent
4	Robert N. Davis	March 26, 2003	November 20, 2004	voice vote	December 4, 2004	December 3, 2019	Incumbent
5	Mary J. Schoelen	March 12, 2004	November 20, 2004	voice vote	December 4, 2004	December 3, 2019	Incumbent
6	William A. Moorman	September 21, 2004	November 20, 2004	voice vote	December 4, 2004	August 31, 2015	Incumbent

=== United States Court of Appeals for the Armed Forces ===
#	Judge	Nomination date	Confirmation date	Confirmation vote	Began active service	Ended active service	Ended senior status
1	Charles E. Erdmann	August 1, 2002	October 2, 2002	voice vote	October 15, 2002	July 31, 2017	Incumbent
2	Margaret A. Ryan	November 15, 2006	December 8, 2006	voice vote	December 20, 2006	July 31, 2020	Incumbent
3	Scott W. Stucky	November 15, 2006	December 8, 2006	voice vote	December 20, 2006	July 31, 2021	Incumbent

=== United States Tax Court ===
#	Judge	Nomination date	Confirmation date	Confirmation vote	Began active service	Ended active service	Ended senior status
1	Thomas B. Wells	September 10, 2001	October 2, 2001	voice vote	October 10, 2001	January 1, 2011	Incumbent
2	Joseph Robert Goeke	January 15, 2003	April 3, 2003	voice vote	April 22, 2003	April 21, 2018	Incumbent
3	Robert Wherry	February 6, 2003	April 3, 2003	voice vote	April 23, 2003	April 8, 2014	January 1, 2018
4	Harry Haines	February 12, 2003	April 3, 2003	voice vote	April 22, 2003	May 30, 2009	2016
5	Diane Kroupa	February 25, 2003	April 3, 2003	voice vote	June 13, 2003	June 16, 2014	–
6	Mark V. Holmes	February 25, 2003	April 3, 2003	voice vote	June 30, 2003	June 30, 2018	Incumbent
7	John O. Colvin	May 13, 2004	July 22, 2004	voice vote	August 12, 2004	November 17, 2016	March 11, 2024
8	James Halpern	September 6, 2005	October 28, 2005	voice vote	November 2, 2005	October 16, 2015	Incumbent
9	Richard T. Morrison	November 15, 2007	July 7, 2008	voice vote	August 29, 2008	August 28, 2023	Incumbent
10	David Gustafson	February 14, 2008	July 7, 2008	voice vote	July 29, 2008	November 1, 2022	Incumbent
11	Elizabeth Crewson Paris	February 14, 2008	July 7, 2008	voice vote	July 30, 2008	July 29, 2023	Incumbent

== Territorial courts (Article IV) ==
#	Judge	Court	Nomination date	Confirmation date	Confirmation vote	Began active service	Ended active service	Ended senior status
1	Curtis V. Gómez	D.V.I.	November 25, 2003	November 21, 2004	voice vote	January 28, 2005	April 27, 2020	Incumbent
2	Raymond L. Finch	D.V.I.	February 2, 2004	November 21, 2004	voice vote	Reappointment (September 1, 1994)	August 15, 2008	Incumbent
3	Frances Tydingco-Gatewood	D. Guam	April 25, 2006	August 3, 2006	voice vote	October 30, 2006	Incumbent	–

== Notes ==
Courts

Renominations

== Sources ==
- Federal Judicial Center
