= Burciaga =

Burciaga is a surname. Notable people with the surname include:

- Jessica Burciaga (born 1983), American model
- José Antonio Burciaga (1940–1996), Chicano artist, poet, and writer
- José Burciaga Jr. (born 1981), Mexican American soccer player
- Juan Guerrero Burciaga (1929–1995), United States federal judge
