= David H. Urias =

American judge (born 1967)

David Herrera Urias
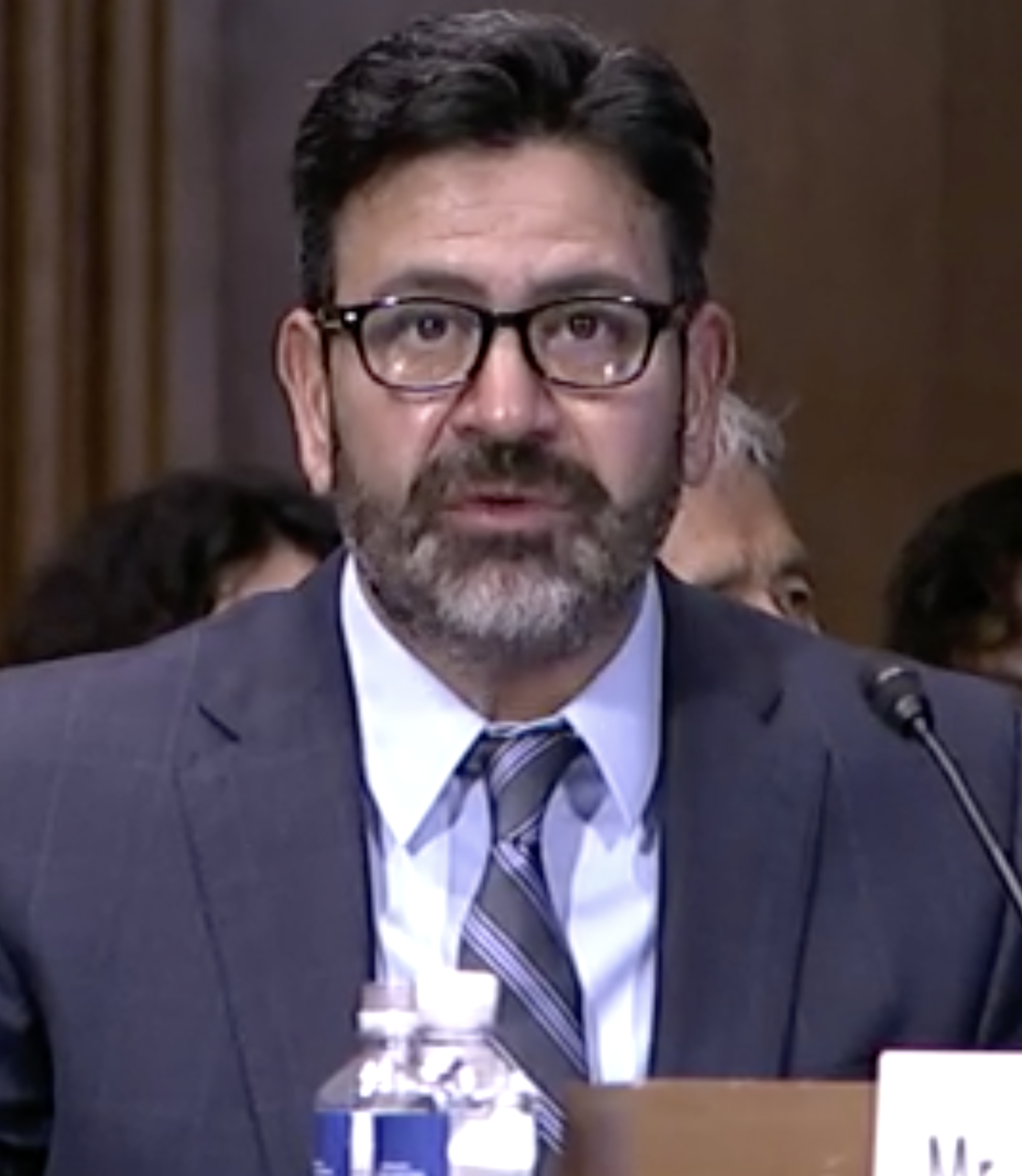

Judge of the United States District Court for the District of New Mexico
- Incumbent
- Assumed office January 14, 2022
- Appointed by: Joe Biden
- Preceded by: Martha Vázquez

Personal details
- Born: 1967 (age 57–58); Pecos, Texas, U.S.
- Education: University of New Mexico (BA, JD)

David Herrera Urias (born 1967) is an American lawyer serving as a United States district judge of the United States District Court for the District of New Mexico.

== Early life and education ==
Born in Pecos, Texas, Urias was raised in Albuquerque, New Mexico, the son of Estella Urias and David D. Urias. He has two siblings. He earned a Bachelor of Arts degree from the University of New Mexico in 1997 and a Juris Doctor from the University of New Mexico School of Law in 2001.

== Career ==
In 2001 and 2002, Urias served as a law clerk for Judge Vanessa Ruiz of the District of Columbia Court of Appeals. After his clerkship, Urias won the Fried Frank Civil Rights Fellowship. From 2002 to 2004, he was an associate at Fried, Frank, Harris, Shriver & Jacobson in New York City. From 2004 to 2008, he worked as a staff attorney for the Mexican American Legal Defense and Educational Fund. He joined Freedman Boyd Hollander Goldberg Urias & Ward, P.A. in 2008.

=== Federal judicial service ===
On September 8, 2021, President Joe Biden announced his intent to nominate Urias to serve as a United States district judge of the United States District Court for the District of New Mexico. On September 20, 2021, his nomination was sent to the Senate. President Biden nominated Urias to the seat to be vacated by Judge Martha Vázquez, who subsequently assumed senior status in 2022. On November 3, 2021, a hearing on his nomination was held before the Senate Judiciary Committee. During his confirmation hearing, he was criticized by Senator Marsha Blackburn over his affiliation with the ACLU of New Mexico. On December 2, 2021, his nomination was reported out of committee by a 12–10 vote. On December 17, 2021, the United States Senate invoked cloture on his nomination by a 45–25 vote. His nomination was confirmed that same day by a 45–26 vote. He received his judicial commission on January 14, 2022, was sworn in by Judge James O. Browning on January 21, 2022.

==== Notable rulings ====
In September 2023, New Mexico Governor Michelle Lujan Grisham issued a public health order suspending the right to carry either open or concealed firearms at most public places in the Albuquerque area. Urias granted a temporary restraining order, and in response Grisham narrowed the order to only prohibit guns in public parks and playgrounds. In October 2023, after the temporary restraining order had expired, Urias declined a request by gun rights advocates to block the firearm restrictions while legal challenges over the order's constitutionality move forward.

== See also ==
- List of Hispanic and Latino American jurists

Legal offices
Preceded by Martha Vázquez	Judge of the United States District Court for the District of New Mexico; 2022–present	Incumbent
