= Martha Vázquez =

American judge (born 1953)

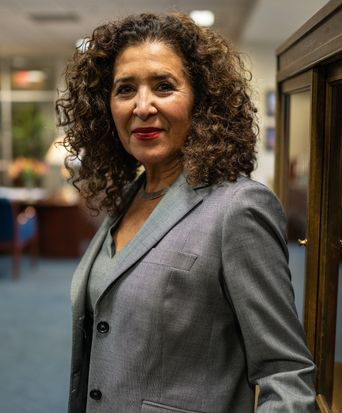

Senior Judge of the United States District Court for the District of New Mexico
- Incumbent
- Assumed office December 31, 2021

Chief Judge of the United States District Court for the District of New Mexico
- In office 2003–2010
- Preceded by: James Aubrey Parker
- Succeeded by: Bruce D. Black

Judge of the United States District Court for the District of New Mexico
- In office October 1, 1993 – December 31, 2021
- Appointed by: Bill Clinton
- Preceded by: Santiago E. Campos
- Succeeded by: David H. Urias

Personal details
- Born: February 21, 1953 (age 73) Santa Barbara, California, U.S.
- Education: University of Notre Dame (BA, JD)

Martha Alicia Vázquez (born February 21, 1953) is a senior United States district judge of the United States District Court for the District of New Mexico.

== Education and career ==
Born in Santa Barbara, California, Vázquez is an alumna of the University of Notre Dame, where she received a Bachelor of Arts degree in 1975, followed by a Juris Doctor from the Notre Dame Law School in 1978. Following a brief stint with Michigan Migrant Legal Services, she was a public defender in New Mexico from 1979 to 1981, and then entered private practice, in Santa Fe, New Mexico, from 1981 until her appointment to the federal bench in 1993.

=== Federal judicial service ===
On August 6, 1993, Vázquez was nominated by President Bill Clinton for the judge seat on the District Court vacated by Santiago E. Campos. She was confirmed by the United States Senate on September 30, 1993, and received her commission on October 1, 1993. She was sworn in on October 6, 1993. She served as chief judge of the court from 2003 to 2010. She assumed senior status on December 31, 2021.

== See also ==
- List of Hispanic and Latino American jurists

Legal offices
Preceded by Santiago E. Campos	Judge of the United States District Court for the District of New Mexico; 1993–2021	Succeeded by David H. Urias
Preceded by James Aubrey Parker	Chief Judge of the United States District Court for the District of New Mexico; 2003–2010	Succeeded by Bruce D. Black
