= Harris Hartz =

American judge (born 1947)

Judge of the United States Court of Appeals for the Tenth Circuit
- Incumbent
- Assumed office December 10, 2001
- Appointed by: George W. Bush
- Preceded by: Bobby Baldock

Personal details
- Born: 1947 (age 78–79) Baltimore, Maryland, U.S.
- Education: Harvard University (BA, JD)

Harris L. Hartz (born 1947) is an American jurist and lawyer who serves as a federal judge on the U.S. Court of Appeals for the Tenth Circuit.

== Early life and education ==
Hartz was born in 1947 in Baltimore, Maryland. He grew up in Farmington, New Mexico, and graduated from Farmington High School in 1963 as valedictorian. He then studied physics at Harvard University, graduating in 1967 with an A.B. summa cum laude.

After college, Hartz received a fellowship to pursue graduate study in physics at Princeton University, but dropped out after one year. From 1968 to 1969, Hartz worked on the reelection campaign of U.S. Senator Jacob Javits and as a reporter for The Record, a newspaper in northern New Jersey. Hartz then attended Harvard Law School, where he was an editor of the Harvard Law Review. He graduated in 1972 with a Juris Doctor magna cum laude.

== Career ==
Prior to his appointment to the Tenth Circuit, Hartz had a record of experience both in public service and private practice. He was an assistant United States attorney for the District of New Mexico from 1972 to 1975, and thereafter spent a year as an assistant professor of law at University of Illinois College of Law in Champaign, Illinois. He served on the Governor of New Mexico's Organized Crime Prevention Commission from 1976–1979, first as counsel, then as executive director. After that, he was in private practice for nine years before serving as a judge and chief judge on the New Mexico Court of Appeals from 1988 to 1999, during which time he authored approximately 300 opinions. He then returned to private practice at a law firm, serving as Special Counsel to the International Brotherhood of Teamsters, where he worked with the union to develop a code of conduct and an internal system for compliance and enforcement.

=== Federal judicial service ===
Hartz was nominated to the United States Court of Appeals for the Tenth Circuit by President George W. Bush on September 4, 2001 to replace Judge Bobby Baldock, who assumed senior status. Hartz was confirmed by the United States Senate on December 6, 2001, by a 99–0 vote. He received his commission on December 10, 2001.

=== Notable cases ===
- Riviera Drilling & Exploration Co. v. Gunnison Energy Corp. et al., No. 10-1081 (10th Cir. 2014) – In an unpublished order and judgment written by Judge Hartz, the Tenth Circuit affirmed the lower court's dismissal of a $100 million antitrust case against an energy company accused of setting artificially high prices for its gas pipeline in Colorado.
- United States v. Heineman, 767 F.3d 970 (10th Cir. 2014) – In a first amendment free speech case, Defendant Aaron Michael Heineman e-mailed a hateful poem to a University of Utah professor. In an opinion written by Judge Hartz, the Tenth Circuit adhered to the view that Virginia v. Black required the district court to find that Defendant intended to instill fear before it could convict him of violating 18 U.S.C. § 875(c).
- Endrew F. v. Douglas County School Dist. RE–1, 798 F.3d 1329 (10th Cir. 2015) – In a case where parents of Endrew F., a child with autism, appealed a case to the court in an effort to be reimbursed for private school tuition resulting from lack of Free Appropriate Public Education (FAPE) under the Individuals with Disabilities Education Act (IDEA) given to their child by their school district, the court ruled that Endrew had received "some educational benefit" (as per Board of Education v. Rowley) and had thus had received FAPE and did not qualify for reimbursement. This case was successfully appealed to the Supreme Court in which the justices found that the way which the 10th Circuit determined if Endrew had received FAPE was wrong, remanding the case back to the lower courts for review.

== Works ==
- Hartz, Harris (2014). "How do Judges Think?". Denver University Law Review. 91: 575–581.
- Hartz, Harris (20 October 2009). "Remarks Before Sentencing Commission" (PDF). USSC.gov. United States Sentencing Commission.

Legal offices
Preceded by Bobby Baldock	Judge of the United States Court of Appeals for the Tenth Circuit; 2001–present	Incumbent
