= Gregory J. Fouratt =

United States magistrate judge

Magistrate Judge of the United States District Court for the District of New Mexico
- Incumbent
- Assumed office February 29, 2016

United States Attorney for the District of New Mexico
- In office January 25, 2008 – May 2010
- Preceded by: Larry Gomez
- Succeeded by: Kenneth J. Gonzales

Personal details
- Born: Gregory James Fouratt
- Education: New Mexico State University (BA); Golden Gate University (MPA); Texas Tech University School of Law (JD)

Military service
- Allegiance: United States
- Branch/service: United States Air Force
- Years of service: 1988–2012
- Rank: Lieutenant colonel

Gregory James Fouratt is a United States magistrate judge for the United States District Court for the District of New Mexico. He previously served as a United States Attorney for the same district.

== Early life and education ==
Fouratt earned a Bachelor of Arts degree in 1988 from New Mexico State University and a Master of Public Administration degree in 1991 from Golden Gate University. He graduated first in his class with a Juris Doctor from the Texas Tech University School of Law in 1995. He was also an officer in the U.S. Air Force and remains a member of the Air National Guard. He is a self-described specialist in the areas of racketeering, capital murder and gang related crimes. He served as the Secretary of the New Mexico Department of Public Safety. On February 22, 2016, it was announced that Fouratt would be appointed as a U.S. Magistrate judge.

== Career ==
Fouratt was appointed on January 25, 2008, by an administrative order issued by the U.S. Federal District Court of New Mexico. He succeeded Larry Gomez, a temporary appointee of Acting United States Attorney General Peter D. Keisler, who had succeeded David Iglesias.
