= Sarah M. Davenport =

American judge (born 1976)

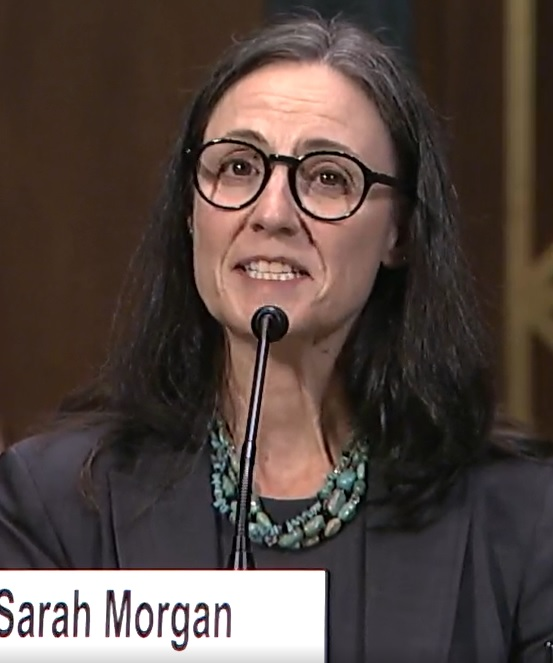

Judge of the United States District Court for the District of New Mexico
- Incumbent
- Assumed office January 13, 2025
- Appointed by: Joe Biden
- Preceded by: William P. Johnson

Personal details
- Born: Sarah Beth Morgan; 1976 (age 49–50) Hobbs, New Mexico, U.S.
- Education: New Mexico State University (BMus); University of New Mexico (JD)

Sarah Morgan Davenport (born 1976) is an American lawyer who serves as a United States district judge of the United States District Court for the District of New Mexico.

== Education ==
Davenport received a Bachelor of Music from New Mexico State University in 1998 and a Juris Doctor from the University of New Mexico School of Law in 2006.

== Career ==
From 2006 to 2008, she was a law clerk in the U.S. Attorney's Office in Albuquerque, New Mexico and from 2008 to 2009, she was as a special assistant United States attorney in Las Cruces. From 2009 to 2025, she served as an assistant United States attorney in the U.S. Attorney's Office for the District of New Mexico.

=== Federal judicial service ===
On August 28, 2024, President Joe Biden announced his intent to nominate Davenport to serve as a United States district judge of the United States District Court for the District of New Mexico. Her nomination was supported by Senators Martin Heinrich and Ben Ray Luján. On September 9, 2024, her nomination was sent to the Senate. President Biden nominated Davenport to the seat being vacated by Judge William P. Johnson, who announced his intent to assume senior status upon confirmation of a successor. On September 25, 2024, a hearing on her nomination was held before the Senate Judiciary Committee. On November 21, 2024, her nomination was reported out of committee by an 11–10 party-line vote. On December 4, 2024, the United States Senate invoked cloture on her nomination by a 50–45 vote. The following day, her nomination was confirmed by a 52–45 vote. She received her judicial commission on January 13, 2025, and was sworn in by Senior Judge Robert C. Brack on the same day.

Legal offices
Preceded by William P. Johnson	Judge of the United States District Court for the District of New Mexico; 2025–present	Incumbent
