= William P. Johnson =

American judge (born 1959)

William Paul Johnson
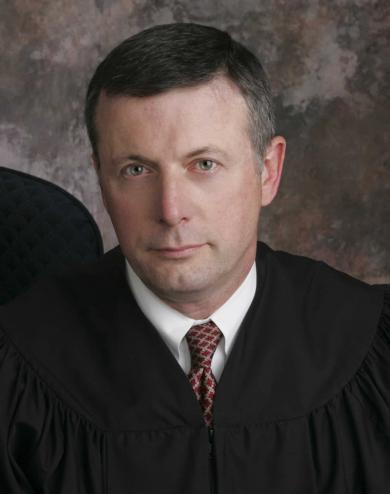

Judge of the United States District Court for the District of New Mexico
- In office December 21, 2001 – January 10, 2025
- Appointed by: George W. Bush
- Preceded by: John Edwards Conway
- Succeeded by: Sarah M. Davenport

Chief Judge of the United States District Court for the District of New Mexico
- In office February 7, 2018 – January 10, 2025
- Preceded by: Christina Armijo
- Succeeded by: Kenneth J. Gonzales

Senior Judge of the United States District Court for the District of New Mexico
- In office January 10, 2025 – September 30, 2026

Personal details
- Born: William Paul Johnson; 1959 (age 66–67) Roanoke, Virginia, U.S.
- Education: Virginia Military Institute (BA); Washington and Lee University (JD)

William Paul Johnson (born 1959) is an American jurist who served as a United States district judge of the United States District Court for the District of New Mexico from 2001 to 2026.

== Early life and education ==
Johnson was born in Roanoke, Virginia. He was an Eagle Scout in the Boy Scouts of America. He received a Bachelor of Arts degree in the economics from Virginia Military Institute in 1981 and a Juris Doctor from Washington and Lee University in 1985. He went to Fort Sill to become an artillery officer and served in the United States Army Reserve from 1981 to 1990. He achieved the rank of captain. He was in private practice in Houston, Texas, from 1985 to 1986, and in Roswell, New Mexico, from 1986 to 1995. He was a judge on the state Fifth Judicial District Court from 1995 to 2001.

=== Federal judicial service ===
Johnson was nominated by President George W. Bush on September 4, 2001, to a seat vacated by John Edwards Conway. He was confirmed by the United States Senate on December 13, 2001, and received his commission on December 21, 2001. He served as chief judge from February 7, 2018, to January 10, 2025. He assumed senior status on January 10, 2025, and retired from the court of September 30, 2026. He served as a member of the Judicial Conference of the United States from 2023 to 2026.

== Sources ==
Legal offices
Preceded by John Edwards Conway	Judge of the United States District Court for the District of New Mexico; 2001–2025	Succeeded by Sarah M. Davenport
Preceded by Christina Armijo	Chief Judge of the United States District Court for the District of New Mexico; 2018–2025	Succeeded by Kenneth J. Gonzales
