= Judith C. Herrera =

American judge (born 1954)

Judith Herrera

Senior Judge of the United States District Court for the District of New Mexico
- Incumbent
- Assumed office July 1, 2019

Judge of the United States District Court for the District of New Mexico
- In office June 13, 2004 – July 1, 2019
- Appointed by: George W. Bush
- Preceded by: James Aubrey Parker
- Succeeded by: Matthew L. Garcia

Personal details
- Born: Judith Claire Herrera; April 28, 1954 (age 72) Chicago, Illinois, U.S.
- Education: University of New Mexico (BA); Georgetown University (JD)

Judith Claire Herrera (born April 28, 1954) is an American attorney serving as a senior United States district judge of the United States District Court for the District of New Mexico.

== Early life and education ==
Born in Chicago, Herrera received a Bachelor of Arts degree from the University of New Mexico in 1976 and a Juris Doctor from Georgetown University Law Center in 1979.

== Career ==
Herrera served as an assistant district attorney in Santa Fe, New Mexico, from 1979 to 1980, and was then in private practice in Santa Fe until 2004. She was a member of the Santa Fe City Council from 1981 to 1986.

=== Federal judicial service ===
On September 23, 2003, Herrera was nominated by President George W. Bush to a seat on the United States District Court for the District of New Mexico vacated by James Aubrey Parker. She was confirmed by the United States Senate on June 3, 2004, and received her commission on June 13, 2004. She assumed senior status on July 1, 2019.

== See also ==
- List of Hispanic and Latino American jurists

Legal offices
Preceded by James Aubrey Parker	Judge of the United States District Court for the District of New Mexico; 2004–2019	Succeeded by Matthew L. Garcia
