= James Aubrey Parker =

American judge (1937–2022)

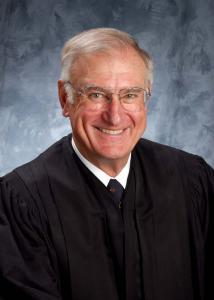

Senior Judge of the United States District Court for the District of New Mexico
- In office September 1, 2003 – September 16, 2022

Chief Judge of the United States District Court for the District of New Mexico
- In office 2000–2003
- Preceded by: John Edwards Conway
- Succeeded by: Martha Vázquez

Judge of the United States District Court for the District of New Mexico
- In office November 6, 1987 – September 1, 2003
- Appointed by: Ronald Reagan
- Preceded by: Howard C. Bratton
- Succeeded by: Judith C. Herrera

Personal details
- Born: January 8, 1937 Houston, Texas, U.S.
- Died: September 16, 2022 (aged 85)
- Education: Rice University (BA); University of Texas (LLB)

James Aubrey Parker (January 8, 1937 – September 16, 2022) was a United States district judge of the United States District Court for the District of New Mexico.

== Education and career ==
Born in Houston, Texas, Parker received a Bachelor of Arts degree from Rice University in 1959 and a Bachelor of Laws from the University of Texas School of Law in 1962. He was in private practice in Albuquerque, New Mexico, from 1962 to 1987.

== Federal judicial service ==
On July 10, 1987, Parker was nominated by President Ronald Reagan to a seat on the United States District Court for the District of New Mexico vacated by Judge Howard C. Bratton. Parker was confirmed by the United States Senate on November 5, 1987, and received his commission on November 6, 1987. He served as Chief Judge from 2000 to 2003, assuming senior status on September 1, 2003.

He was involved in the Wen Ho Lee nuclear espionage case. He later apologized to Dr. Lee for the unfair manner in which he was treated. He wrote that he regretted being misled by the executive branch into ordering Dr. Lee's detention, stating that he was led astray by the Department of Justice, by its FBI, and by its United States attorney. He formally denounced the government for abuse of power in its prosecution of the case. Later, President Bill Clinton remarked that he had been "troubled" by the way Dr. Lee was treated.

Parker died on September 16, 2022, at the age of 85.

== Sources ==
Legal offices
Preceded by Howard C. Bratton	Judge of the United States District Court for the District of New Mexico; 1987–2003	Succeeded by Judith C. Herrera
Preceded by John Edwards Conway	Chief Judge of the United States District Court for the District of New Mexico; 2000–2003	Succeeded by Martha Vázquez
