= Curtis LeRoy Hansen =

American judge (1933–2023)

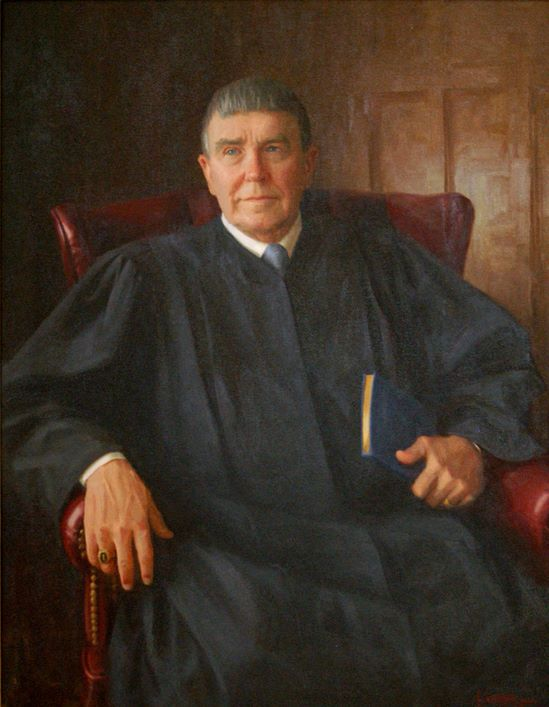

Senior Judge of the United States District Court for the District of New Mexico
- In office April 18, 2003 – October 27, 2023

Judge of the United States District Court for the District of New Mexico
- In office October 2, 1992 – April 18, 2003
- Appointed by: George H. W. Bush
- Preceded by: Seat established by 104 Stat. 5089
- Succeeded by: James O. Browning

Personal details
- Born: Curtis LeRoy Hansen; April 18, 1933 Audubon County, Iowa, U.S.
- Died: October 27, 2023 (aged 90)
- Education: University of Iowa (BS); University of New Mexico (JD)

Curtis LeRoy Hansen (April 18, 1933 – October 27, 2023) was a United States district judge of the United States District Court for the District of New Mexico.

== Education and career ==
Curtis LeRoy Hansen was born in Audubon County, Iowa on April 18, 1933. He received a Bachelor of Science degree from University of Iowa in 1956. He moved to Albuquerque to work at Sandia National Laboratories on the nuclear weapons project. Hansen received a Juris Doctor from University of New Mexico School of Law in 1961. He was the first editor-in-chief of the Natural Resources Journal. He was a law clerk for the Judge Irwin S. Moise of the New Mexico Supreme Court from 1961 to 1962. He was in private practice of law in Albuquerque, New Mexico from 1962 to 1992.

== Federal judicial service ==
Hansen was nominated by President George H. W. Bush on March 20, 1992, to the United States District Court for the District of New Mexico, to a new seat created by 104 Stat. 5089. He was confirmed by the United States Senate on September 25, 1992, and received his commission on October 2, 1992. He assumed senior status on April 18, 2003.

== Death ==
Hansen died on October 27, 2023, at the age of 90.

== Sources ==
- Leroy C. Hansen, interview with State Bar of New Mexico.
- Senior District Judge, District of New Mexico Website.

Legal offices
Preceded by Seat established by 104 Stat. 5089	Judge of the United States District Court for the District of New Mexico; 1992–2003	Succeeded by James O. Browning
