= Juan Guerrero Burciaga =

American judge (1929–1995)

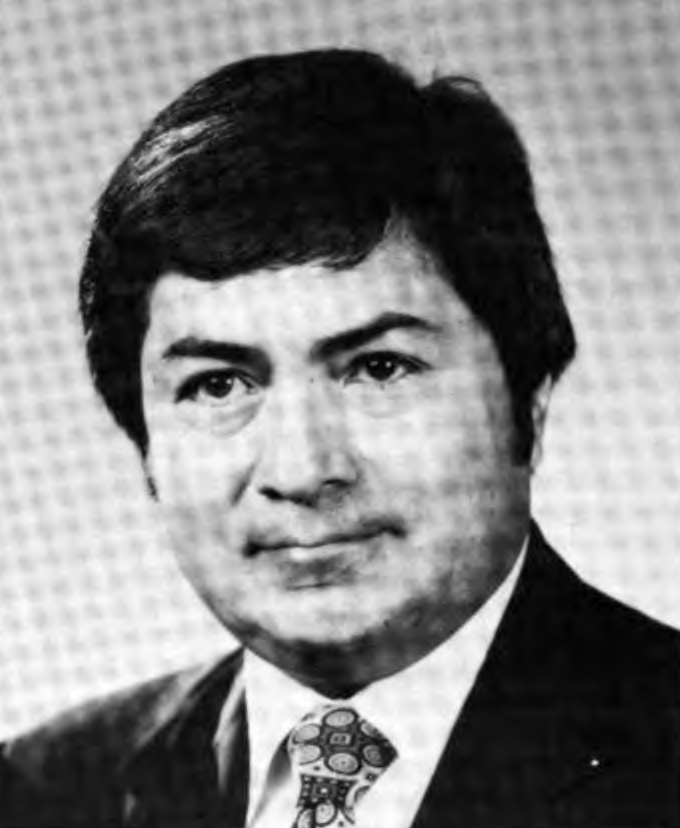

Senior Judge of the United States District Court for the District of New Mexico
- In office November 9, 1994 – March 5, 1995

Chief Judge of the United States District Court for the District of New Mexico
- In office 1989–1994
- Preceded by: Santiago E. Campos
- Succeeded by: John Edwards Conway

Judge of the United States District Court for the District of New Mexico
- In office November 2, 1979 – November 9, 1994
- Appointed by: Jimmy Carter
- Preceded by: Seat established by 92 Stat. 1629
- Succeeded by: Bruce D. Black

Personal details
- Born: Juan Guerrero Burciaga; August 17, 1929 Roswell, New Mexico, U.S.
- Died: March 5, 1995 (aged 65) Albuquerque, New Mexico, U.S.
- Education: United States Military Academy (BS); University of New Mexico School of Law (JD)

Juan Guerrero Burciaga (August 17, 1929 – March 5, 1995) was a United States district judge of the United States District Court for the District of New Mexico.

== Education and career ==
Born in Roswell, New Mexico, Burciaga received a Bachelor of Science degree from the United States Military Academy in 1952 and was a United States Air Force pilot from 1952 to 1959. He received a Juris Doctor from the University of New Mexico School of Law in 1963. He was a law clerk for Judge Harry Vearle Payne of the United States District Court for the District New Mexico from 1963 to 1964. He was in private practice in Albuquerque, New Mexico from 1964 to 1968. He was a special assistant state attorney general of Office of the State Attorney General in Santa Fe, New Mexico from 1967 to 1969, thereafter returning to his private practice from 1969 to 1979. He was also a lecturer at the University of New Mexico School of Law from 1970 to 1971, and was a special prosecutor for the First Judicial District in Santa Fe in 1975.

== Federal judicial service ==
On July 19, 1979, Burciaga was nominated by President Jimmy Carter to a new seat on the United States District Court for the District of New Mexico created by 92 Stat. 1629. He was confirmed by the United States Senate on October 31, 1979, and received his commission on November 2, 1979. He served as Chief Judge from 1989 to 1994, assuming senior status on November 9, 1994. Burciaga served until his death on March 5, 1995, at the Presbyterian Hospital in Albuquerque of an aortic aneurysm.

== Notable case ==
Burciaga ruled against the National Collegiate Athletic Association in a case that allowed schools to contract television rights for their football programs thus leading to the many games seen now.

== See also ==
- List of Hispanic and Latino American jurists

== Sources ==
Legal offices
Preceded by Seat established by 92 Stat. 1629	Judge of the United States District Court for the District of New Mexico; 1979–1994	Succeeded by Bruce D. Black
Preceded by Santiago E. Campos	Chief Judge of the United States District Court for the District of New Mexico; 1989–1994	Succeeded by John Edwards Conway
