= James O. Browning =

American judge (born 1956)

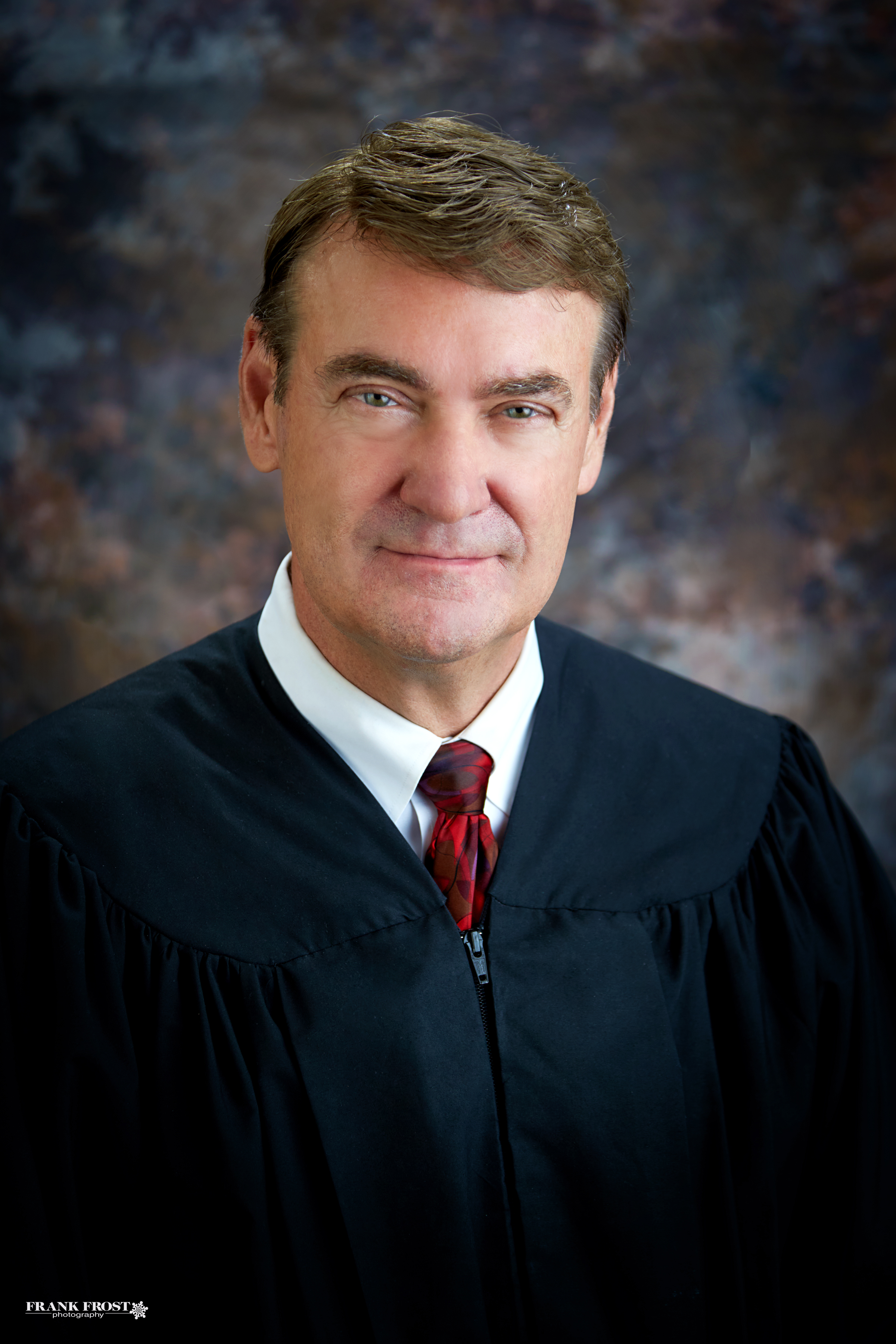

Judge of the United States District Court for the District of New Mexico
- In office August 1, 2003 – February 1, 2026
- Appointed by: George W. Bush
- Preceded by: Curtis LeRoy Hansen
- Succeeded by: Vacant

Senior Judge of the United States District Court for the District of New Mexico
- In office February 1, 2026 – August 28, 2026

Personal details
- Born: James Oren Browning; April 6, 1956 (age 70) Levelland, Texas, U.S.
- Education: Yale University (BA); University of Virginia (JD)

James Oren Browning (born April 6, 1956) is an American attorney who served as a United States district judge of the United States District Court for the District of New Mexico from 2003 to 2026.

== Early life and education ==
Browning was born in Levelland, Texas, and grew up in Hobbs, New Mexico. He received a Bachelor of Arts degree in political science from Yale University in 1978, graduating magna cum laude. While at Yale, Browning played varsity football. He then earned a Juris Doctor from the University of Virginia Law School in 1981. In law school, he was editor in chief of the Virginia Law Review. He is a member of the Raven Society and the Order of the Coif. Browning married his wife, Jan, in 1978 and they remained married until her death in 2019. The couple had three children.

== Career ==
After law school, Browning served as a law clerk for Judge Collins J. Seitz on the United States Court of Appeals for the Third Circuit from 1981 to 1982 and then clerked for Justice Lewis F. Powell Jr. of the Supreme Court of the United States from 1982 to 1983. After finishing his judicial clerkships, Browning returned to New Mexico and began working at the law firm Rodey, Dickason, Sloan, Akin, & Robb. He was a deputy attorney general of the New Mexico Office of the Attorney General from 1987 to 1988. Afterward, he returned to private practice at Rodey, Dickason, Sloan, Akin, & Robb. In 1990, he formed his own law firm, Browning & Peifer, P.A. He continued to practice at Browning & Peifer until his appointment to the federal bench in 2003.

=== Federal judicial service ===
Browing was nominated by President George W. Bush on April 28, 2003, to be a United States District Judge of the United States District Court for the District of New Mexico, to a seat vacated by Curtis LeRoy Hansen. He was confirmed by the United States Senate on July 31, 2003, and received commission on August 1, 2003. He assumed senior status on February 1, 2026, and retired from the court on August 28, 2026.

== See also ==
- List of law clerks for the first seat of the Supreme Court of the United States

Legal offices
| Preceded by Curtis LeRoy Hansen | Judge of the United States District Court for the District of New Mexico; 2003–2026 | Vacant |
