= Bruce D. Black =

American judge (born 1947)

Senior Judge of the United States District Court for the District of New Mexico
- In office October 1, 2012 – January 1, 2017

Chief Judge of the United States District Court for the District of New Mexico
- In office 2010–2012
- Preceded by: Martha Vázquez
- Succeeded by: Christina Armijo

Judge of the United States District Court for the District of New Mexico
- In office December 26, 1995 – October 1, 2012
- Appointed by: Bill Clinton
- Preceded by: Juan Guerrero Burciaga
- Succeeded by: Kenneth J. Gonzales

Personal details
- Born: Bruce Douglas Black; July 27, 1947 (age 79) Detroit, Michigan, U.S.
- Education: Albion College (BA); University of Michigan (JD)

Bruce Douglas Black (born July 27, 1947) is an American attorney and jurist who served as a United States district judge of the United States District Court for the District of New Mexico from 1995 to 2017.

== Early life and education ==
Born in Detroit, Michigan, Black received a Bachelor of Arts degree from Albion College in 1969 and a Juris Doctor from the University of Michigan Law School in 1971.

== Career ==
He was in private practice in New Mexico from 1972 to 1991. He was a judge on the New Mexico Court of Appeals from 1991 to 1995.

On August 10, 1995, Black was nominated by President Bill Clinton to a seat on the United States District Court for the District of New Mexico vacated by Juan Guerrero Burciaga. Black was confirmed by the United States Senate on December 22, 1995, and received his commission on December 26, 1995. He served as chief judge from 2010 to 2012. He assumed senior status on October 1, 2012. He retired from active service on January 1, 2017.

Legal offices
Preceded by Juan Guerrero Burciaga	Judge of the United States District Court for the District of New Mexico; 1995–2012	Succeeded by Kenneth J. Gonzales
Preceded by Martha Vázquez	Chief Judge of the United States District Court for the District of New Mexico; 2010–2012	Succeeded by Christina Armijo
