= John Edwards Conway =

American judge

Judge of the United States Foreign Intelligence Surveillance Court
- In office May 19, 2002 – October 30, 2003
- Appointed by: William Rehnquist
- Preceded by: seat established
- Succeeded by: Dee Benson

Senior Judge of the United States District Court for the District of New Mexico
- In office September 1, 2000 – June 1, 2014

Chief Judge of the United States District Court for the District of New Mexico
- In office 1994–2000
- Preceded by: Juan Guerrero Burciaga
- Succeeded by: James Aubrey Parker

Judge of the United States District Court for the District of New Mexico
- In office June 16, 1986 – September 1, 2000
- Appointed by: Ronald Reagan
- Preceded by: Bobby Baldock
- Succeeded by: William P. Johnson

Personal details
- Born: John Edwards Conway; September 1, 1934 Joplin, Missouri, U.S.
- Died: June 1, 2014 (aged 79) Albuquerque, New Mexico, U.S.
- Education: United States Naval Academy (BS); Washburn University (LLB)

John Edwards Conway (September 1, 1934 – June 1, 2014) was a United States district judge of the United States District Court for the District of New Mexico.

== Education and career ==
Conway was born in Joplin, Missouri. He received a Bachelor of Science degree from the United States Naval Academy in 1956 and was a United States Air Force Lieutenant from 1956 to 1960, remaining in the United States Air Force Reserve from 1960 to 1970. He received a Bachelor of Laws from Washburn University School of Law in 1963, and entered private practice in Santa Fe, New Mexico until 1964, and then in Alamogordo, New Mexico until 1980. He was a city attorney of Alamogordo from 1966 to 1972. He was a New Mexico state senator from 1970 to 1980, serving as minority leader of the New Mexico State Senate from 1972 to 1980. He was in private practice in Albuquerque, New Mexico from 1980 to 1986.

=== Federal judicial service ===
On May 14, 1986, Conway was nominated by President Ronald Reagan to a seat on the United States District Court for the District of New Mexico vacated by Judge Bobby Baldock. Conway was confirmed by the United States Senate on June 13, 1986, and received his commission on June 16, 1986. He served as Chief Judge from 1994 to 2000, assuming senior status on September 1, 2000. He died on June 1, 2014.

=== FISA Court ===
Conway was appointed to the FISA Court in 2000 or 2002, to a short term scheduled to end 5/18/2007, or a full 7-year term, and did not serve even the shorter term, leaving under mysterious circumstances around 2005.

== Sources ==
Legal offices
Preceded by Bobby Baldock	Judge of the United States District Court for the District of New Mexico; 1986–2000	Succeeded by William P. Johnson
Preceded by Juan Guerrero Burciaga	Chief Judge of the United States District Court for the District of New Mexico; 1994–2000	Succeeded by James Aubrey Parker
New seat	Judge of the United States Foreign Intelligence Surveillance Court; 2011–2013	Succeeded by Dee Benson
