= Bobby Baldock =

American judge (born 1936)

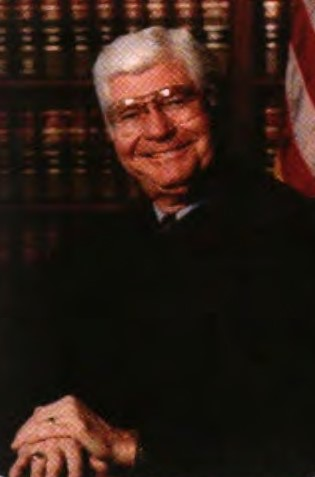

Senior Judge of the United States Court of Appeals for the Tenth Circuit
- Incumbent
- Assumed office January 26, 2001

Judge of the United States Foreign Intelligence Surveillance Court of Review
- In office June 17, 1992 – May 18, 1998
- Appointed by: William Rehnquist
- Preceded by: Edward Skottowe Northrop
- Succeeded by: Ralph B. Guy Jr.

Judge of the United States Court of Appeals for the Tenth Circuit
- In office December 17, 1985 – January 26, 2001
- Appointed by: Ronald Reagan
- Preceded by: Oliver Seth
- Succeeded by: Harris Hartz

Judge of the United States District Court for the District of New Mexico
- In office June 7, 1983 – January 24, 1986
- Appointed by: Ronald Reagan
- Preceded by: Edwin L. Mechem
- Succeeded by: John Edwards Conway

Personal details
- Born: Bobby Ray Baldock; January 24, 1936 (age 90) Rocky, Oklahoma, U.S.
- Spouse: Mary Holt
- Education: New Mexico Military Institute; University of Arizona (JD)

Military service
- Branch/service: United States Army
- Years of service: 1960–1970
- Unit: New Mexico National Guard

Bobby Ray Baldock (born January 24, 1936) is an American attorney and jurist serving as a Senior United States circuit judge of the United States Court of Appeals for the Tenth Circuit. He was previously a United States district judge of the United States District Court for the District of New Mexico.

== Early life and education ==
Baldock was born in Rocky, Oklahoma and graduated from New Mexico Military Institute in 1956. He received a Juris Doctor from the University of Arizona College of Law in 1960.

== Career ==
Baldock was a Captain and Adjutant General Staff in the New Mexico National Guard from 1960 to 1970. He also operated a private legal practice in Roswell, New Mexico from 1960 to 1983. He was an adjunct professor at Eastern New Mexico University–Roswell from 1962 to 1981.

== Federal judicial service ==
Baldock was nominated by President Ronald Reagan on May 2, 1983, to a seat on the United States District Court for the District of New Mexico vacated by Judge Edwin L. Mechem. He was confirmed by the United States Senate on June 6, 1983, and received his commission on June 7, 1983. Baldock's service was terminated on January 24, 1986, due to elevation to the court of appeals.

Baldock was nominated by President Reagan on October 7, 1985, to a seat on the United States Court of Appeals for the Tenth Circuit vacated by Judge Oliver Seth. He was confirmed by the Senate on December 16, 1985, and received his commission on December 17, 1985. He assumed senior status on January 26, 2001.

== See also ==
- List of United States federal judges by longevity of service

== Notes ==
Legal offices
Preceded by Edwin L. Mechem	Judge of the United States District Court for the District of New Mexico; 1982–1985	Succeeded by John Edwards Conway
Preceded by Oliver Seth	Judge of the United States Court of Appeals for the Tenth Circuit; 1985–2001	Succeeded by Harris Hartz
Preceded by Edward Skottowe Northrop	Judge of the United States Foreign Intelligence Surveillance Court of Review; 1992–1998	Succeeded by Ralph B. Guy Jr.
