= Robert C. Brack =

American judge (born 1953)

Senior Judge of the United States District Court for the District of New Mexico
- Incumbent
- Assumed office July 25, 2018

Judge of the United States District Court for the District of New Mexico
- In office July 15, 2003 – July 25, 2018
- Appointed by: George W. Bush
- Preceded by: Seat established by 116 Stat. 1758
- Succeeded by: Margaret Strickland

Personal details
- Born: Robert Charles Brack; March 2, 1953 (age 73) Lynwood, California, U.S.
- Education: Eastern New Mexico University (BA); University of New Mexico (JD)

Robert Charles Brack (born March 2, 1953) is a senior United States district judge of the United States District Court for the District of New Mexico.

== Education and career ==
Born in Lynwood, California, Brack received a Bachelor of Arts degree from Eastern New Mexico University in 1975 and a Juris Doctor from the University of New Mexico School of Law in 1978. He was in private practice in New Mexico from 1978 to 1997. He was a state district court judge in Clovis, New Mexico, from 1997 to 2003.

=== Federal judicial service ===
On April 28, 2003, Brack was nominated by President George W. Bush to a new seat on the United States District Court for the District of New Mexico created by 116 Stat. 1758. He was confirmed by the United States Senate on July 14, 2003, and received his commission on July 15, 2003. He assumed senior status on July 25, 2018.

=== Notable case ===
In July 2011, Columbus, New Mexico, dissolved its police force, due to a gun smuggling scandal that involved its village officials and others. The Mayor, a village trustee, a former police chief, and nine other people were indicted in the scandal. The case is being prosecuted by the United States Attorney from El Paso, Texas, but the case will be tried starting October 3, 2011 before Judge Brack in Las Cruces, New Mexico.

== Sources ==
Legal offices
Preceded by Seat established by 116 Stat. 1758	Judge of the United States District Court for the District of New Mexico; 2003–2018	Succeeded by Margaret Strickland
