= Matthew L. Garcia =

American judge (born 1974)

Judge of the United States District Court for the District of New Mexico
- Incumbent
- Assumed office February 21, 2023
- Appointed by: Joe Biden
- Preceded by: Judith C. Herrera

Personal details
- Born: Matthew Lane Garcia; 1974 (age 51–52) Albuquerque, New Mexico, U.S.
- Education: University of New Mexico (BA, JD); Harvard University (MPP); Helsinki School of Economics

Matthew Lane Garcia (born 1974) is an American lawyer from New Mexico who is serving as a United States district judge of the United States District Court for the District of New Mexico.

== Education ==
Garcia received a Bachelor of Arts, magna cum laude, from the University of New Mexico in 1999, a Master of Public Policy from Harvard Kennedy School in 2003 and a Juris Doctor from the University of New Mexico School of Law in 2005. Garcia received a Fulbright Scholarship to study at the Helsinki School of Economics in Finland.

== Career ==
From 2006 to 2008, Garcia was an associate at Freedman Boyd Daniels Hollander Goldberg & Ives in Albuquerque, New Mexico. From 2009 to 2012, he was a partner at Bach & Garcia in Albuquerque, New Mexico. From 2012 to 2018, he was a partner at Garcia Ives Nowara in Albuquerque. He was general counsel to New Mexico Governor Michelle Lujan Grisham from 2019 to 2020. He was appointed as interim chief of staff on October 5, 2020 by the governor, and was named permanent chief of staff on November 12, 2020, after his predecessor, John Bingaman, resigned. Garcia has worked as an adjunct professor at the University of New Mexico School of Law.

=== Notable cases ===
In 2006, Garcia represented state auditor candidate Hector Balderas, who petitioned to replace the previous Democratic Party candidate on the ballot. Petitioners Barbara Johnson, Roger Gonzales, and the Republican Party of New Mexico made three separate challenges to the upcoming 2006 general election ballot. While each petitioner relied on different arguments, all three asserted that the Secretary of State erred in including or excluding certain candidates from the 2006 general election ballot. Balderas would later become the New Mexico Attorney General.

In 2014, Garcia represented the ACLU of New Mexico as amicus curiae in a suit against the New Mexico Department of Children, Youth, and Families.

In 2016, Garcia argued before the New Mexico Supreme Court seeking to maintain a Whistleblower Protection Act claim against former secretary of state Mary Herrera; she served as the secretary of state from January 2007 until January 2011. On January 1, 2007, Herrera appointed Manny Vildasol as an office administrator. During his tenure, Vildasol suspected that secretary of state staff misused public funds and that Herrera violated election laws. Vildasol reported the suspected misconduct to the Federal Bureau of Investigation and the New Mexico Attorney General's Office. On September 4, 2010, Vildasol received a letter from Herrera terminating his employment.

In 2020, Garcia successfully defended the state's emergency authority and pandemic restrictions before the New Mexico Supreme Court in response to the COVID-19 pandemic.

=== Federal judicial service ===
On July 14, 2022, President Joe Biden nominated Garcia to serve as a United States district judge of the United States District Court for the District of New Mexico. President Biden nominated Garcia to the seat vacated by Judge Judith C. Herrera, who assumed senior status on July 1, 2019. On October 12, 2022, a hearing on his nomination was held before the Senate Judiciary Committee. On December 1, 2022, his nomination was reported out of committee by a 12–10 vote. On January 3, 2023, his nomination was returned to the President under Rule XXXI, Paragraph 6 of the United States Senate; he was renominated later the same day. On February 2, 2023, his nomination was reported out of committee by an 11–9 vote. On February 14, 2023, the Senate invoked cloture on his nomination by a 54–45 vote. That same day, his nomination was confirmed by a 53–46 vote. He received his judicial commission on February 21, 2023. He was sworn in on February 23, 2023.

== See also ==
- List of Hispanic and Latino American jurists

Legal offices
| Preceded by Judith C. Herrera | Judge of the United States District Court for the District of New Mexico; 2023–present | Incumbent |
