= Christina Armijo =

American judge (born 1951)

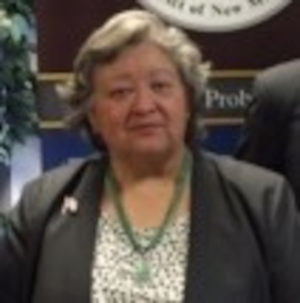

Senior Judge of the United States District Court for the District of New Mexico
- Incumbent
- Assumed office February 7, 2018

Chief Judge of the United States District Court for the District of New Mexico
- In office October 1, 2012 – February 7, 2018
- Preceded by: Bruce D. Black
- Succeeded by: William P. Johnson

Judge of the United States District Court for the District of New Mexico
- In office November 12, 2001 – February 7, 2018
- Appointed by: George W. Bush
- Preceded by: Seat established by 114 Stat. 2762
- Succeeded by: Kea W. Riggs

Personal details
- Born: Maria Christina Armijo; January 17, 1951 (age 75) Las Vegas, New Mexico, U.S.
- Education: University of New Mexico (BA, JD)

Maria Christina Armijo (born January 17, 1951) is an inactive Senior United States district judge of the United States District Court for the District of New Mexico.

== Early life and education ==
Born in Las Vegas, New Mexico, Armijo graduated from the University of New Mexico with her Bachelor of Arts degree in 1972 and later from University of New Mexico School of Law with a Juris Doctor in 1975. Armijo's grandfather was a well-known figure in Las Vegas, New Mexico. He served as the District Attorney and then became one of the longest serving judges in the history of New Mexico, serving in the Fourth Judicial District of New Mexico more than 35 years until his death.

== Career ==
Armijo was a staff attorney of Sandoval County Legal Services, New Mexico from 1976 to 1978 where she served, among others, indigent Native Americans. She was in private practice in New Mexico from 1978 to 1996. In 1996, Armijo was appointed by Governor Gary Johnson to the New Mexico Court of Appeals. Following her appointment, she won election to the seat, making her one of only a handful of Republicans to win a statewide judicial office in New Mexico, and the first Latina to serve as an appellate judge in New Mexico. While serving on the Court of Appeals, Judge Armijo authored more than 50 opinions and participated in many more. Judge Armijo's service on the Court of Appeals ended in November 2001 when she was appointed to the United States District Court.

=== Federal judicial career ===
In 2001, Armijo was nominated to the United States District Court for the District of New Mexico by President George W. Bush on September 4, 2001, to a new seat created by 114 Stat. 2762. Armijo was unanimously confirmed by the Senate on November 6, 2001 on a Senate vote and received her commission on November 12, 2001. She became Chief Judge of the court on October 1, 2012. As Chief Judge, she received praise for steering the court through the federal budget sequestration that struck shortly after she became chief. Under her leadership, the court also worked cooperatively to consolidate the federal bankruptcy court into the Domenici federal courthouse, reportedly saving taxpayers roughly $1 million per year. During her tenure as chief, the U.S. District Court filled eight full-time and part-time magistrate judge positions. She assumed senior status on February 7, 2018.

== See also ==
- List of Hispanic and Latino American jurists
- List of first women lawyers and judges in New Mexico

== Sources ==
Legal offices
Preceded by Seat established by 114 Stat. 2762	Judge of the United States District Court for the District of New Mexico; 2001–2018	Succeeded by Kea W. Riggs
Preceded by Bruce D. Black	Chief Judge of the United States District Court for the District of New Mexico; 2012–2018	Succeeded by William P. Johnson
