= United States District Court for the District of New Mexico =

United States federal district court of New Mexico

- (D.N.M.)
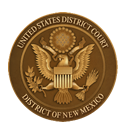

- Location: Pete V. Domenici U.S. Courthouse (Albuquerque) (Headquarters) More locations: Las Cruces; Santiago E. Campos U.S. Courthouse (Santa Fe); Albuquerque (Secondary Court)
- Appeals to: Tenth Circuit
- Established: June 20, 1910
- Judges: 7
- Chief Judge: Kenneth J. Gonzales

Officers of the court
- U.S. Attorney: Ryan Ellison (acting)
- U.S. Marshal: Sonya K. Chavez
- www.nmd.uscourts.gov

The United States District Court for the District of New Mexico (in case citations, D.N.M.) is the federal district court whose jurisdiction comprises the state of New Mexico. Court is held in Albuquerque, Las Cruces, and Santa Fe.

Appeals from the District of New Mexico are taken to the United States Court of Appeals for the Tenth Circuit (except for patent claims and claims against the U.S. government under the Tucker Act, which are appealed to the Federal Circuit).

The United States Attorney's Office for the District of New Mexico represents the United States in civil and criminal litigation in the court. The acting United States attorney is Ryan Ellison since 2025.

== Current judges ==
As of September 30, 2026:

#	Title	Judge	Duty station	Born	Term of service			Appointed by
#	Title	Judge	Duty station	Born	Active	Chief	Senior	Appointed by
22	Chief Judge	Kenneth J. Gonzales	Santa Fe	1964	2013–present	2025–present	—	Obama
23	District Judge	Kea W. Riggs	Albuquerque	1965	2019–present	—	—	Trump
24	District Judge	Margaret Strickland	Las Cruces	1980	2021–present	—	—	Biden
25	District Judge	David H. Urias	Albuquerque	1967	2022–present	—	—	Biden
26	District Judge	Matthew L. Garcia	Albuquerque	1974	2023–present	—	—	Biden
27	District Judge	Sarah M. Davenport	Las Cruces	1976	2025–present	—	—	Biden
28	District Judge	vacant	—	—	—	—	—	—
15	Senior Judge	Martha Vázquez	Santa Fe	1953	1993–2021	2003–2010	2021–present	Clinton
17	Senior Judge	Christina Armijo	inactive	1951	2001–2018	2012–2018	2018–present	G.W. Bush
19	Senior Judge	Robert C. Brack	Las Cruces	1953	2003–2018	—	2018–present	G.W. Bush
21	Senior Judge	Judith C. Herrera	Albuquerque	1954	2004–2019	—	2019–present	G.W. Bush

== Vacancies and pending nominations ==
Seat	Prior judge's duty station	Seat last held by	Vacancy reason	Date of vacancy	Nominee	Date of nomination
6	Albuquerque	James O. Browning	Senior status	February 1, 2026	–	–

== Former judges ==
#	Judge	Born–died	Active service	Chief Judge	Senior status	Appointed by	Reason for termination
1	William Hayes Pope	1870–1916	1912–1916	—	—	Taft	death
2	Colin Neblett	1875–1950	1917–1948	—	1948–1950	Wilson	death
3	Orie Leon Phillips	1885–1974	1923–1929	—	—	Harding	elevation
4	Carl Hatch	1889–1963	1949–1963	1954–1963	1963	Truman	death
5	Waldo Henry Rogers	1908–1964	1954–1964	1963–1964	—	Eisenhower	death
6	Harry Vearle Payne	1908–1983	1963–1978	1964–1978	1978–1983	Kennedy	death
7	Howard C. Bratton	1922–2002	1964–1987	1978–1987	1987–2002	L. Johnson	death
8	Edwin L. Mechem	1912–2002	1970–1982	—	1982–2002	Nixon	death
9	Santiago E. Campos	1926–2001	1978–1992	1987–1989	1992–2001	Carter	death
10	Juan Guerrero Burciaga	1929–1995	1979–1994	1989–1994	1994–1995	Carter	death
11	Bobby Baldock	1936–present	1983–1986	—	—	Reagan	elevation
12	John Edwards Conway	1934–2014	1986–2000	1994–2000	2000–2014	Reagan	death
13	James Aubrey Parker	1937–2022	1987–2003	2000–2003	2003–2022	Reagan	death
14	Curtis LeRoy Hansen	1933–2023	1992–2003	—	2003–2023	G.H.W. Bush	death
16	Bruce D. Black	1947–present	1995–2012	2010–2012	2012–2017	Clinton	retirement
18	William P. Johnson	1959–present	2001–2025	2018–2025	2025–2026	G.W. Bush	retirement
20	James O. Browning	1956–present	2003–2026	—	2026	G.W. Bush	retirement

== Chief judges ==
Chief judges have administrative responsibilities with respect to their district court. Unlike the Supreme Court, where one justice is specifically nominated to be chief, the office of chief judge rotates among the district court judges. To be chief, a judge must have been in active service on the court for at least one year, be under the age of 65, and have not previously served as chief judge.

A vacancy is filled by the judge highest in seniority among the group of qualified judges. The chief judge serves for a term of seven years, or until age 70, whichever occurs first. The age restrictions are waived if no members of the court would otherwise be qualified for the position.

When the office was created in 1948, the chief judge was the longest-serving judge who had not elected to retire, on what has since 1958 been known as senior status, or declined to serve as chief judge. After August 6, 1959, judges could not become or remain chief after turning 70 years old. The current rules have been in operation since October 1, 1982.

== Succession of seats ==
Seat 1
Seat established on January 6, 1912 by 36 Stat. 557
Pope	1912–1916
Neblett	1917–1948
Hatch	1949–1963
Payne	1963–1978
Campos	1978–1992
Vázquez	1993–2021
Urias	2022–present

Seat 2
Seat established on September 14, 1922 by 42 Stat. 837 (temporary)
Phillips	1923–1929
Seat abolished on April 29, 1929 (temporary judgeship expired)

Seat 3
Seat established on February 10, 1954 by 68 Stat. 8 (temporary)
Seat made permanent on May 19, 1961 by 75 Stat. 80
Rogers	1954–1964
Bratton	1964–1987
Parker	1987–2003
Herrera	2004–2019
Garcia	2023–present

Seat 4
Seat established on June 2, 1970 by 84 Stat. 294
Mechem	1970–1982
Baldock	1982–1985
Conway	1986–2000
Johnson	2001–2025
Davenport	2025–present

Seat 5
Seat established on October 20, 1978 by 92 Stat. 1629
Burciaga	1979–1994
Black	1995–2012
Gonzales	2013–present

Seat 6
Seat established on December 1, 1990 by 104 Stat. 5089
Hansen	1992–2003
Browning	2003–2026
vacant	2026–present

Seat 7
Seat established on December 21, 2000 by 114 Stat. 2762
Armijo	2001–2018
Riggs	2019–present

Seat 8
Seat established on November 2, 2002 by 116 Stat. 1758 (temporary)
Brack	2003–2018
Seat made permanent on December 23, 2024 by 138 Stat. 2693
Strickland	2021–present

== List of U.S. attorneys ==
- Summers Burkhart (1913–1921)
- Norman Bay (2000–2001)
- David Iglesias (2001–2006)
- Larry Gomez (2006–2008)
- Gregory J. Fouratt (2008–2010)
- Kenneth J. Gonzales (2010–2013)
- Damon Martinez (2014–2017)
- John C. Anderson (2018–2021)
- Fred Joseph Federici III (acting) (2021–2022)
- Alexander M.M. Uballez (2022–2025)
- Holland S. Kastrin (acting) 2025-

== See also ==
- Courts of New Mexico
- List of current United States district judges
- List of United States federal courthouses in New Mexico
