= Kenneth J. Gonzales =

American judge (born 1964)

Kenneth Gonzales
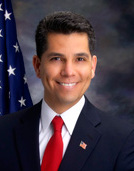

Chief Judge of the United States District Court for the District of New Mexico
- Incumbent
- Assumed office January 10, 2025
- Preceded by: William P. Johnson

Judge of the United States District Court for the District of New Mexico
- Incumbent
- Assumed office August 9, 2013
- Appointed by: Barack Obama
- Preceded by: Bruce D. Black

United States Attorney for the District of New Mexico
- In office April 30, 2010 – August 9, 2013
- Appointed by: Barack Obama
- Preceded by: Gregory J. Fouratt
- Succeeded by: Damon Martinez

Personal details
- Born: Kenneth John Gonzales; October 26, 1964 (age 61) Española, New Mexico, U.S.
- Education: University of New Mexico (BA, JD)

Military service
- Allegiance: United States
- Branch/service: United States Army
- Years of service: 2001–present
- Rank: Major
- Unit: Army Judge Advocate General's Corps

Kenneth John Gonzales (born October 26, 1964) is an American attorney who serves as the chief United States district judge of the United States District Court for the District of New Mexico and is a former United States attorney for the same district.

== Early life and education ==
Gonzales was born and raised in Española, New Mexico. He earned a Bachelor of Arts degree in 1988 from the University of New Mexico and a Juris Doctor in 1994 from the University of New Mexico School of Law. He then attended The JAG School at the University of Virginia and entered the U.S. Army JAG Corps.

== Career ==
After law school, Gonzales served as a law clerk for Chief Justice Joseph F. Baca of the New Mexico Supreme Court from 1994 to 1996. He then worked as a legislative assistant for United States Senator Jeff Bingaman from 1996 to 1999. From 1999 to 2010, he worked as an assistant United States attorney for the District of New Mexico. From 2010 to 2013, he served as United States Attorney for the District of New Mexico.

In 2001 he was commissioned as an officer in the United States Army Reserve and holds the rank of major in the Army Judge Advocate General's Corps. He is an adjunct professor of criminal law at The Judge Advocate General's Legal Center and School.

=== Federal judicial service ===
On November 14, 2012, President Barack Obama nominated Gonzales to serve as a United States district judge for the United States District Court for the District of New Mexico, to the seat vacated by Judge Bruce D. Black, who assumed senior status on October 1, 2012. On January 2, 2013, his nomination was returned to the President, due to the adjournment sine die of the Senate. On January 3, 2013, he was renominated to the same office. His nomination was reported by the Senate Judiciary Committee on April 11, 2013, by a voice vote. On June 17, 2013, the Senate confirmed his nomination by a 89–0 vote. He received his commission on August 9, 2013, and took the judicial oath the same day. He commenced judicial duties on August 12, 2013, and maintains chambers in Santa Fe, New Mexico. He became chief judge on January 10, 2025, after William P. Johnson assumed senior status.

== See also ==
- List of Hispanic and Latino American jurists

Legal offices
Preceded by Bruce D. Black	Judge of the United States District Court for the District of New Mexico; 2013–present	Incumbent
Preceded by William P. Johnson	Chief Judge of the United States District Court for the District of New Mexico; 2025–present	Incumbent
