= Alice Kahokuoluna =

Alice Rosehill Kahokuoluna
- Born: February 20, 1888; Honolulu; Kingdom of Hawaii
- Died: March 14, 1957 (aged 69); Honolulu; Territory of Hawaii
- Education: Auburn Theological Seminary; Andover Newton Theological School
- Known for: Pastor Siloama-Kanaana Hou (New Canaan) on Molokai

Alice Lillian Rosehill Kahokuoluna (February 20, 1888 – March 14, 1957) was a Congregational minister of Native Hawaiian ancestry. In her time and place, she was the first woman ordained by the Hawaiian Evangelical Association, and the only woman Christian minister in the Territory of Hawaii. Her pastorate was primarily on the Islands of Maui and Molokai, where she helped restore the Siloama Church. Her childhood and young adult church life had been at Kawaiahaʻo Church in Honolulu, and the board of directors of that church later offered her the position of Kahu (pastor).

== Background ==
She was born in Honolulu, the Kingdom of Hawaii, to Native Hawaiian mother Kuhilani Awai Kanaina (1861–1930), and Swedish sea captain father Andrew A. Rosehill (1851–1913) . Her siblings were sisters Minnie, Inez, Emma, and brothers Edward, Joseph, Francis and William. A stepbrother Frederick was from her mother's first marriage. Educated at Kaahumanu Elementary and Kawaiahaʻo Seminary for Girls, she was employed as a book binder at the Advertiser Publishing Company in Honolulu when she met Maui sheriff Peter Noa Kahokuoluna. They were married in 1912 in the home of Kahu (pastor) Henry Hodges Parker of Kawaiahaʻo Church.

== Call to the ministry ==
The Kahokuolunas were devout Christians, who kept their ties to Kawaiahaʻo Church in Honolulu. Encouraged by the church kahu (Note: "pastor, minister, reverend, or preacher of a church") Akaiko Akana, Alice attended Auburn Theological Seminary and Andover Newton Theological School. She was called in 1923 to shepherd Wananalua Congregational Church in Hana, Maui. Advocating the church as a positive factor in the community, Kahokuoluna encouraged congregational involvement in local sports activities, scouting, music and other social outlets. Although she was a licensed minister, she had never been ordained. At the request of the congregants, the Hawaiian Evangelical Association officially ordained her into the ministry in 1925, the first woman the organization had ever admitted into the clergy. She became pastor of Waineʻe Church that same year. Her husband Peter died in 1926 after a lengthy illness. When Akana died in 1933, the board of trustees of Kawaiahaʻo Church offered the position to Alice, noting that she was the only ordained woman Christian minister in Hawaii, but she did not accept the position. On December 1, 1933, Kawaiahao held a year-end "Praise Service", with Alice delivering a Hawaiian language sermon.

The Siloama Church body of Christians had been formed at Kalawao, Molokai in 1866, by exiled people afflicted with leprosy. The Hawaiian Board of Missions erected the actual building in 1871. Over the years, the building fell into disrepair, and Congregationalists erected Kanaana Hou, the Church of New Canaan, at a different Molokai location in 1915. In 1938, Alice accepted a call to be pastor of the Siloama-Kanaana Hou churches, and spearheaded a drive to raise funds and restore the old Siloama Church. While searching through the abandoned ruins, Alice and Floyd McHenry, a naturalist affiliated with the Bishop Museum, discovered a vault beneath its foundation. Therein, they found its original 1866 record book. That discovery inspired Hawaiian historian Ethel Moseley Damon to write a book on history of the church. Japan's 1941 Attack on Pearl Harbor, and the United States entry into World War II, caused a shortage of needed building supplies for the restoration effort. However, the efforts continued, and the restored Siloama was re-dedicated in 1948. Thereafter the congregants of Kanaana Hou Church worshiped at Siloama one Sunday each month.

== Final years ==
Her efforts at Molokai drew support from other churches and individuals in Hawaii. The choir she had organized participated in a congregational convention in 1951.

She never remarried or had any children of her own. For all her years of being in service to leprosy patients, she never contracted the disease herself. But by the end of her life, she was known as "Mother Alice" on Molokai for her selfless caring of others. No one who needed her was turned away, no matter the hour of the day or night. She was said to be "a Hawaiian of quiet distinction, a vigorous, understanding woman of conviction and courage, but with a saving smile in her eyes ... " Upon her 1957 death of cancer, a bronze plaque was created by Kanaana Hou Church to commemorate her life's service.

== Sources ==
- Law, Anwei Skinsnes (2012). Kalaupapa: A Collective Memory. University of Hawai'i Press. pp. 36, 442. ISBN 9780824865801.
