= Edward Kahale =

Rev. Edward Kahale

Edward Kahale (1891 – 1989) was an American clergyman, and the third Kahu (pastor) of Hawaiian ancestry at Kawaiahaʻo Church, from January 1940 until the January 1957 installation of Abraham Akaka. He was an integral part of the University of Hawaii's early 20th century efforts to prevent the Hawaiian language from becoming a lost language.

== Background ==
He was born of Hawaiian ancestry in Honolulu on September 19, 1891, and raised in Kau, Hawaii by his parents Harry and Ana Ohialau Kahale. He trained as an accountant through a correspondence course with La Salle Extension University, and was also a Graduate of the Bible Institute of Los Angeles. For a number of years, he was a school teacher on the island of Niihau, and was jokingly referred to as "the mayor of Niihau".

== Ministry ==
He had pastored, or served as assistant pastor, at several churches in the Territory of Hawaii, including Kaneohe, Napoopoo, Waianae and Pearl City. Kahale was pastor of Haili Church in Hilo in 1937, when he was called to be assistant pastor at Kawaiahaʻo Church, sharing the leadership responsibilities with Kahu William Kamau . Kahale was promoted to Kahu in 1940, and became the third of Hawaiian ancestry. The 89-year-old Kamau was able to retire as pastor emeritus.

In April 1945, Kahale officiated at the funeral service for political leader and Hawaiian Princess Abigail Campbell Kawānanakoa. Kahale served Kawaiahaʻo until Reverend Abraham Akaka was installed as Kahu on January 30, 1957. Although officially retired, he was still affiliated with Kawaiahaʻo, mostly officiating at weddings and funerals. One of his last rites as a minister was officiating at the 1973 wedding of Honolulu Advertiser columnist Sammy Amalu and realtor Ann Felzer.

== Saving the Hawaiian language ==
The annexation of Hawaii by the United States was followed by a move towards cultural Americanization of the territory. Conversational Hawaiian gradually declined almost to the point of extinction. The situation was exacerbated when the territorial government favored English-only in classrooms. The University of Hawaii instituted a program to rectify the situation. Hawaiian language interpreter and instructor Frederick William Kahapula Beckley Jr. was hired in 1922 as the university's first Hawaiian language instructor. John Henry Wise became the second instructor in 1926.

Wise died in 1937, and was succeeded by Henry Pratt Judd, grandson of missionary Gerrit P. Judd. When Judd retired in 1945, Kahale was brought on board. The trustees of Kawaiahaʻo Church accommodated his need to divide his time between the church and the university. Beginning in 1946, Kahale created the lesson textbooks. In 1949, linguist Samuel Hoyt Elbert, who had been taught the language by Mary Kawena Pukui, was hired to assist Kahale as a teacher. The instructors would come to include Reverend Samuel Aukai Keala Sr. of Kaumakapili Church, a native Hawaiian minister who was raised in a home where only the Hawaiian language was spoken.

Beginning in 1950, Kahale delivered Hawaiian language sermons on Honolulu radio station KGMB. His last transmission was December 31, 1951.

Textbooks authored

- A course in elementary Hawaiian for the University of Hawaii non-credit evening session. 1946. OCLC 663709713.
- Hawaiian language: first year. 1950. OCLC 663416099.
- Hawaiian language. 1st-2d year. 1950s. OCLC 16335711.
- Hawaiian language. 1950s. OCLC 907505061.
- Hawaiian language. 1953. OCLC 663373786.

KGMB radio sermons 1950-1951

- Nu maikai: [sermons] (in Hawaiian). 1973. OCLC 16341795.
