= William Kamau =

- Rev. William Kamau
- Born: William Kamau; January 15, 1851; Waiehu, Maui, Hawaii, U.S.
- Died: January 9, 1944 (aged 92)
- Education: Lahainaluna High School and the Mid-Pacific Institute
- Spouses: Nawaiotua Kahoowaiwai; Martha Haili Timoteo
- Relatives: Martha Haili Timoteo, Anee K. Kamau and William K. Kamau

William Kamau (January 15, 1851 – January 9, 1944) was an American clergyman, and the second Kahu (shepherd) of Hawaiian ancestry at Kawaiahaʻo Church in Honolulu, Hawaii.

== Background ==
He was born on Maui in the district of Waiehu, attending both Lahainaluna High School and the Mid-Pacific Institute in Honolulu. Much of his adulthood was spent on the island of Hawaii, where he was ordained into the ministry. His first pastorate was at Kalapana, Hawaii. Affiliated with the Hawaii Mission Board, Kamau was also a judge who served as a district magistrate at Puna at the same time he pastored a church at Opihikao. He served in a ministerial capacity at the Lihue Hawaiian Church on Kauai, the Ewa Congregational Church at Pearl City on Oahu, and Mānana Protestant Church. For more than two decades, he served as chaplain in the Territory of Hawaii legislature.

== Kawaiahao ==
After Rev. Akaiko Akana died on February 16, 1933, Kawaiahao took 15 months to find a successor. In the interim, the duties of the position were shared among the deacons. Kamau had an affiliation with Haili Church in Hilo, and along with other ministers in the islands, sometimes participated in larger events with Kawaiahao. He accepted the call to shepherd the church, and was installed as Kahu on June 10, 1934. Kamau was 83 years old when he accepted the position, the same age Henry Hodges Parker had been when he retired from his ministry at Kawaiahao.

Kamau officiated at the church entirely in the Hawaiian language. Edward Kahale was associate pastor. At the end of 1939, Kamau was the oldest practicing ordained minister in the territory. When Kahale was promoted to Kahu in 1940, Kamau was put on retirement as pastor emeritus allowing him to continue as a practicing minister without the responsibilities of administration.

== Personal life ==
He married Nawaiotua Kahoowaiwai in 1888. She was the mother of his children: county engineer, Samuel H. Kamau, teacher Anna K. Hoopii, school administrator Mrs. Lakana K. d'Aguilar, teacher Maria K. Todd and teacher Anee K. Kamau and Territorial representative William K. Kamau. She died October 30, 1916.

On May 30, 1919, he married Martha Haili Timoteo. They had no children. Rev. Kamau died January 9, 1944. Martha Kamau died in 1958.
