= Lunalilo Mausoleum =

Mausoleum in Hawaii

Coordinates: 21°18′17″N 157°51′30″W

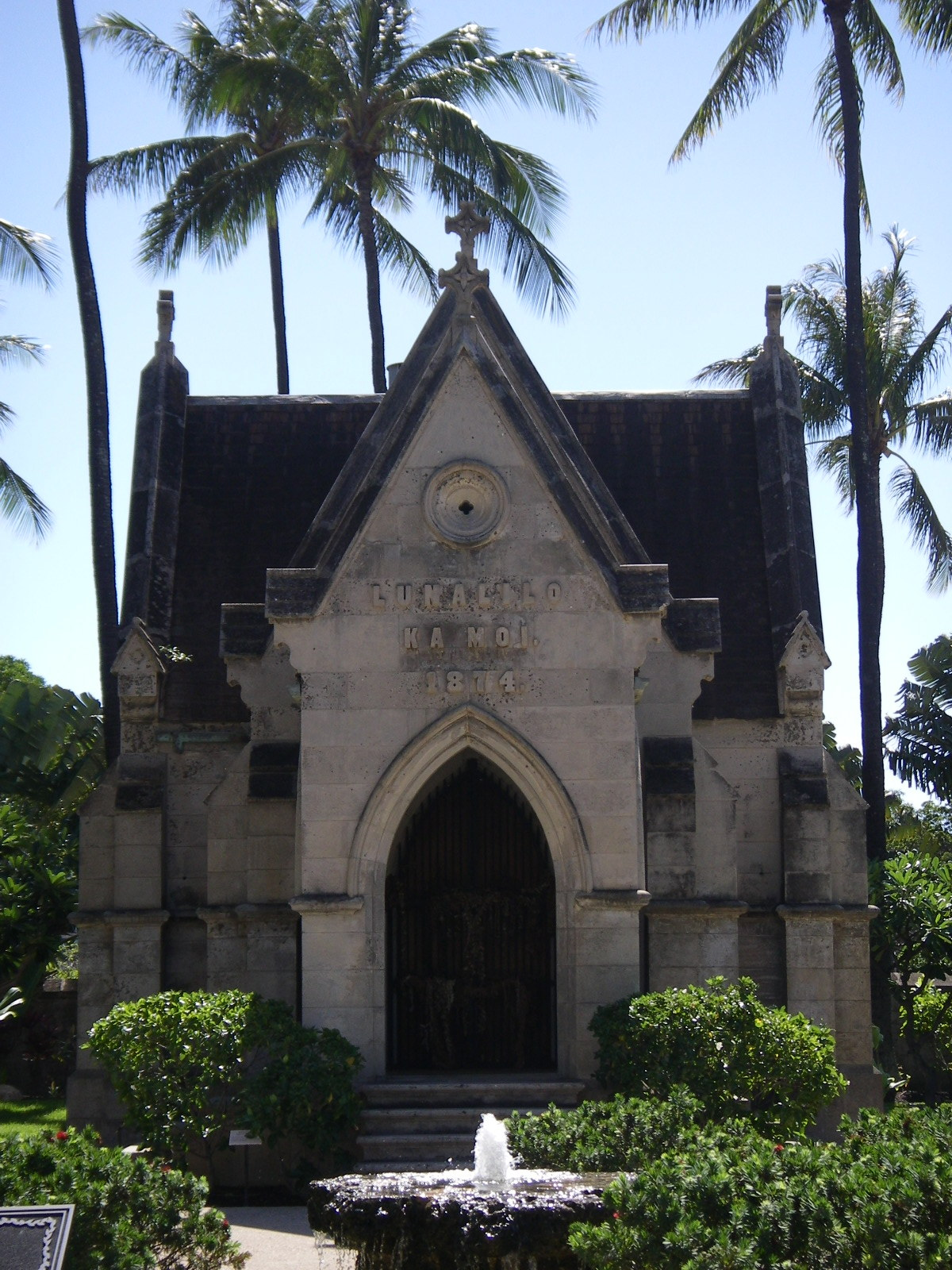
- King Lunalilo's Mausoleum
- Interactive map of Lunalilo Mausoleum

Details
- Established: 1876
- Type: Mausoleum

The Lunalilo Mausoleum (also called Lunalilo's Tomb) is the final resting place of Hawaii's sixth monarch King Lunalilo and his father Charles Kanaʻina on the ground of the Kawaiahaʻo Church, in Downtown Honolulu on the Hawaiian Island of Oʻahu.

== History ==
Lunalilo died from tuberculosis on February 3, 1874, after a short reign of a year. On his deathbed, Lunalilo had requested a burial at Kawaiahaʻo Church on the church's ground instead of Royal Mausoleum at Mauna ʻAla in Nuʻuanu Valley, the burial site of most modern Hawaiian monarchs. Historians have speculated that the democratically elected king wanted to be buried in the cemetery to be closer to the common people. Another reasoning for his refusal to be buried alongside his predecessors was rooted in a feud between Lunalilo and the Kamehameha family over his mother Kekāuluohi's exclusion from the list of royalty to be buried there in the 1860s. Kekāuluohi's remains were buried at sea by Lunalilo.

After his state funeral in 1874, Lunalilo's remains were temporarily interred at the Royal Mausoleum at Mauna ʻAla, awaiting the completion of the Lunalilo Mausoleum. The tomb was built under the instructions of his father Charles Kanaʻina, who survived him. Robert Lishman, an Englishman from Australia, designed and supervised the construction. On November 23, 1875, his remains were taken from the Royal Mausoleum to the almost completed tomb on the grounds of Kawaiahaʻo Church. His father requested a second funeral and a 21-gun salute from King Kalākaua like during the first royal funeral. Kalākaua granted the second funeral but refused to allow the 21-gun salute. During this procession, eyewitness reports stated that a sudden storm arose, and that twenty-one rapid thunderclaps echoed across Honolulu which came to be known as the "21-gun salute."

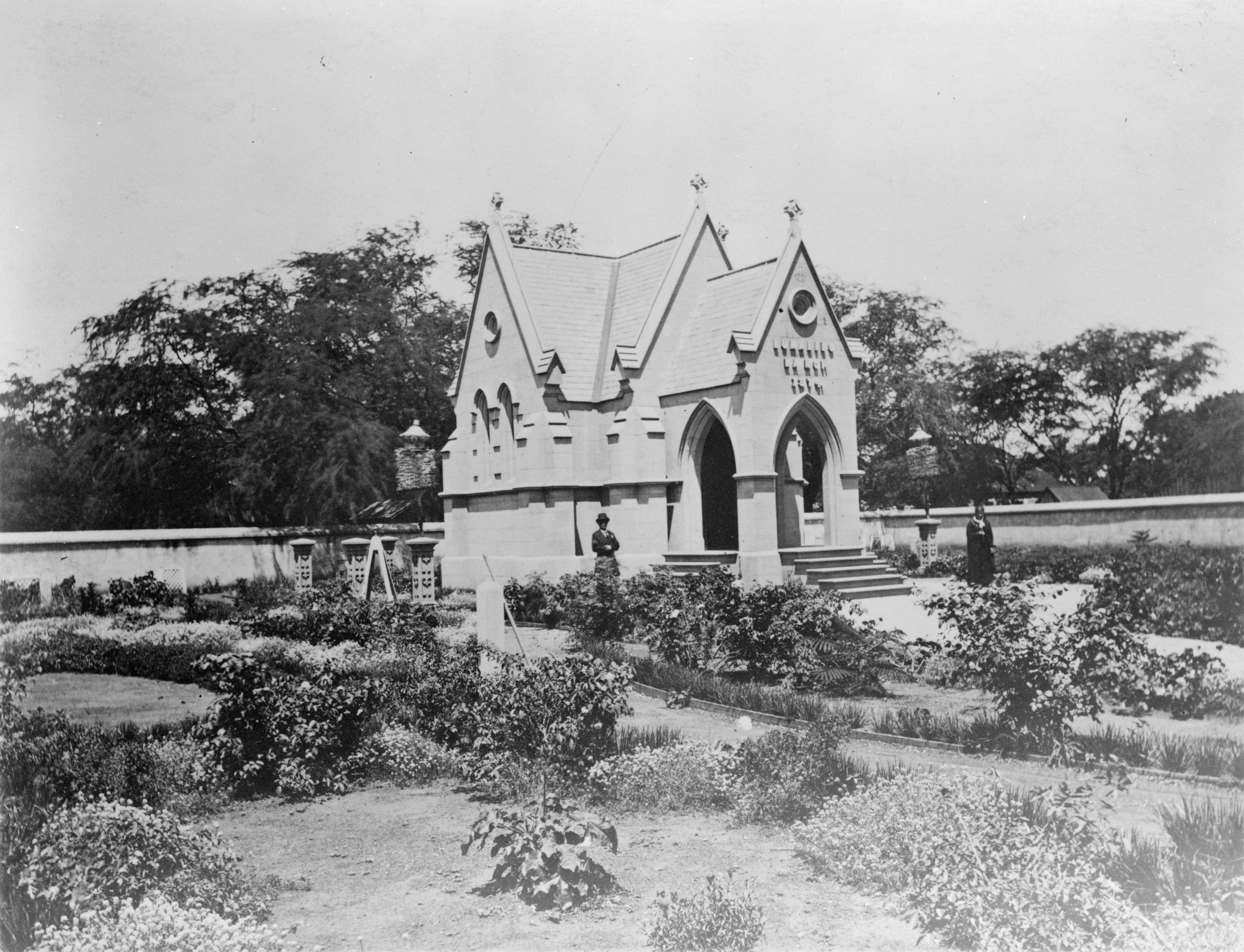
The Mausoleum in the 19th-century

The tomb was completed in 1876. His father Charles Kanaʻina was buried in the vault after his death in 1877. A maternal cousin of Lunalilo Miriam Auhea Kekāuluohi Crowningburg served as kahu (caretaker) for the mausoleum until her death in 1899. In acknowledgement of her chiefly status, she was buried in the lot outside the vault of Lunalilo's Mausoleum. Her grandson William Bishop Taylor, who served as kahu for the Royal Mausoleum at Mauna ʻAla, would also later be buried within the same lot.

The interior of the Mausoleum contains the two koa wood caskets of Lunalilo and his father on red-carpeted floors. Three kāhili encased in Italian marble are set near the caskets. In 1917, Albert Gergbode and Paul Payne, two American naval sailors, broke into the tomb in search of burial goods and stole a silver crown and a silver plate inscribed with the biography of Lunalilo. The culprits melted down the silver objects and tried to pawn it in Key West, Florida, where they were arrested for the crime.

=== Interments ===
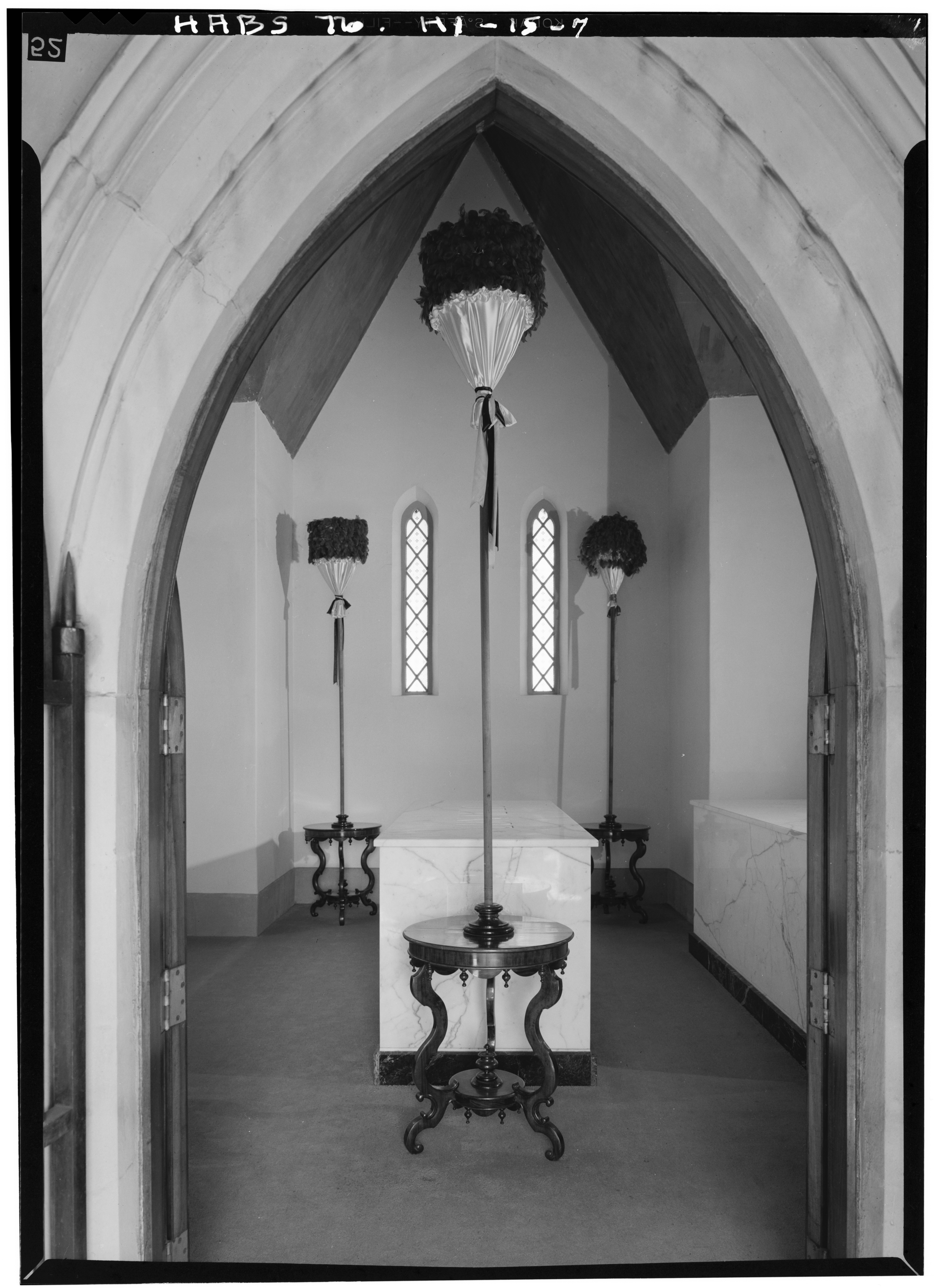
Interior of Lunalilo Mausoleum with Lunalilo's sarcophagus center and Kanaʻina's to the right

- Lunalilo (1835–1874), sixth monarch of the Kingdom of Hawaii
- Charles Kanaʻina (1801–1877), father of Lunalilo
- Miriam Auhea Kekāuluohi Crowningburg (1839–1899), cousin of Lunalio, buried outside the tomb
- William Edward Bishop Kaiheʻekai Taylor (1882–1956), grandson of Crowningburg, buried outside the tomb

== See also ==
- Royal Mausoleum of Hawaii
  - List of burials in the Royal Mausoleum of Hawaii

== Bibliography ==
- Budnick, Rich (2005). Hawaii's Forgotten History: 1900–1999: The Good...The Bad...The Embarrassing. Honolulu: Aloha Press. ISBN 978-0-944081-04-4. OCLC 70179824.
- Galuteria, Peter; Burningham, Robin Yoko (1993). Lunalilo (Revised ed.). Honolulu: Kamehameha Schools/Bernice Pauahi Bishop Estate. ISBN 978-0-87336-019-7. OCLC 32857010.
- Judd, Walter F. (1975). Palaces and Forts of the Hawaiian Kingdom: From Thatch to American Florentine. Palo Alto, Calif: Pacific Books, Publishers. ISBN 978-0-87015-216-0. OCLC 2073825.
- Kuykendall, Ralph Simpson (1953). The Hawaiian Kingdom 1854–1874, Twenty Critical Years. Vol. 2. Honolulu: University of Hawaii Press. ISBN 978-0-87022-432-4. OCLC 47010821.
- Withington, Antoinette (1937). Hawaiian Tapestry. New York: Harper & Brothers. OCLC 411607.
- Young, Kanalu G. Terry (1998). Rethinking the Native Hawaiian Past. New York: Garland Publishing. ISBN 978-0-8153-3120-9. OCLC 0815331207.
