= Miriam Auhea Kekāuluohi Crowningburg =

High chiefess during the Kingdom of Hawaiʻi (c. 1839–1899)

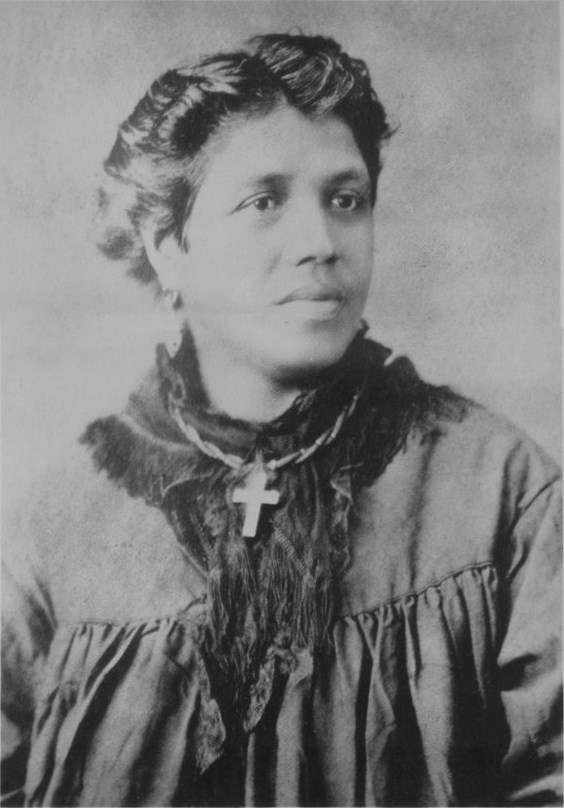
- Born: 1839
- Died: May 16, 1899 (age 60); Honolulu, Oahu, Territory of Hawaii
- Burial: May 17, 1899; Lunalilo Family Plot, Kawaiahaʻo Church
- Spouse: Jesse Crowningburg; Paul Kamai
- Issue: William Charles Keʻeaumoku Crowningburg; Elizabeth Keomailani Crowningburg Taylor; Albert Edward Kameeiamoku Kamai
Names
- Miriam Auhea Kekāuluohi Crowningburg Kamai
- Father: Kaiheʻekai
- Mother: Namahana

Miriam Auhea Kekāuluohi Crowningburg Kamai (c. 1839–1899) was a Hawaiian high chiefess (aliʻi) during the Hawaiian Kingdom. She was a cousin of King Lunalilo and namesake of his mother Kekāuluohi who ruled as Kuhina Nui (premier) under Kamehameha III.

A collateral relation of the House of Kamehameha, she was connected to the ruling family of the Hawaiian Kingdom from her cousin to King Lunalilo to his successors King Kalakaua and Queen Liliʻuokalani. She married firstly German-American Jesse Crowningburg and later Paul Kamai. Auhea became the kahu (caretaker or guardian) of the Lunalilo Mausoleum, her cousin's personal family tomb on the grounds of the Kawaiahaʻo Church. She witnessed the overthrow of the Hawaiian Kingdom in 1893, the establishment of the Republic of Hawaii in 1894 and finally Hawaii's annexation to the United States in 1898. Auhea died on May 16, 1899, and was buried next to her cousin on the grounds of the Lunalilo Mausoleum. Her descendants have traditionally held the position of kahu of the Royal Mausoleum at Mauna ʻAla.

== Ancestry ==
Born in 1839, Auhea's parents were the High Chief John Harold Kaiheʻekai and High Chiefess Namahana, from the aliʻi (nobility) class. Kaiheʻekai was the son of Hoʻolulu, son of Kameʻeiamoku, one of the royal twins (with Kamanawa) who advised Kamehameha I in his conquest of the Hawaiian Islands. Hoʻolulu and his brother Hoapili were chosen to conceal the bones of King Kamehameha I in a secret hiding place after his death and her family have become the traditional kahu (guardians) of the royal burial sites. Kaiheʻekai's mother was Charlotte Halaki Cox, whose father lent his name to Keʻeaumoku II, the Governor of Maui. Through her great-grandfather Captain Harold Cox, (Note: Mrs. Almira Hollander Pitman claimed Captain Cox was an American while Sammy Amalu stated he was an Englishman.) Auhea was either one-eighth English or American descent. Her mother Namahana was the daughter of Peleuli, daughter of High Chief Kalaʻimamahu, half-brother of Kamehameha I. Her grandmother was the half-sister of Miriam Auhea Kekāuluohi, who ruled as Kuhina Nui of the Hawaiian Kingdom under Kamehameha III from 1839 to 1845, making the younger Auhea a second cousin of King Lunalilo. It was alleged that she was betrothed to Lunalilo but eloped instead with Jesse Crowningburg. After Lunalilo's death during his short reign as King, Auhea was considered to have a claim to the throne herself. In fact, her descent from a collateral line of the House of Kamehameha made her granddaughters possible claimants to the Crown Lands of Hawaii during the Hawaiian Territorial days.

== Later life and death ==
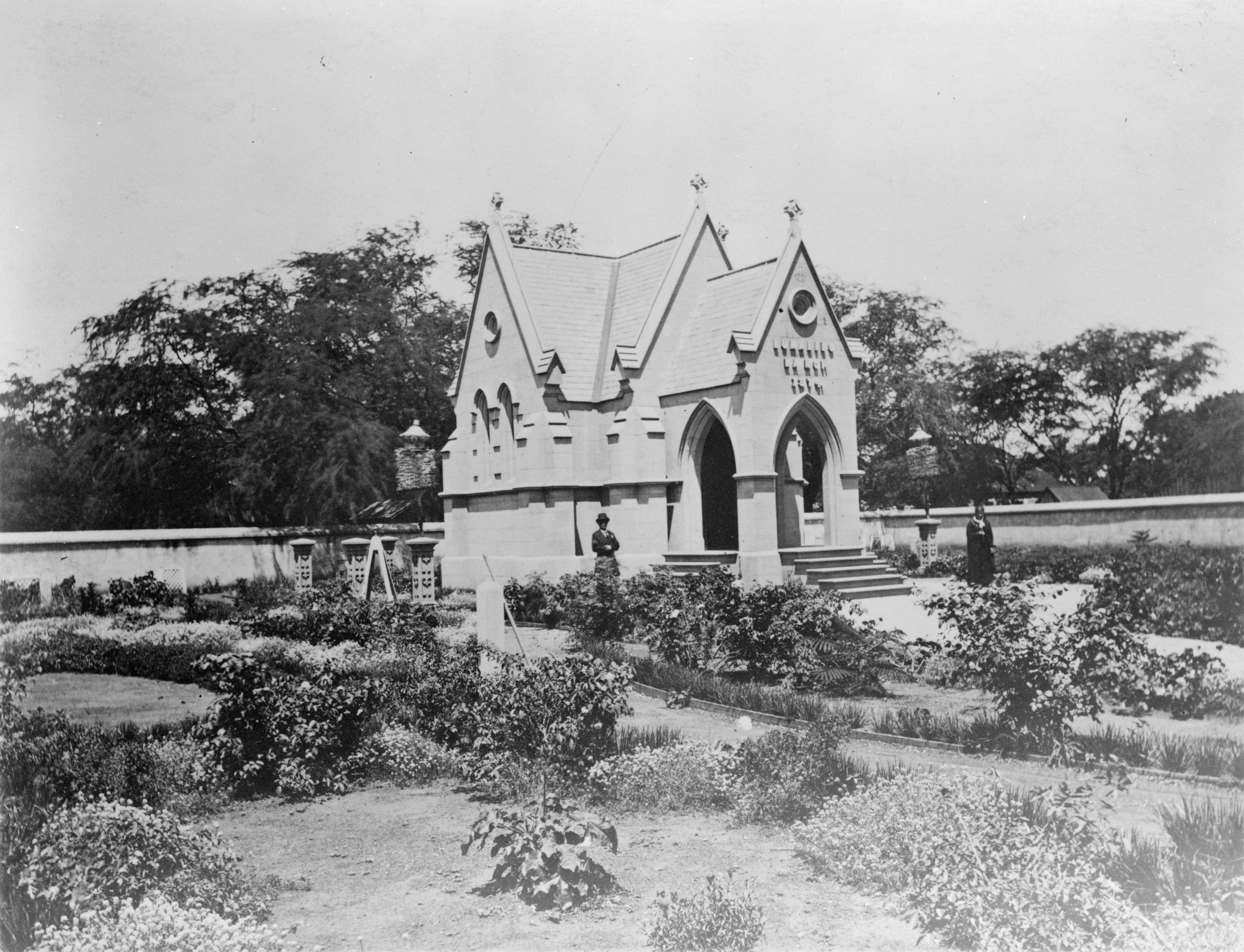
A general view of the grounds of the Lunalilo Mausoleum in the late nineteenth century

After the death of her cousin Lunalilo, Kalākaua was elected as the new Hawaiian monarch in 1874. The new king and Auhea shared a common ancestor in Kameʻeiamoku. However, from the start, Kalākaua and his siblings were openly challenged by Hawaiians loyal to Queen Emma, the widow of Kamehameha IV and a collateral descendant of the Kamehamehas in her own right. Wishing to quiet oppositions in the Hawaiian community to the new reigning family in regards to their genealogy, Auhea along with Ruth Keʻelikōlani openly acknowledged the House of Kalākaua.

In later life, Auhea became the kahu (caretaker or guardian) of the Lunalilo Mausoleum, her cousin's personal family tomb on the grounds of the Kawaiahaʻo Church. The aging chiefess witnessed the 1893 overthrow of the Hawaiian Kingdom with Queen Liliʻuokalani, the establishment of the Republic of Hawaii in 1894 and finally Hawaii's annexation to the United States in 1898. Auhea died in Honolulu on May 16, 1899. In acknowledgement of her chiefly status, she was buried in the lot outside the vault of Lunalilo's Mausoleum. Her grandson William Bishop Taylor is also buried near the mausoleum. After her death, her cousin High Chiefess Maria Beckley Kahea, the kahu of Mauna ʻAla since 1893 and another scion of the Hoʻolulu line, replaced her as kahu of the Lunalilo Mausoleum. Hoʻolulu Street, near Kapahulu, Honolulu, was named by Auhea after her ancestor.

== Marriage and descendants ==
Auhea married Jesse Crowningburg (a German-American settler in Hawaii), sometime before 1859. (Note: Sources varied on her husband's name also calling him William Issac Jesse Crowningburg and often spelling his last name as Croninberg or Crowninberg or Crowninburg.) He served as the tax collector for Lahaina and Wailuku on Maui. They had three children: William Charles Keʻeaumoku Crowningburg (died 1881) and Elizabeth Keomailani Crowningburg (1859–1887). Another daughter Lydia Kalola died at Lahaina on November 21, 1859, at the age of eight months and twenty-seven days. Their marriage ended in divorce. On January 20, 1873, she remarried to Paul Kamai, a maternal uncle of Helen Manaiula Lewis Isenberg and her half-sister Abigail Kuaihelani Campbell. They had a son named Albert Edward Kameeiamoku Kamai or Charles Harold Kameeiamoku-Kaiheekai, who died young.

Auhea's descendants survive today through her first two children. Her maternal grandson William Edward Bishop Kaiheʻekai Taylor (1882–1956), who Bernice Pauahi Bishop unsuccessful attempted to hānai (adopt), would later serve as a trustee for the Lunalilo Home. Taylor would succeed the Kaheas', descendants of Auhea's aunt Kahinu-o-Kekuaokalani Beckley, as the kahu (caretaker) of the Royal Mausoleum at Mauna ʻAla in 1947, serving till his death. All subsequent kahu of Mauna ʻAla have been descendants of Auhea and her ancestor Hoʻolulu except for Taylor's widow and Hawaiian kumu hula ʻIolani Luahine.

Her most controversial descendant is her great-great-great-grandson Sammy Amalu (1917–1986), a longtime columnist at The Honolulu Advertiser. Amalu was described as a con man by Craig Gima of the Honolulu Star-Bulletin editorial staff. A self-proclaimed royal, who titled himself High Chief Kapiikauinamoku, Prince of Keawe and Duke of Konigsberg, he attempted to buy up several Waikiki hotels with phony checks in the 1940s and ended up in jail. Under the alias Kapiikauinamoku, he later wrote "The Story of Hawaiian Royalty" and "The Story of Maui Royalty," in a series of columns written for The Honolulu Advertiser, which accounts much of the genealogy of Hawaii's aliʻi families including his ancestress Auhea.

== Bibliography ==
- Allen, Helena G. (1995). Kalakaua: Renaissance King. Honolulu: Mutual Publishing. ISBN 978-1-56647-059-9. OCLC 35083815.
- Barrere, Dorothy B. (1994). "KAIHEEKAI, JOHN HOOLULU LCA 7711" (PDF). The King's Mahele: The Awardees and Their Lands. pp. 142–144. OCLC 31886789. Archived (PDF) from the original on June 7, 2014.
- Hilleary, Perry Edward; Judd, Henry Pratt (1954). Men and Women of Hawaii, 1954. Honolulu: Honolulu Business Consultants. OCLC 15484791.
- Kanahele, George S. (2002) [1986]. Pauahi: The Kamehameha Legacy. Honolulu: Kamehameha Schools Press. ISBN 978-0-87336-005-0. OCLC 173653971.
- Kurrus, Ted (1998). Dyke, Bob (ed.). Sammy Amalu King of the Charismatic Con Men. Honolulu: University of Hawaii Press. pp. 170–180. ISBN 978-0-8248-1984-2. OCLC 249244077.
- McKinzie, Edith Kawelohea (1983). Stagner, Ishmael W. (ed.). Hawaiian Genealogies: Extracted from Hawaiian Language Newspapers. Vol. 1. Honolulu: University of Hawaii Press. ISBN 0-939154-28-5. OCLC 12555087.
- Moblo, Pennie (June 1999). "Ethnic Intercession: Leadership at the Kalaupapa Leprosy Colony". Pacific Studies. 22 (2). Laie, HI: Brigham Young University: 27–69. OCLC 882697672.
- Mulholland, John (1970). Hawaii's Religions. Rutland, VT: Tuttle Publishing. ISBN 978-1-4629-1253-7. OCLC 849947604.
- Parker, David "Kawika" (2008). "Crypts of the Ali`i The Last Refuge of the Hawaiian Royalty". Tales of Our Hawaiʻi (PDF). Honolulu: Alu Like, Inc. OCLC 309392477. Archived from the original (PDF) on November 11, 2013.
- Pitman, Almira Hollander (1931). After Fifty Years: An Appreciation, and a Record of a Unique Incident. Norwood, MA: Priv. print., The Plimpton Press. OCLC 3703871.
- Pukui, Mary Kawena; Elbert, Samuel H.; Mookini, Esther T. (1974). Place Names of Hawaii. Honolulu: University of Hawaii Press. p. 52. ISBN 978-0-8248-0524-1. OCLC 1042464.

Newspapers and online sources

- Apgar, Sally (March 5, 2006). "Mai'ohos feel drawn to royal burial site – Six generations have cared for the Nuuanu mausoleum for Hawaii's kings". Honolulu Star Bulletin. Archived from the original on August 8, 2010.
- Gima, Craig (September 16, 1998). "Whatever Happened ... Notorious Sammy Amalu died in 1986". Honolulu Star Bulletin. Archived from the original on March 1, 2016.
- Kapiikauinamoku (December 11, 1955). "Namahana III Assumes Commemorative Title – The Story of Hawaiian Royalty". The Honolulu Advertiser. Honolulu. p. 39.
- Kapiikauinamoku (December 11, 1955). "Chiefess Recognizes Exalted Birth of Kaiulani – Song of Eternity". The Honolulu Advertiser. Honolulu. p. 60.
- Kapiikauinamoku (June 21, 1956). "Peleuli II Brought Up In Kamehamehaʻs Court – The Story of Maui Royalty". The Honolulu Advertiser. Honolulu. p. 18.
- Kapiikauinamoku (June 22, 1956). "Rank of Nine Persons Causes Much Dissension – The Story of Maui Royalty". The Honolulu Advertiser. Honolulu. p. 12.
- Kapiikauinamoku (June 25, 1956). "Recognition of Kalakaua Refused by Aristocracy – The Story of Maui Royalty". The Honolulu Advertiser. Honolulu. p. 20.
- Krauss, Bob (October 16, 2002). "Dusting off tidbits from files". Honolulu Star-Advertiser. Honolulu: Oahu Publications, Inc. Archived from the original on August 13, 2016.
- "Mookuauhau Alii – Na Iwikuamoo o Hawaii Nei Mai Kahiko Mai" (PDF). Ka Makaainana. Vol. VI, no. 5. Honolulu. August 3, 1896. p. 2. Archived (PDF) from the original on March 4, 2016.
- Soboleski, Hank (November 3, 2013). "Hawaii con man and newspaper columnist Sammy Amalu". The Garden Island. Archived from the original on November 6, 2013.
- "By Authority". The Polynesian. Vol. XVI, no. 17. Honolulu. August 27, 1859. p. 3. Archived from the original on June 1, 2016.
- "By Authority. Appointments of Tax Collectors". The Polynesian. Vol. XVII, no. 17. Honolulu. August 18, 1860. p. 3. Archived from the original on March 7, 2016.
- "By Authority. Appointments of Tax Collectors". The Polynesian. Vol. XVIII, no. 19. Honolulu. September 7, 1861. p. 3. Archived from the original on February 21, 2016.
- "By Authority. List of Tax Collectors for 1862". The Polynesian. Vol. XIX, no. 21. Honolulu. September 20, 1862. p. 2. Archived from the original on March 6, 2016.
- "Died". The Pacific Commercial Advertiser. Honolulu. November 24, 1859. p. 2. Archived from the original on May 28, 2017.
- "Death of Mrs. Wray Taylor". The Pacific Commercial Advertiser. Honolulu. August 4, 1887. p. 3. Archived from the original on December 7, 2015.
- "Funeral of Mrs. Wray Taylor". The Hawaiian Gazette. Honolulu. August 9, 1887. p. 5. Archived from the original on December 7, 2015.
- "Claims of Wray Taylor's Children". The Pacific Commercial Advertiser. Honolulu. June 29, 1900. p. 2. Archived from the original on March 6, 2016.
- "The Late Chiefess". The Independent. Honolulu. May 18, 1899. p. 2. Archived from the original on December 10, 2015.
- "Died". The Independent. Honolulu. May 17, 1899. p. 3. Archived from the original on December 11, 2015.
- "Death of an Alii". The Independent. Honolulu. May 17, 1899. p. 2. Archived from the original on December 11, 2015.
- "Died". The Pacific Commercial Advertiser. Honolulu. May 17, 1899. p. 12. Archived from the original on December 11, 2015.
- "Died". The Hawaiian Gazette. Honolulu. May 19, 1899. p. 8. Archived from the original on December 11, 2015.
- "Died". The Hawaiian Star. Honolulu. May 17, 1899. p. 3. Archived from the original on December 11, 2015.
- "Local Brevities". The Pacific Commercial Advertiser. Honolulu. May 18, 1899. p. 11. Archived from the original on December 11, 2015.
- "Funeral of the Chiefess Auhea". Evening Bulletin. Honolulu. May 18, 1899. p. 1. Archived from the original on May 10, 2017.
- "The Body Not Stolen – King Lunalilo's Tomb Has Not Been Rifled". The Hawaiian Star. Honolulu. June 16, 1899. p. 1. Archived from the original on December 10, 2015.
