= Henry Hodges Parker =

Pastor in Honolulu (1834–1927)

Rev. Henry Hodges Parker
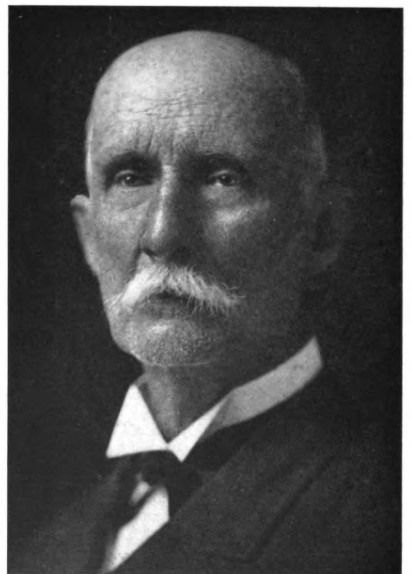
- Born: March 2, 1834; Nuku Hiva; Marquesas Islands
- Died: September 7, 1927 (aged 93); Honolulu; Territory of Hawaii
- Resting place: Mission Cemetery at Kawaiahaʻo Church
- Education: Royal School; Punahou School
- Known for: Fourth Kahu (pastor) of Kawaiahaʻo Church

Henry Hodges Parker (March 2, 1834 – September 7, 1927) was the fourth Kahu (pastor) of Kawaiahaʻo Church in Honolulu. He served in that position 54 years, the longest of any Kahu in its history. Fluent in the Hawaiian language, he was a friend and pastor to Native Hawaiians, which included several decades of the Hawaiian monarchy.

== Background ==
Born March 2, 1834, in Nuku Hiva, Marquesas Islands, he was the oldest of four children, and the only son, of missionaries Benjamin Wyman Parker (1803–1877) and Mary Elizabeth Barker Parker (1805–1907). They were part of the Sixth Company of the American Board of Commissioners for Foreign Missions that had been sent to Nuku Hiva in 1833. The island was under civil unrest at the time, and the mission was aborted within months. The missionaries arrived back in Honolulu on May 12, 1834.

The Parkers were assigned to Kaneohe, where Henry and his sisters Mary, Harriet and Caroline grew up. He studied at the Royal School under the tutelage of Edward Griffin Beckwith, and later was enrolled in classes at Punahou School under Daniel Dole and William Harrison Rice. After graduation, he spent two years as an instructor at Lahainaluna High School on Maui.

== Ministry ==
The current Kawaiahaʻo Church was constructed between 1836 and 1842. The church as a congregation had existed since Hiram Bingham arrived in 1820, and began meetings adjacent to his thatched hut. Other replacement structures were built in the same location before the stone church was erected, and had been a church home for royalty since Queen Kaʻahumanu accepted Christianity in 1824. Various names for the church have included "the Stone Church", "First Native Hawaiian church", "the Mission Church", "the Native Church" and "the First Native Church at Kawaihao in Honolulu".

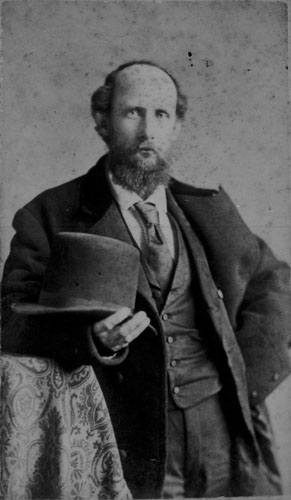
Parker in 1876

Known to Hawaiians as "Paleka opio" (the younger Parker), he grew up fluent in the Hawaiian language. Parker was trained in the ministry as an associate pastor at Kawaiahaʻo Church under Rev. Ephraim Weston Clark, who was working on an updated version of the Hawaiian Bible. When Clark resigned from the pulpit to pursue that goal, Parker was ordained as Kahu (pastor) of Kawaiahaʻo Church on June 28, 1863. The Pacific Commercial Advertiser commented on his ordination, "His perfect acquisition of the native language, and the rare faculty he possesses of rendering foreign ideas and sentiments clear, attractive and intelligible to the native mind, has made him a popular speaker with them, and we hope he may prove equally useful as a pastor." Kamehameha V, the last Aliʻi to reign under that name, looked favorably upon missionaries, and his viewpoint was that Parker's motivations were towards the well- being of the Hawaiian people.

King Lunalilo's 1873 coronation took place in Kawaiahaʻo Church, with Parker offering the opening prayer at the ceremony. When Lunalilo died in 1874, Parker officiated in the Hawaiian language at the funeral service in ʻIolani Palace. Although Queen Emma had helped establish the Church of Hawaii, upon her 1885 death, King Kalākaua requested Parker deliver the Hawaiian language eulogy at her funeral. Kalākaua was also a member of the Church of Hawaii; and while Parker did not deliver his eulogy, he was among the members of the official clergy representation at the funeral. When Hawaii's last monarch Liliʻuokalani died in 1917, Parker and Leopold Kroll of the Cathedral Church of Saint Andrew were notified so church bells could toll 79 times, her age at death. Her body lay in state at Kawaiahaʻo Church. Parker delivered the Hawaiian language eulogy at her funeral.

A celebration of his ministerial role was held at Kawaiahaʻo on the 40th anniversary of his ordination. Very little mention was made of the royalty he had ministered to, but it was rather a recognition of his labors to hundreds of congregants who received his services over the decades.

== Retirement and final years ==
In 1912, he performed the marriage of his congregant Alice Rosehill to Maui sheriff Peter Noa Kahokuoluna . The ceremony took place in Parker's home. A few years later, Alice would become the first woman minister ordained by the Hawaiian Evangelical Association and, during her life, the only woman minister of the gospel in the Territory of Hawaii.

Parker retired as an active minister on January 27, 1918, five months short of 55 years as pastor of Kawaiahaʻo Church. His last act as their Kahu was to baptize two babies. Akaiko Akana was called to succeed Parker in the pulpit.

He devoted the next several years of his life to revising A Dictionary of the Hawaiian Language, originally published in 1865 by Hawaii Supreme Court judge Lorrin Andrews. Reviewer Herbert W. Williams in 1926 did not see the publication as an improvement over the original. However, historian Ethel Moseley Damon noted in 1945 that Parker's revised edition was still used as a standard.

Parker never married. When he died in 1927 at age 93, his sister Harriet was the only remaining member of his immediate family. His father, Benjamin, died March 23, 1877, and was the first of the family to be buried in the Mission Cemetery at Kawaiahaʻo. His mother lived to age 102, dying in 1907. Sisters Mary and Caroline both died in 1925. All were buried in the Mission Cemetery, except for his sister Harriet who was buried at Kawaiahaʻo Church Cemetery after her 1929 death.

== Bibliography ==
- Board of Trustees (1866). Catalogue of the Teachers and Pupils of Punahou School and Oahu College for Twenty-five Years, Ending 1866, with An Account of the Quarter Century Celebration Held at Punahou June 15th, 1866. Printed by H.M. Whitney. pp. 11, 14.
- Damon, Ethel M. (1945). The Stone Church at Kawaiahao, 1820-1944. Trustees of Kawaiahao Church – via HathiTrust.
- Hawaiian Mission Children's Society (1901). American Protestant Missionaries to Hawaii. Hawaiian Mission Children's Society. pp. 44, 47, 98 – via HathiTrust.
