= Eliza Meek =

Royal mistress of King Lunalilo

Eliza Meek (March 3, 1832 – February 8, 1888) was the daughter of Captain John Meek, an early American settler of the Kingdom of Hawaii. In her early youth, she was renown for her equestrian skills on her father's land. She later became the royal mistress of King Lunalilo and formed a contentious relationship with Queen Emma of Hawaii and was rumored to be the main obstacle between a possible marriage between the two. Along with a group of other members of the royal court, Eliza accompanied the king to Kailua-Kona during his last illness and remained by Lunalilo's side until his death from tuberculosis on his return to Honolulu on February 3, 1874. Little is known about her later life; Eliza was financially well-off until her death on February 8, 1888.

== Early life ==
Eliza Meek was born on March 3, 1832, to Captain John Meek (1792–1875) and Betsy W. Meek (1807–1848). John was a New Englander from Marblehead, Massachusetts, who first arrived in Hawaii about 1809 and served for many years as harbor master and pilot of Honolulu. Betsy was the Hawaiian wife of Captain Meek and died on May 5, 1848. Eliza grew up with many siblings including her youngest sister Elizabeth "Betsy" Meek (1841–1895), who married American settler Horace Gate Crabbe in 1857 and had five children. In her youth, Eliza was noted for her equestrian skills on her father's lands at Lihue and Wahiawa on the island of Oʻahu where their family raised thorough-bred horses which were well known across the islands. According to archivist and historian Albert Pierce Taylor, Eliza was often "seen riding the horse through the streets of Honolulu garbed in a wonderful pa-u, with a dozen or more followers riding behind her wearing the same color of garment". Eliza was considered a great beauty in her youth and possessed green-color eyes indicative of her hapa-haole (half-European, half-Hawaiian) heritage.

== Relationship with Lunalilo ==
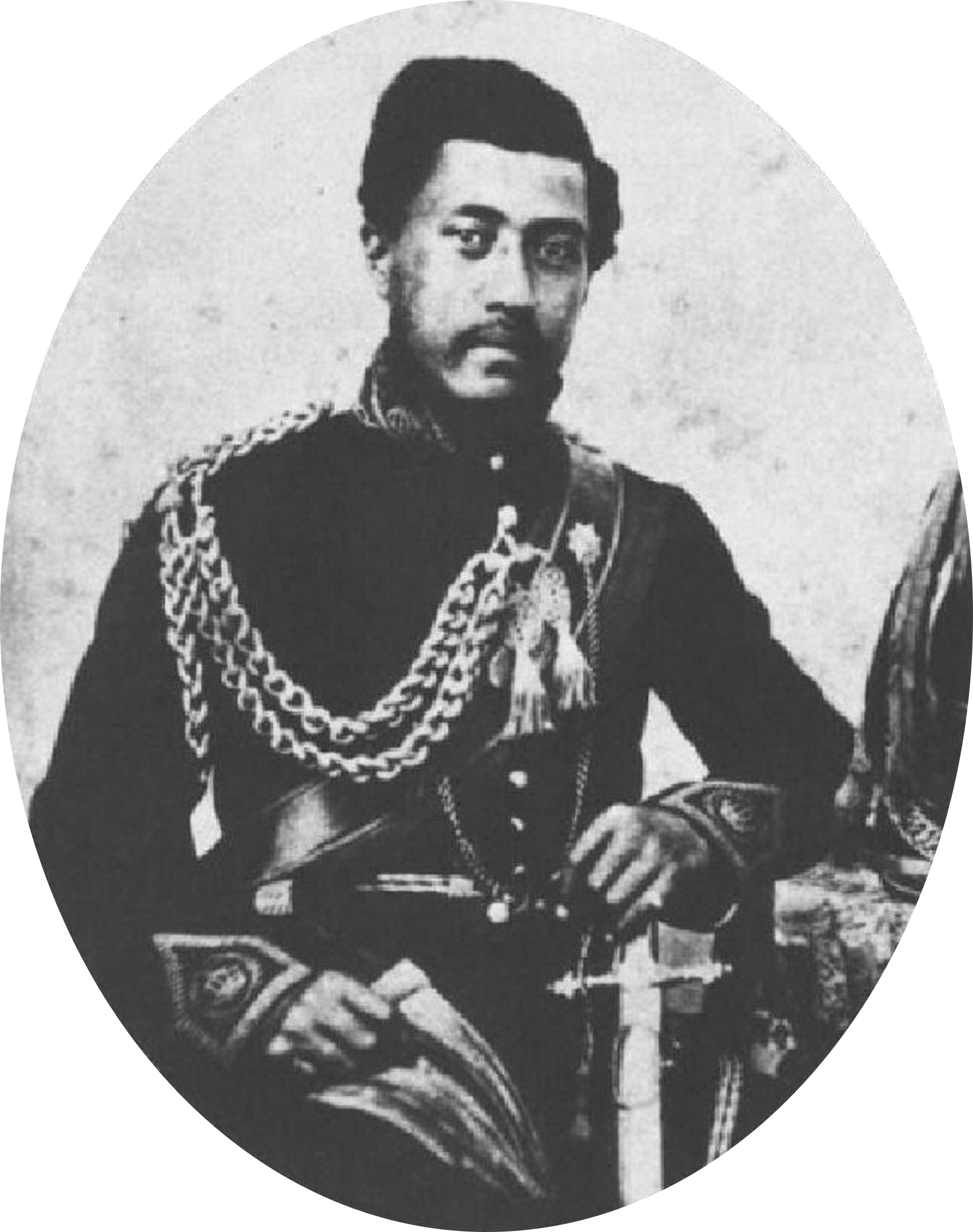
Although King Lunalilo remained a bachelor for his entire life, he took Eliza Meek as his mistress.

Eliza became the mistress of King Lunalilo, who had remained a bachelor for his entire life. She developed a contentious relationship with Queen Emma of Hawaii, the widow of Kamehameha IV and a close friend of Lunalilo. According to one of Emma's letters, an elderly palace attendant Waiaha and several other older women had given Lunalilo a "piece of bananannah [sic] stalk pressed to drink, medicated with love potions, to produce intense affections for Eliza Meek". Along with a group of Lunalilo's personal attendants and relatives (including his chamberlain and Eliza's brother-in-law Horace Crabbe), Eliza was present during the king's final months of illness. During this period, Eliza was notoriously hostile to Emma, who occasionally visited the ailing King to help nurse him. According to Dr. Georges Phillipe Trousseau, the King's personal physician, Lunalilo would have married Emma had it not been for Eliza's interference. Eliza would refuse to leave Emma alone with Lunalilo even at the king's command. One night, in a fit of rage, Lunalilo threw a chair and a spittoon at Eliza's head after an argument with between the two. Emma recounted the instance in a letter to her cousin Peter Kaʻeo:

The last bit of news yesterday morning is the King's anger against Eliza Wednesday (yesterday) night for being impudent to him. He threw a chair at her head and a spitoon also, which made a great cut on the side of her head. The nearest Doctor was sent for [and] both McGrew and McKibbin arrived. It seems the King told her to come to bed — she replied what right has a dog or a bitch there, which instantly gave vent to his ill temper that he had been brooding some days, and used a word of four letters belonging only to Waterclosets. She retorted, "Oh, I suppose that is what you eat to exist on." This brought the King's rage to an instant climax and [he] threw the articles at her head. I had intended to call yesterday to see how he continues to improve, but this domestic fracas of the Royal household puts it out of the question, till a few days more when the King will be settled and not so upset.

Despite the scuffle, Eliza was part of the royal party who accompanied Lunalilo when he sailed to Kailua-Kona, in November 1873, the following month, in the hope that the dry weather would improve his tuberculosis. However, the trip had no lasting effect on Lunalilo's health. After returning to Honolulu, Lunalilo succumbed to the disease and died on February 3, 1874.

== Later life ==
Little is known of Eliza's life after Lunalilo's death. She died at Peleula – her brother-in-law and sister's residence – on February 8, 1888, at the age of fifty-five. In her later life, Eliza was financially well-off and owned a half interest in property on King Street, near Maunakea. According to The Daily Bulletin newspaper, she had been ill for a month before she died and her death was "caused by a general breaking".

== Bibliography ==
- Blount, James Henderson (1895). The Executive Documents of the House of Representatives for the Second Session of the Fifty-Third Congress, 1893–'94 in Thirty-One Volumes. Washington, DC: U.S. Government Printing Office. pp. 520–521. OCLC 191710879.
- Dye, Bob (1997). Merchant Prince of the Sandalwood Mountains: Afong and the Chinese in Hawaiʻi. Honolulu: University of Hawaii Press. ISBN 978-0-8248-1772-5. OCLC 247424976.
- Galuteria, Peter; Burningham, Robin Yoko (1993). Lunalilo (Revised ed.). Honolulu: Kamehameha Schools/Bernice Pauahi Bishop Estate. ISBN 978-0-87336-019-7. OCLC 32857010.
- Haley, James L. (2014). Captive Paradise: A History of Hawaii. New York: St. Martin's Press. ISBN 978-1-4668-5550-2. OCLC 893209688.
- Kaeo, Peter; Queen Emma (1976). Korn, Alfons L. (ed.). News from Molokai, Letters Between Peter Kaeo & Queen Emma, 1873–1876. Honolulu: The University Press of Hawaii. hdl:10125/39980. ISBN 978-0-8248-0399-5. OCLC 2225064.
- Kanahele, George S. (1999). Emma: Hawaii's Remarkable Queen. Honolulu: University of Hawaii Press. ISBN 978-0-8248-2240-8. OCLC 40890919.
- Prall, Richard Dwight (1997). The Crabb Family. Albuquerque, NM: R. D. Prall. ISBN 978-0-9625633-1-7. OCLC 37461126.
- Taylor, Albert Pierce (1922). Under Hawaiian Skies: A Narrative of the Romance, Adventure and History of the Hawaiian Islands. Honolulu: Advertiser Publishing Company, Ltd. OCLC 479709.
- Wakeman, Edgar (1878). The Log of an Ancient Mariner: Being the Life and Adventures of Captain Edgar Wakeman. San Francisco: A. L. Bancroft & Company, Printers. OCLC 15527028.
