= Akaiko Akana =

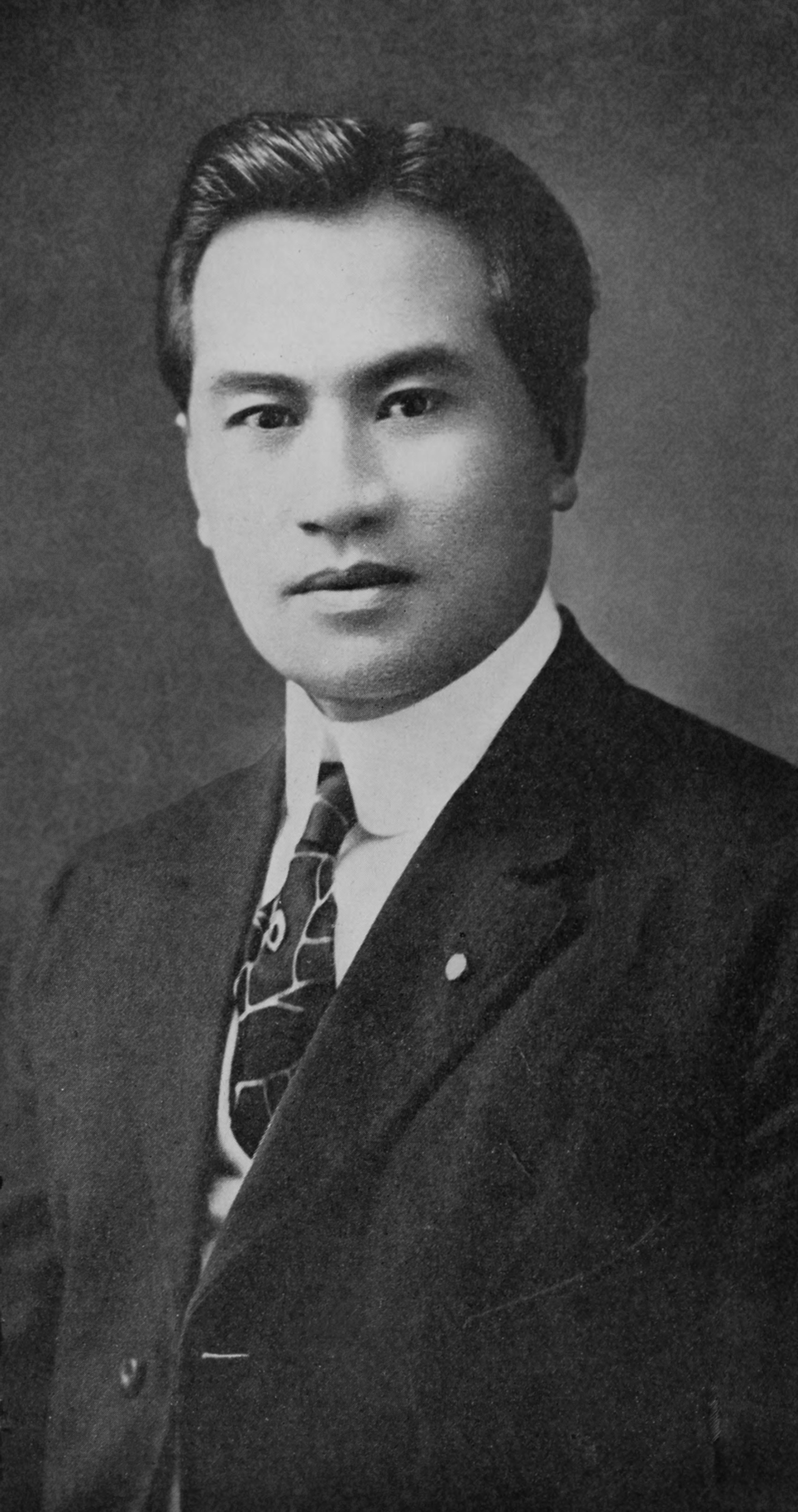
- Born: December 24, 1884; Kaihuwai, Waialua, Oahu
- Died: February 16, 1933 (aged 48); Honolulu, Territory of Hawaii
- Resting place: Liliuokalani Church Cemetery; Haleiwa, Hawaii
- Education: Hartford Seminary
- Known for: First Hawaiian Kahu (pastor) of Kawaiaha'o Church

Akaiko Akana (1884–1933), was the first Kahu (pastor) of Hawaiian ancestry at Kawaiahaʻo Church. He served in that capacity from 1918 until his death in 1933.

== Background ==
He was born December 24, 1884, to Chun Akana and Harriet Kahema in the Kaihuwai district of Waialua on the Hawaiian island of Oahu, in the Territory of Hawaii. Akana was of hapa (mixed) ancestry, with a Chinese father and Hawaiian mother.

He graduated from Kamehameha School for boys in 1903, and was assigned as a teaching assistant at his alma mater.

== The ministry ==
At the October 1906 annual meeting of the American Board of Commissioners for Foreign Missions, Akana delivered a speech in which he stated that his decision to enter the Christian ministry was a direct result of the groundwork laid by the Christian missionaries who set up churches in Hawaii decades before his birth. In encouraging the board to continue its work in Hawaii, the twenty-two-year-old Akana cited the Sabbath being broken in Hawaii by baseball and golf.

He earned a bachelor's degree in pedagogy at Hartford Seminary in Connecticut, where he was president of his graduating class. During the period 1910-11, he was affiliated with the Home Missions Board of Massachusetts. After his return to Hawaii, he served with the Hawaiian Evangelical Association, and was the founder of the Young People's League of Honolulu. Ordained into the ministry in 1912, he was selected as chaplain of the territorial House of Representatives in 1913.

When Rev. Henry Hodges Parker retired on January 27, 1918, after 54 years as Kahu of Kawaiahaʻo Church, Akana was called to serve as interim minister before being formally installed as Kahu on November 3, 1918. Music for the occasion was provided by ukulele virtuoso Ernest Kaʻai, the Correlli Brothers String Trio, and students of Kamehameha Schools.

As noted by author Ethel Moseley Damon in her book on the church's history, Akana was the first Kahu of Hawaiian ancestry. The formation of a young peoples' choir had its beginning under Akana's leadership. While remaining well-liked among the congregation, he restored a quiet respect for God's house that he believed had been missing within its walls.

== Death and legacy ==
Akana published a 1911 research report "An Inductive Study on the Effects of Tobacco on Human Life". In 1920, Akana appeared before the United States House of Representatives hearings on "Public Protection of Maternity and Infancy", where he delivered a lengthy report on the subject matter as it related to the Territory of Hawaii.

Under his tutelage and encouragement, Alice Kahokuoluna became the first woman ordained by the Hawaiian Evangelical Association, and in her time was the only ordained woman Christian minister in Hawaii.

He died February 16, 1933, and was buried at Liliuokalani Church Cemetery in Haleiwa, Hawaii. Akana died intestacy with an estate valued at $1,000. He never married, and was survived by his brother Rev. Francis Akana of Kona, and his father Chun Akana of Honolulu.

== Published works ==
- Akana, Akaiko (1918). The Sinews for Racial Development: Dedicated to the Progress of the Hawaiian Young People of the Territory of Hawaii – via HathiTrust.
- Akana, Akaiko (1928). The Experience of the Hawaiian Homes Commission in Carrying Out its Work. OCLC 663703295.
- Akana, Akaiko; DeFries, Eleanora M (1993). Light Upon the Mist: Reflections of Wisdom for the Future Generations of Native Hawaiians. Mahina Productions. ISBN 0963517309. OCLC 29413247.
