= Lunalilo =

King of Hawaii from 1873 to 1874

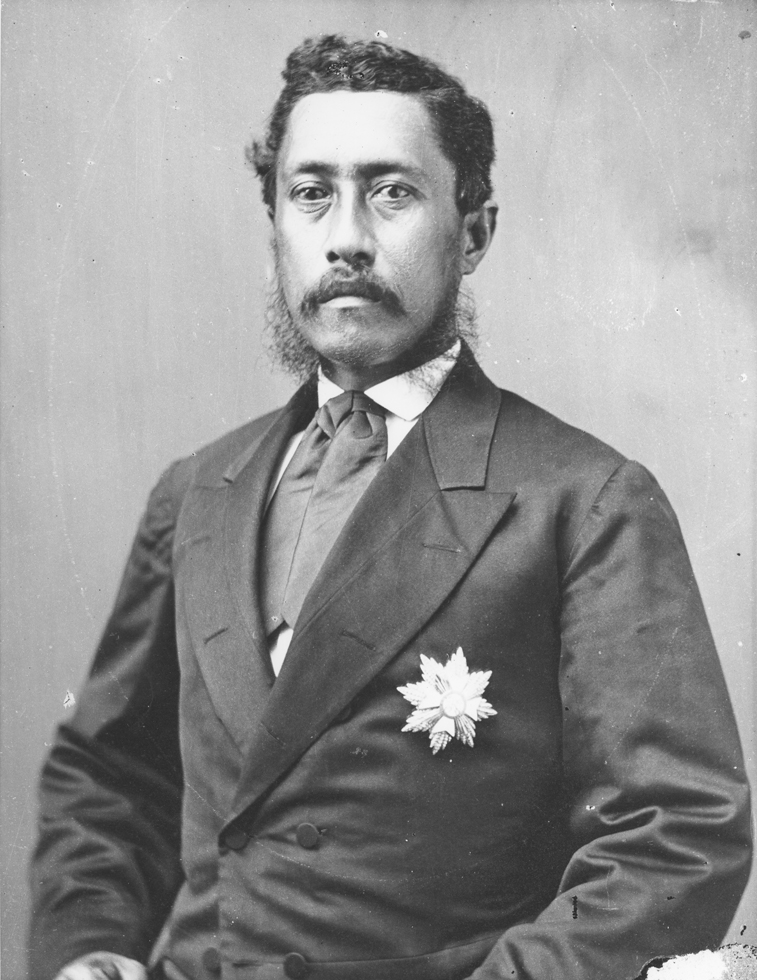
- Photograph by Menzies Dickson

King of the Hawaiian Islands
- Reign: January 8, 1873 – February 3, 1874
- Predecessor: Kamehameha V
- Successor: Kalākaua
- Born: January 31, 1835; Pohukaina, Honolulu, Oahu
- Died: February 3, 1874 (aged 39); Haimoeipo, Honolulu, Oahu
- Burial: February 28, 1874; Royal Mausoleum at Mauna ʻAla (temporary); November 23, 1875; Lunalilo Mausoleum, Kawaiahaʻo Church
Names
- William Charles Lunalilo
- House: Kalaimamahu
- Father: Charles Kanaina
- Mother: Kekāuluohi

Lunalilo (William Charles Lunalilo; January 31, 1835 – February 3, 1874) was the sixth monarch of the Kingdom of Hawaii from his election on January 8, 1873, until his death a year later.

Born to Kekāuluohi and High Chief Charles Kanaʻina, he was of royal descent and a grandnephew of King Kamehameha I. He was educated at the Royal School by American missionaries and was proclaimed eligible for the throne by King Kamehameha III. After the death of King Kamehameha V, he was elected to the throne in 1873 by a unanimous decision of the legislature of the kingdom. Due to his popularity and status as Hawaii's first elected monarch, he became known as "The People's King". He died a year later from tuberculosis.

== Early life ==
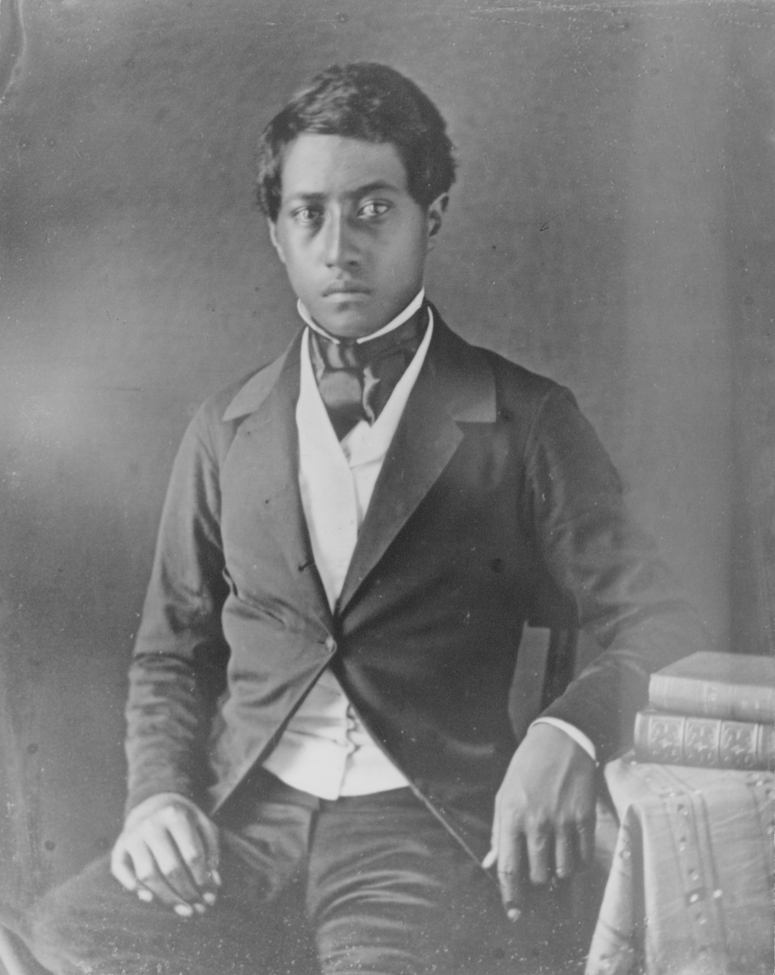
Lunalilo as a teenager, c. 1850-52

William Charles Lunalilo was born on January 31, 1835, in a two-story house made of coral brick, an area known as Pohukaina, now part the grounds of the ʻIolani Palace in Honolulu. His mother was High Chiefess Miriam Auhea Kekāuluohi (later styled as Kaʻahumanu III) and his father was High Chief Charles Kanaʻina. He was grandnephew of Kamehameha I by blood and the monarch's stepson by marriage to his mother. His grandmother was Kalākua Kaheiheimālie, sister of Kamehameha's favorite wife, Queen Kaʻahumanu.

This made him both, a second cousin as well as first cousin to King Kamehameha V, King Kamehameha IV, and Princess Victoria Kamāmalu through their mothers: Kekāuluohi and Kīnaʻu (later styled as Kaʻahumanu II) who were half-sisters. Lunalilo translates as Luna (high) lilo (lost) or "so high up as to be lost to sight" in the Hawaiian language. He was also named after King William IV of the United Kingdom, a great friend of the Hawaiian royal family.

In the 2000 publication; "Kamehameha's Children Today", authors Charles Ahlo, Rubellite Kawena Kinney Johnson and Jerry Walker state that Lunalilo's father, Charles Kanaʻina was the great-great grandson of Kamehameha I. Kanaʻina's maternal grandfather, Palila Nohomualani was Kamehameha I's grandson through the monarch's first born child named Kahiliʻōpua, daughter of Kalola-a-Kumukoa, also known as Kalolawahilani. This genealogy is based on previously unpublished family trees compiled by the DeFries family.

He was declared eligible to succeed by the royal decree of King Kamehameha III and sent to the Chief's Children's School, later called the Royal School, when it was founded by missionaries Amos Starr Cooke and Juliette Montague Cooke. Learning to speak both Hawaiian and English, he gained a mastery of English literature and love of Shakespearian soliloquies. According to one of his cousins, Elizabeth Kekaaniau, Lunalilo was groomed to one day assume the Governorship of Oahu after Kekūanaōʻa's death.

Before the Great Mahele Lunalilo's holdings of 239 ʻāina were second only to Kamehameha III. As a result of the Mahele, he relinquished 73 percent of his land. As of 1848, at the age of thirteen, he was still one of the largest landowners after the King, inheriting the land and personal property given to his mother father and grandmother by Kamehameha I. In 1850 Lunalilo gave up another large amount of land to the government reducing his holdings to 43 lots.

Affectionately known as "Prince Bill," he was one of the royals, besides Kalākaua and Liliʻuokalani, to write music. He composed Hawaii's first national anthem, "E Ola Ke Aliʻi Ke Akua," which was Hawaii's version of "God Save The King". He wrote the song in fifteen minutes in a contest hosted by newspaper publisher Henry Whitney in 1862 for the birthday of Kamehameha IV. He won the contest and was awarded ten dollars.

Lunalilo served on the Privy Council of State, the advisory council for the monarch, from 1863 to 1865, during the reign of his cousin King Kamehameha V. He also served on the House of Nobles, the upper house of the legislature, traditionally reserved for the high chiefs, from 1863 to 1872.

== Prospective royal brides ==
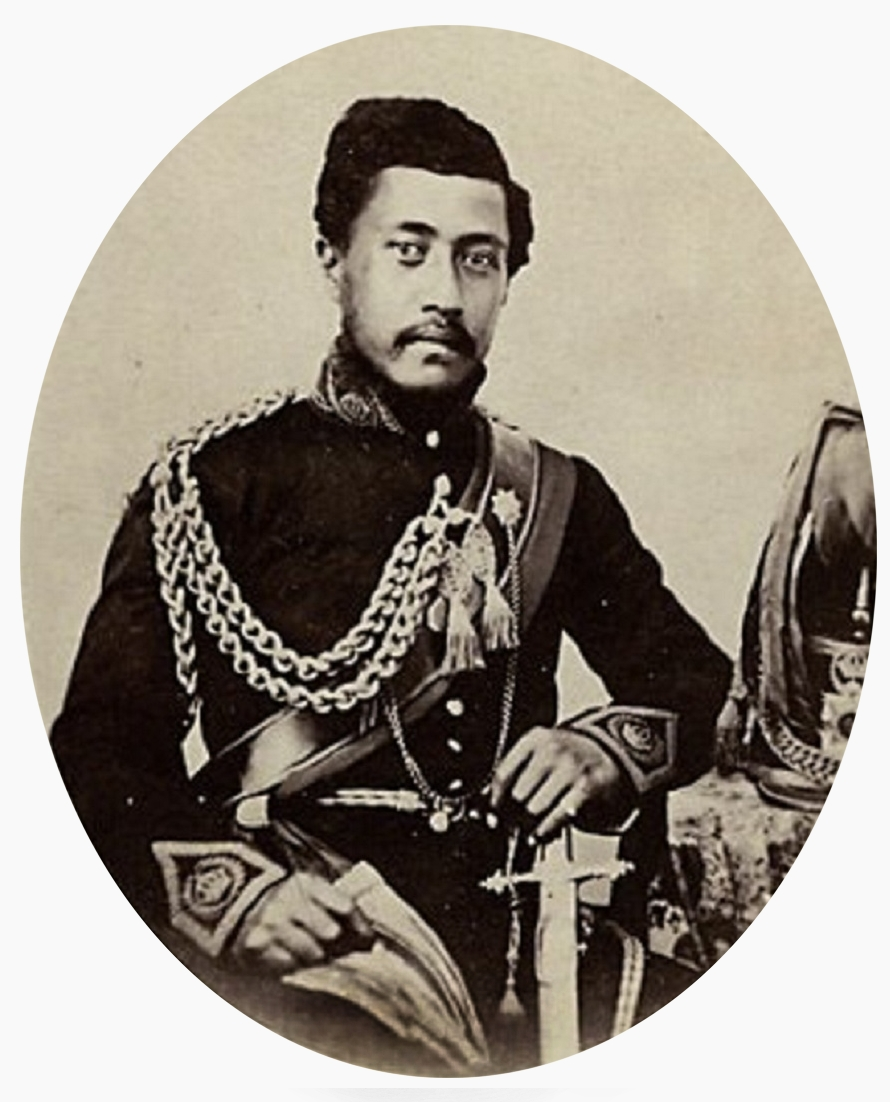
A photograph of a young Lunalilo by Henry L. Chase.

He was betrothed to his cousin Princess Victoria Kamāmalu, a popular choice among the Hawaiian people except for Victoria's brothers. They both refused to have her marry him. Their children would outrank the House of Kamehameha in family rank (mana). There were two failed attempts of marriage between the two. Lunalilo composed the Hawaiian song ʻAlekoki for his unrequited love.

After Victoria, he briefly courted the hand of Liliʻuokalani, but she broke off the engagement on the advice of Kamehameha IV. Liliʻuokalani eventually married American John Owen Dominis. Victoria Kamāmalu died unmarried and childless at the age of 27 in 1866. Another alleged prospective bride was a maternal cousin Miriam Auhea Kekāuluohi Crowningburg, who married a German-American settler instead.

During his reign as king, it was proposed that he marry Queen Emma, the widow of Kamehameha IV, but this proposal came to nothing due to Queen Emma's devotion to her late husband. They remained friends and it was said he considered naming her as his heir before he died. According to Emma's cousin Peter Kaʻeo, there was gossip that the King would marry a Tahitian chiefess from Bora Bora. Although never marrying, the king took Eliza Meek (1832–1888), the hapa-haole daughter of Captain John Meek, the harbor pilot of Honolulu, and sister-in-law of his chamberlain Horace Crabbe, as his mistress.

== Election ==
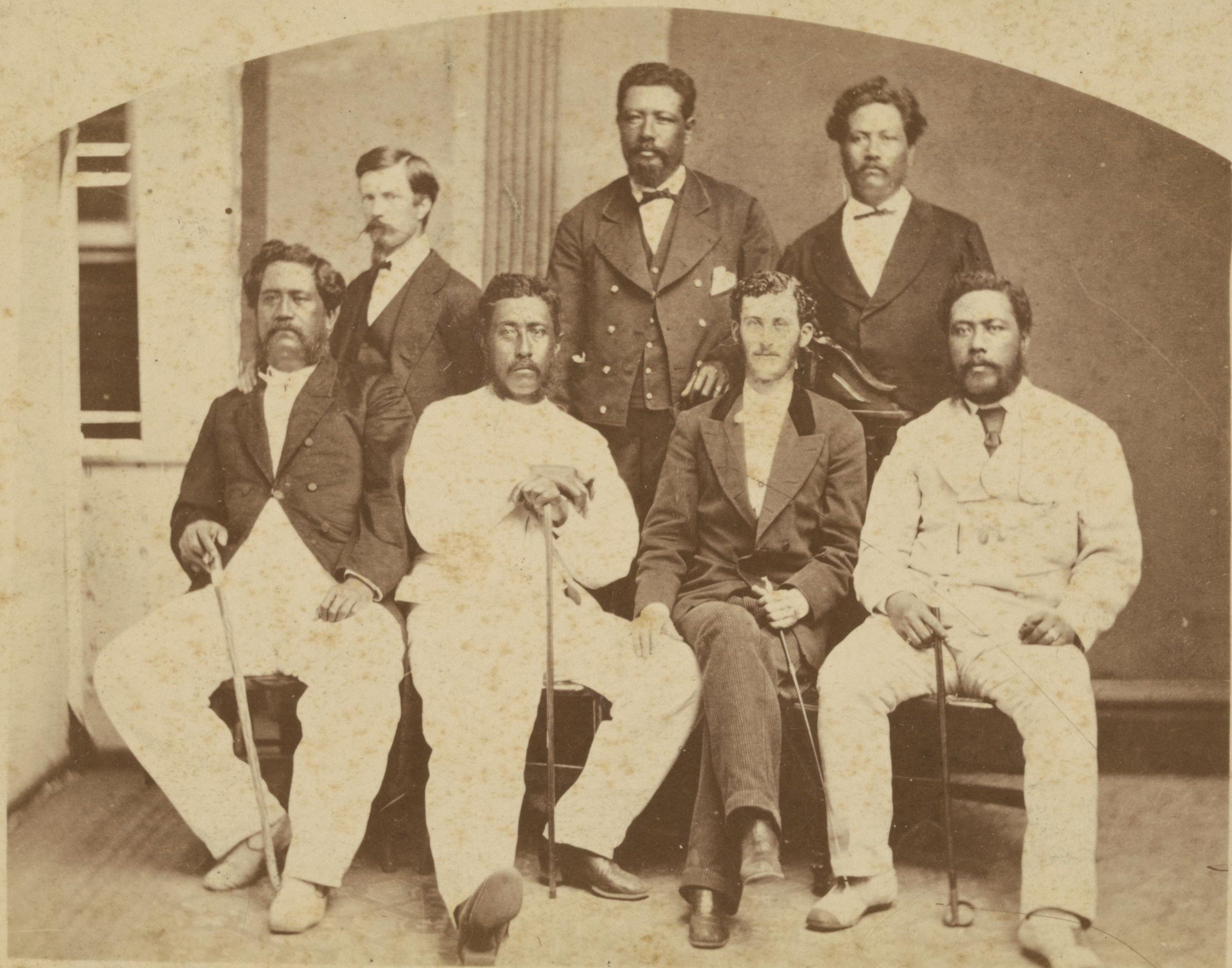
Lunalilo, seated, second from left, was considered the more popular candidate.

King Kamehameha V, the last of the Kamehameha kings, died on December 11, 1872, without naming a successor. Under the Kingdom's 1864 constitution, if the king did not appoint a successor, a new king would be elected by the legislature from the eligible Hawaiian royalty still alive. The other candidate was David Kalākaua.

Lunalilo was the more popular of the two. His grandfather was Kalaimamahu, a half brother of Kamehameha I and was thus a cousin of King Kamehameha V. His grandmother was Queen Kalakua Kaheiheimalie, sister of Queen Kaʻahumanu. Because of this, many people believed the throne rightly belonged to Lunalilo since the only person more closely related to Kamehameha V, Bernice Pauahi Bishop, made clear she did not want the throne.

Another contender was Princess Ruth Keʻelikōlani who was a half sister to King Kamehameha V. She was a favorite among the Hawaiian chiefs because of her adhering to the old Hawaiian ways. She was governess of Hawaii and refused to speak English even though she was fluent in it. Her genealogy, however, was too controversial and few people considered her suitable to take the throne.

This left Kalākaua and Lunalilo. Of the two, Lunalilo was greatly favored. So great was Lunalilo's popularity that some people believed that Lunalilo could have simply walked into the capital and declared himself king. Lunalilo, however, insisted that the constitution be followed. He issued the following message six days after the death of Kamehameha V:

"Whereas, it is desirable that the wishes of the Hawaiian people be consulted as to a successor to the Throne, therefore, notwithstanding that according to the law of inheritance, I am the rightful heir to the Throne, in order to preserve peace, harmony and good order, I desire to submit the decision of my claim to the voice of the people."

Lunalilo, unlike his more conservative opponent, wanted to amend the constitution to make the government more democratic by removing property qualifications for voting. It was decided that there would be a popular election to give the people a chance to have their voices heard. Because the constitution gave the legislature the power to decide who would be the next king, the popular election would be unofficial. Lunalilo urged the people of the Kingdom to have their voices heard.

The popular vote was held on January 1, 1873, and Lunalilo won by an overwhelming majority. The week after, the legislature unanimously voted Lunalilo king. It has been speculated that the reason for the unanimous vote was because each legislator was required to sign his name on the back of his ballot, and the legislators were afraid to go against the wishes of the people. Queen Emma later wrote in a letter that hundreds of Hawaiians were ready to tear to pieces anyone who opposed Lunalilo.

At Lunalilo's investiture ceremony, held on January 9, 1873, at Kawaiahaʻo Church, the courtyard was filled to capacity and a large crowd watched from outside. Because Lunalilo's popularity was so great, and because he became king through a democratic process, he became known as "The People's King."

== Reign as King ==
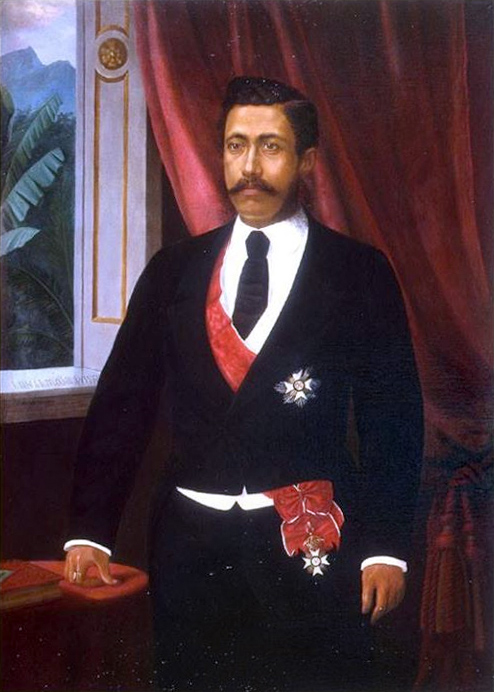
Lunalilo, painting by Danish artist Eiler Jurgensen, ʻIolani Palace

When Lunalilo assumed the duties of the king, a huge change in the government's policy began to form. His predecessor, Kamehameha V, had spent his reign increasing the powers of his office and trying to restore the absolute monarchy of his grandfather, Kamehameha I. Lunalilo spent his reign trying to make the Hawaiian government more democratic. He started by writing to the legislature, recommending that the constitution be amended. He wanted to undo some changes that his predecessor had made when he enacted the 1864 Constitution.

For example, the Kingdom legislature prior to 1864 met in two houses: The House of Nobles and the House of Representatives. The members of the House of Nobles were appointed by the King and the Representatives were elected by popular vote. Lunalilo served in the House of Nobles from 1863 through 1872. Under King Kamehameha V, the two houses of legislature were combined into one. Lunalilo wished to restore the bicameral legislature. He also wanted to add a provision to the constitution that required the king to include a written explanation to accompany any veto by the king. He wanted cabinet ministers to be heard in the House of Representatives.

The King also wanted to improve Hawaii's economic situation. The Kingdom was in an economic depression, with the whaling industry rapidly declining. Commerce groups asked the king to look at sugar to improve the economy and recommended that a treaty be drawn with the United States to allow Hawaiian sugar to enter the nation tax-free. To make such a treaty, many thought that the Kingdom would have to offer the Pearl Harbor area to the United States in exchange. There was much controversy over this, with both the public and in the legislature. When Lunalilo saw this opposition, he dropped the proposal.

During Lunalilo's reign, a mutiny took place in the small Hawaiian army. Some members of the army revolted against the drillmaster and the adjutant general. The king interviewed the troops involved in the mutiny and he persuaded them to lay down their arms. Following this, the king disbanded the army apart from the military band. From that point on, the Kingdom had no armed forces until King Kalākaua restored them.

== Illness and death ==
King Lunalilo had some bad health habits; for example, he was an alcoholic. Around August 1873, Lunalilo contracted a severe cold which developed into pulmonary tuberculosis. In hopes of regaining his health, he moved to Kailua-Kona. A few months later, on February 3, 1874, he died from tuberculosis at the age of 39, at Haimoeipo, his private residence in Honolulu. Lunalilo had reigned for one year and twenty-five days.

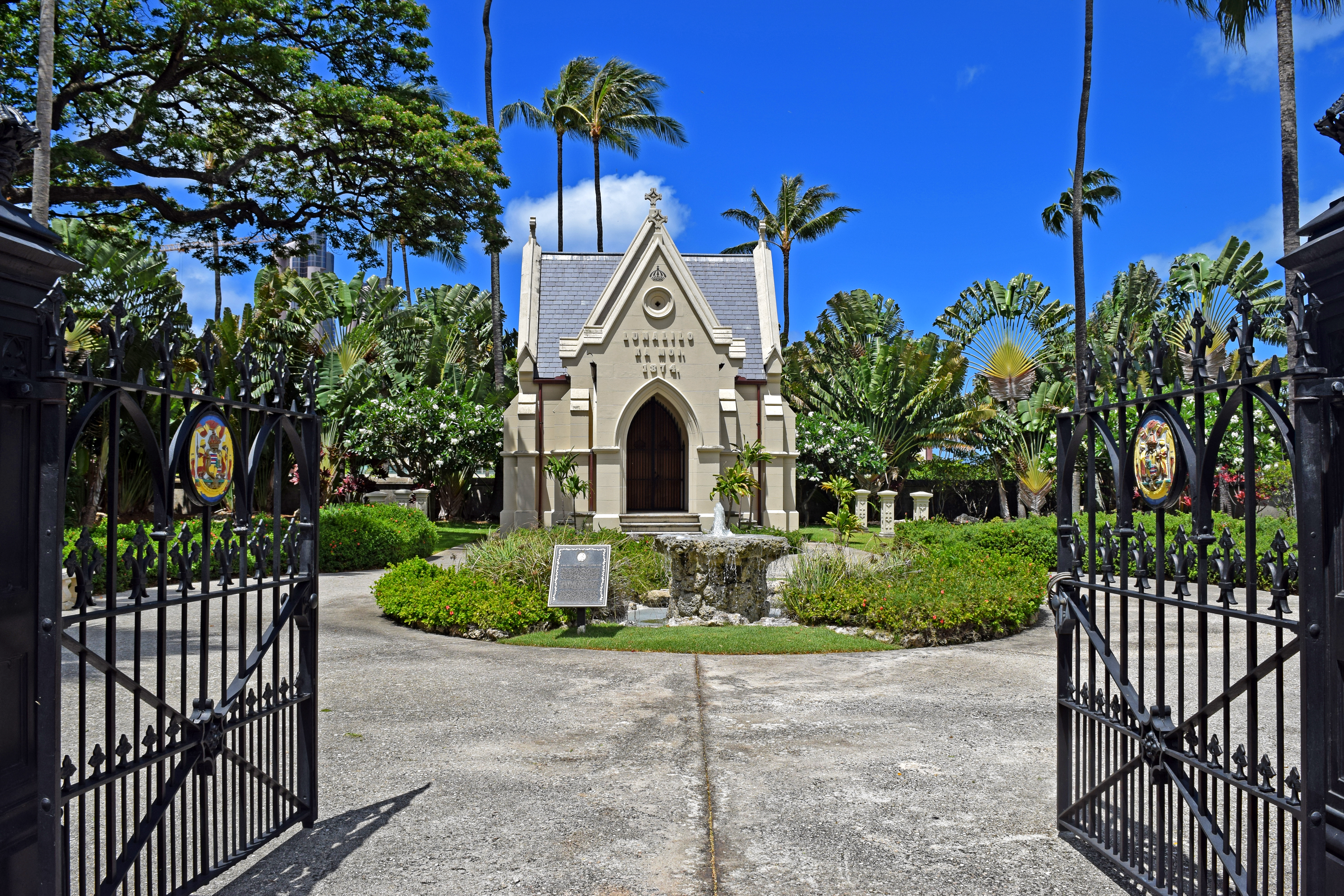
King Lunalilo's Mausoleum.

On his deathbed, he requested a burial at Kawaiahaʻo Church on the church's ground. He wanted, he said, to be "entombed among (my) people, rather than the kings and chiefs" at the Royal Mausoleum in Nuʻuanu Valley. This was due to a feud between Lunalilo and the Kamehameha family over his mother Kekāuluohi's exclusion from the list of royalty to be buried there.

Thus, on November 23, 1875, his remains were taken from the Mausoleum, where it had rested temporarily awaiting the completion of the Lunalilo Mausoleum, to the completed tomb on the grounds of Kawaiahaʻo Church. His father requested a second funeral and a 21-gun salute from Kalākaua like during his first funeral. Kalākaua granted the second funeral but refused to allow the 21-gun salute. During this procession, eyewitness reports stated that a sudden storm arose, and that twenty-one rapid thunderclaps echoed across Honolulu which came to be known as the "21-gun salute."

Like his predecessor, Lunalilo did not designate an heir to the throne. It was said he had intended for Queen Emma to succeed him, but died before a formal proclamation could be made. The most prevalent explanation of this delay is regarding his democratic principles: he wished to have the people choose their next ruler. However, the constitution of 1864 had charged the legislature, not the people, with the task of electing the next king. In the end, Kalākaua of the House of Kalākaua was voted to succeed Lunalilo as king. The election provoked the Honolulu Courthouse riots in which supporters of Queen Emma targeted legislators who supported Kalākaua; thirteen legislators were injured, with J. W. Lonoaea the only one to die from his injuries.

== Legacy ==
In his will, Lunalilo set aside lands for the establishment of the Lunalilo Home, the first charitable trust established by a Hawaiian aliʻi trust, to house the poor, destitute, and infirm people of Hawaiian descent, with preference given to older people.

=== In popular culture ===
The 2025 play "Outlandish" by the Kumu Kahua Theatre dramatizes his encounter with Victorian writer Isabella Bird as she travels in Hilo, Kaipo Dudoit portrays him.

== Bibliography ==
- Charlot, John (1982). "William Charles Lunalilo's 'Alekoki' as an Example of Cultural Synthesis in 19th century Hawaiian Literature". The Journal of the Polynesian Society. 91 (3). Wellington: The Polynesian Society: 435–444. OCLC 6015270527. Archived from the original on February 13, 2018.
- Dabagh, Jean; Lyons, Curtis Jere; Hitchcock, Harvey Rexford (1974). Dabagh, Jean (ed.). "A King is Elected: One Hundred Years Ago" (PDF). The Hawaiian Journal of History. 8. Honolulu: Hawaiian Historical Society: 76–89. hdl:10524/112. OCLC 60626541.
- Dole, Sanford B. (1915). "Thirty Days of Hawaiian History". Twenty-Third Annual Report of the Hawaiian Historical Society for the Year 1914. Honolulu: Hawaiian Historical Society: 28–49. hdl:10524/31.
- Galuteria, Peter (1993) [1991]. Lunalilo (Revised ed.). Honolulu: Kamehameha Schools/Bernice Pauahi Bishop Estate. ISBN 978-0-87336-019-7. OCLC 32857010.
- Judd, A. Francis; Hawaiian Historical Society (1936). "Lunalilo, the Sixth King of Hawaii". Forty-Fourth Annual Report of the Hawaiian Historical Society for the Year 1935. Honolulu: Hawaiian Historical Society: 27–43. hdl:10524/50.
- Judd, Walter F. (1975). Palaces and Forts of the Hawaiian Kingdom: From Thatch to American Florentine. Palo Alto, CA: Pacific Books. ISBN 978-0-87015-216-0.
- Kaeo, Peter; Queen Emma (1976). Korn, Alfons L. (ed.). News from Molokai, Letters Between Peter Kaeo & Queen Emma, 1873–1876. Honolulu: University Press of Hawaii. ISBN 978-0-8248-0399-5.
- Kameʻeleihiwa, Lilikalā (1992). Native Land and Foreign Desires. Honolulu: Bishop Museum Press. ISBN 0-930897-59-5.
- Kanahele, George S. (1999). Emma: Hawaii's Remarkable Queen. Honolulu: University of Hawaii Press. ISBN 978-0-8248-2240-8.
- Kuykendall, Ralph Simpson (1953). The Hawaiian Kingdom 1854–1874, Twenty Critical Years. Vol. 2. Honolulu: University of Hawaii Press. ISBN 978-0-87022-432-4. OCLC 47010821.
- Kuykendall, Ralph Simpson (1967). The Hawaiian Kingdom 1874–1893, The Kalakaua Dynasty. Vol. 3. Honolulu: University of Hawaii Press. ISBN 978-0-87022-433-1. OCLC 500374815.
- Liliuokalani (1898). Hawaii's Story by Hawaii's Queen, Liliuokalani. Boston: Lee and Shepard. ISBN 978-0-548-22265-2.
- Osorio, Jon Kamakawiwoʻole (2002). Dismembering Lāhui: A History of the Hawaiian Nation to 1887. Honolulu: University of Hawaii Press. ISBN 0-8248-2549-7.
- Potter, Norris Whitfield; Kasdon, Lawrence M. (1964). Hawaii: Our Island State. Columbus, OH: C. E. Merrill Books.
- Pratt, Elizabeth Kekaaniauokalani Kalaninuiohilaukapu (1920). History of Keoua Kalanikupuapa-i-nui: Father of Hawaii Kings, and His Descendants, with Notes on Kamehameha I, First King of All Hawaii. Honolulu: Honolulu Star-Bulletin. OCLC 154181545.
- Smith, Emmerson C. (1956). "The History of Musical Development in Hawaii". Sixty-Fourth Annual Report of the Hawaiian Historical Society for the Year 1955. Honolulu: Hawaiian Historical Society: 5–13. hdl:10524/59.
- Thrum, Thomas G (March 3, 1874). The Second interregnum: a complete resume of events from the death to the burial of His late Majesty Lunalilo (PDF). Honolulu: T. G. Thrum. pp. 1–19. Archived from the original (PDF) on July 4, 2015.
- Tsai, Tiffany Ing (2016). "The 1873 Election in Hawaiʻi between Prince William Charles Lunalilo and the Other Candidate". The Hawaiian Journal of History. 50 (50). Honolulu: Hawaiian Historical Society: 53–73. doi:10.1353/hjh.2016.0002. hdl:10524/59459. OCLC 60626541. S2CID 164663327 – via Project MUSE.
- Van Dyke, Jon M. (2008). Who Owns the Crown Lands of Hawaiʻi?. Honolulu: University of Hawaii Press. ISBN 978-0-8248-3211-7.
- Young, Kanalu G. Terry (1998). Rethinking the Native Hawaiian Past. New York: Garland Publishing, Inc. ISBN 978-0-8153-3120-9.

Hawaiian royalty
Preceded by Kamehameha V	King of Hawaii; 1873–1874	Succeeded by Kalākaua
