= Abraham Akaka =

American clergyman

- Born: Abraham Kahikina Akaka; February 21, 1917; Pauoa Valley, Oahu, Territory of Hawaii
- Died: September 10, 1997 (aged 80); Honolulu, Hawaii
- Education: List: President William McKinley High School; University of Hawaii 1934–1937 Undergraduate H.H.D. 1980; Illinois Wesleyan University A.B. 1939; Chicago Theological Seminary B.D. 1943 H.D.D. 1958
- Spouse: Mary Louise Jeffrey
- Children: 5
- Parent(s): Anuenue Akaka; Kahikina Akaka

Ecclesiastical career
- Church: Kawaiahaʻo
- Ordained: 1944
- Congregations: List: (1945–1954) Maui Waihe'e Church Ka'ahumanu Church Kahului Union Church Waikapu Church Keawalai Church; (1954–1957) Hilo Haili Church; (1957–1984) Honolulu Kawaiahaʻo Church; (1984-Death) The Rev. Akaka Ministries Foundation
- Offices held: List: Chairman, Hawaii Advisory Committee of the U.S. Civil Rights; President, Hawaii Conference of the United Church of Christ; Regent, University of Hawaii; Corporate member, United Church Board of World Ministries
- Title: Kahu (shepherd), Reverend

Abraham Kahikina Akaka (February 21, 1917 – September 10, 1997) was an American clergyman. For 27 years, Rev. Akaka was Kahu (shepherd) of Kawaiahaʻo Church in Honolulu, Hawaii. His mother was of Hawaiian ancestry, and his father was of Hawaiian and Chinese ancestry. He delivered his messages in both the Hawaiian and English languages.

== Background and education ==
Abraham Akaka was born in Pauoa, Hawaii, on the island of Oahu, the fourth of eight natural children and two adopted children, in the family of Kahikina Akaka (1884–1978) and Annie Kahoa Akaka (1888–1947). United States Senator Daniel Akaka (1924–2018) was one of his brothers. Akaka was of Hawaiian ancestry through his mother and Hawaiian-Chinese ancestry through his father. His paternal grandmother was Hawaiian-Chinese, and his paternal grandfather was born in China.

In a Congressional Record tribute to his brother, Senator Daniel Akaka described a devout Christian home life that included prayer, scripture reading, and hymns in the Hawaiian language. The latter, he said, helped nurture his brother's musical abilities. He attributed his older brother's interest in physical fitness to his childhood Tarzan role-playing.

During the administration of territorial governor Wallace Rider Farrington, he and his wife Catharine opened their home to the public twice a month. Akaka would later remember, "...Governor Farrington had us kids over at his house. I took cookies home in my pockets from there."

A graduate of President William McKinley High School in Honolulu, Akaka did undergraduate work at the University of Hawaii, and received his BA degree at Illinois Wesleyan University in 1939. He received his BDiv degree at Chicago Theological Seminary in 1943. In 1980, he received his HHD (Honorary Doctor of Humane Letters) from the University of Hawaii.

== Ministry ==
While a student at Illinois Wesleyan University, Akaka embarked on a speaking tour as part of the YMCA Interracial youth cabinet. He was chosen as Hawaii's 1939 delegate to the World Student Christian Conference in Amsterdam. While working towards his doctorate in Chicago, he was known through local churches as a combination speaker and singer. One of his career goals was a focus on social services. He was ordained in 1944. His first pastorate upon returning to Hawaii was with the Western Kauai Larger Parish council, followed by 9 years ministering to five different churches on Maui, and three years pastoring at Haili Church in Hilo, before becoming Kahu of Kawaiahaʻo Church in Honolulu on January 31, 1957.

He was a ukulele aficionado, and the instrument was an integral part of his sermons, "According to our faith, we remember that Christ has made this world like a ukulele." While a ship's passenger on a return voyage from the mainland United States, he delivered a guest sermon with his recurring theme of racial harmony. He likened various races of the earth to ukulele strings, each unique in its pitch, but creating beautiful results when played together as one.

Kawaiahaʻo's historic status, and its location across the street from ʻIolani Palace and the Hawaii State Capitol, gave Akaka high visibility. After the successful 1970 return of the Apollo 13 astronauts, President Richard Nixon and his wife attended services at Kawaiahao. Akaka strummed his ukulele throughout his sermon, with background accompaniment from the church choir, and Nixon invited him to lead a service at the White House.

Akaka was known for his blessing ceremonies, so much so that Charles Hillinger of the Los Angeles Times nicknamed him "Hawaii's official blesser." While serving as pastor at Haili Church in Hilo, he anointed an ancient Hawaiian stone commemorating the site of the home of Kamehameha I and Queen Kaahumanu, at the opening of the Kona Palms built on the site. In Honolulu, Akaka's blessing ceremonies were given to animals, helped launch a new bus fleet, construction ground breaking ceremonies and airliners. He was so ubiquitous that local lore during his lifetime was that each structure in Honolulu had received his invocation.

== Statehood for Hawaii ==
Akaka was a proponent of statehood for Hawaii, and one of several Hawaii residents who testified before the United States Congress on January 17, 1948. At that time, he was pastor of Kahului Union Church on Maui. In speaking of his background, and the history of Hawaii, he conveyed the expression of "aloha" as a spiritual characteristic, and believed Hawaii had much to offer. He pressed the need to fully incorporate the territory into the union. "I think we want to belong, truly, entirely, psychologically. We all say we are Americans, but not quite, because we are a Territory. We want to truly belong."

When the statehood resolution was approved by the United States House of Representatives on March 12, 1959, a joint resolution was introduced in the Hawaii territorial legislature to make Hawaii's official nickname the "'Aloha State". Kawaiahao Church filled with people who wanted to pray, sing, and give thanks. The next day, Akaka's sermon before the congregation repeated the legislative nickname, "I would like today to speak the message of self-affirmation: that we take courage to be what we truly are, the Aloha State."

== Civil rights ==
The U.S. Civil Rights Commission was created by the Civil Rights Act of 1957, and each state has an unpaid appointed advisory board on the commission, with term limits on their service. Hawaii had been represented on the advisory board prior to its admission to statehood on August 21, 1959. When new board members were appointed in 1962, Akaka was appointed chairman, at which point he became active on a national level, joining the Rev. Martin Luther King Jr. on the 1963 march on Washington, D.C. In 1965, Akaka provided flower leis worn by King and his advisors on the third Selma Civil Rights March.

== Bishop estate ==
Akaka used his public position as a forum to defend the Bishop Estate's adherence to the intent of the will of Bernice Pauahi Bishop, when it faced a legal challenge on its "Hawaiians only" admission policy at Kamehameha Schools, and its hiring of Protestant-only teachers. He was equally vocal in his opposition to the appointment of Matsuo Takabuki as trustee, rather than someone of Hawaiian ancestry.

== Personal life and retirement ==
On July 22, 1944, Akaka married Mary Louise Jeffrey of Denver at Kawaiahaʻo Church. The couple had five children. Mary Akaka is credited as one of the persons who pushed for Kawaiahaʻo's 1962 listing as a National Historic Landmark.

Akaka suffered his first heart attack in 1964, and returned to the pulpit three months later for a Liliʻuokalani birthday service. He retired from Kawaiahaʻo Church in 1984, and began to channel his energies to The Reverend Akaka Ministries Foundation, established to provide assistance to individuals and organizations on a local and global basis. His last activity before his death was to conduct a service at Hawaiian Memorial Park Cemetery in Kaneohe. Collapsing shortly thereafter, he was in intensive care before dying on September 10, 1997, of a dissecting aortic aneurysm. His wife, Mary Louise Akaka, died eleven years later, in 2008.
