= Sammy Amalu =

Hawaiian columnist and con man (1917–1986)

- Born: Sammy Apollo Kapiʻikauinamokuonalani Amalu; 1917 (age 108–109)
- Died: 1986 (aged 68–69)
- Education: Punahou School
- Occupations: Columnist; socialite; confidence trickster
- Employer: The Honolulu Advertiser
- Known for: Sheraton Deal hoax (1962)
- Spouse: Jane Tomberlin

Sammy Apollo Kapiʻikauinamokuonalani Amalu (1917–1986) was a Kanaka Maoli descendant of a Hawaiian high chiefess, socialite, ex-convict, and columnist with The Honolulu Advertiser. Known by the media as "Hawaiʻi's favorite rascal," Amalu went by many aliases throughout his life. He posed as an Indian maharaja in San Francisco, a banker named Albert Wilcox, and a Swiss-based syndicate that went by The Presidium, among others.

== Sheraton Deal ==
Amalu is best known for his role in the "Sheraton Deal", a multi-million-dollar real estate hoax in which, posing as a Swiss-based syndicate, he fooled wealthy business tycoons who held large swaths of Hawaiian land into believing the deal was legitimate. In May 1962, Honolulu newspapers ran several stories about a mysterious syndicate from Switzerland that had offered the Sheraton Hotels $34 million for land they had purchased just three years earlier for $18 million. The hotel franchise stood to make a $16 million profit.

During this time, Amalu offered Molokaʻi Ranch executive George Murphy $5 million for the ranch's land. The next day, Amalu offered to purchase the entirety of Mākaha Valley for $9 million, as well as $1.2 million for the Waianae Development Company owned by a businessman named Chinn Ho.

While playing the role of a syndicate, Amalu obtained representation through the real estate firm of Milton Beamer and Ann Feltzer, which helped him fool wealthy investors. Within a single week, Amalu made seven offers on real estate, which totaled $62 million. Another factor in Amalu's successful prank was his claim that he had married an Italian princess named Maria. Amalu claimed that Maria and their son were both financiers in his business transactions. Amalu later admitted that the entire scheme was a joke.

== Marriages ==
Little is known about Amalu's claims of having been married, other than what he shared with reporters and columnists. Only one of Amalu's marriages is confirmed: to Jane Tomberlin. Tomberlin had been married to a millionaire from Texas before her 1956 wedding to Amalu, planned at the Brown Palace Hotel in Denver, Colorado. On the wedding day in November 1956, Amalu failed to show up at the altar, claiming that he had been abducted by his brother in Texas, who disagreed with the marriage. Tomberlin went ahead with the reception, serving champagne to her guests, some of whom had come from as far away as California. Amalu reconnected with Tomberlin not long after, and the two were married at the Antlers Hotel in Colorado Springs. Five days after their wedding, FBI agents arrested Amalu in Texas because his checks in both Denver and Texas had bounced. Tomberlin then filed for an annulment and cut off financial ties with Amalu, as the $45,000 check he had used to purchase their San Francisco home also bounced. Tomberlin later reversed her decision to annul the marriage.

In January 1946, The Honolulu Advertiser published a story in the society section about Amalu's marriage to an Italian princess, Maria Anastasia di Torlonia. According to the article, Princess Maria was the daughter of Mrs. Drexel Palmer-Hyde from Philadelphia and Prince Vittorio Alesandro di Torlonia. The article went into great detail about the royal couple's lavish ceremony, attire, and jewels. Readers eventually began to doubt the story's validity because the source of the writing was obscure; some wondered whether the article had been submitted by letter, as it had not been credited to any press outside Honolulu. Fantastical stories of the so-called royal couple circulated through The Honolulu Advertiser's society section, leading other publications, such as the Honolulu Newsweek, to proclaim the story a sham. Bob Krauss, a columnist who continued Amalu's controversial newspaper column "The Special World of Sammy Amalu" in the latter years of Amalu's life, asked the then-elderly Amalu about this wedding to the princess. According to Krauss, Amalu seemed surprised by the 1946 article and claimed to have been married three years earlier to a Mrs. Irmgard Spaur von Bohlen in Jamaica. According to Amalu, the two were divorced a year later, in 1942. After this divorce, Amalu claimed to have married Maria, who was referred to as "Mimi".

Some in the Hawaiian community have speculated that Amalu was māhū, a third-gendered person in the middle of the gender spectrum. Amalu was medically discharged from his position as a U.S. Army private on the grounds of homosexuality; when questioned about it, Amalu always denied the allegation.

== Career ==
Amalu was known for pushing the boundaries of social norms in his writing. While incarcerated at Folsom Prison in 1967, serving time for embezzlement, Amalu secured a position as a columnist for The Honolulu Advertiser. He made his way into this position by writing letters to his former Punahou School classmate and the editor of the Advertiser, Thurston Twigg-Smith. Twigg-Smith was the grandson of the Hawaiian annexationist Lorrin A. Thurston, who founded The Honolulu Advertiser. The column, called "The World of Sammy Amalu", began in 1968. Amalu wrote political and social commentary on gun and prison reform, sexuality, prison life, political issues in Hawaiʻi, and Kānaka Maoli traditions, genealogy, and history. In 1968, Folsom Prison's warden stopped Amalu's columns because prison officials had grown uncomfortable with Amalu's work. Readers protested and called for the columns to be reinstated; some appealed to then-Governor of California Ronald Reagan to support overturning the decision. Amalu's case was taken up by the civil rights lawyer George T. Davis, and Amalu's columns soon began again.

In 1970, Amalu was released from prison on parole. Upon returning to Honolulu, Amalu was given a full-time columnist position with The Honolulu Advertiser.

== Later years and death ==
In 1976, Amalu became paralyzed below the waist after an embolism, but he continued to make public appearances. In 1984, Amalu testified in defense of Gertrude K. Toledo in her husband's murder trial. Toledo was later cleared of any suspicion in her husband's death. Two years later, in 1986, Amalu died. Sixteen years before his death, Amalu had published his own obituary, which read:

Sing no sad songs over my mortal dust. Nor come to me weeping. I was born of an ancient line of a high and princely house. I have known a true friend. I have loved a good woman. I have fathered a son. I have known tears. I have tasted victory; I have sipped of failure. Is that not enough? Say only this of me when I am no more: He was a child of a princess, and the dust of this flesh was fashioned of Hawaiʻi's soil!
