= Kawaiahaʻo Church =

Church in Hawaii, United States

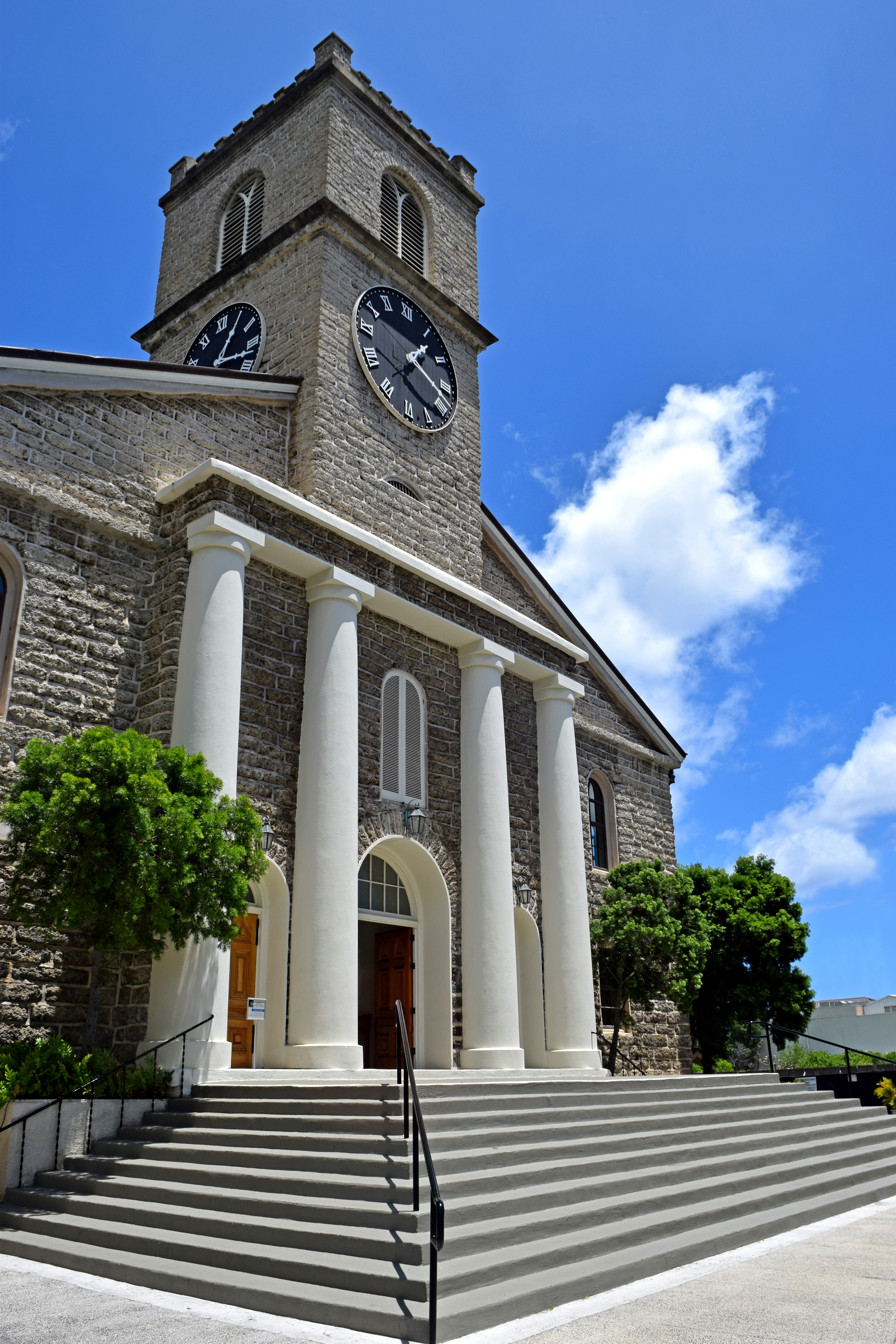
- Kawaiahaʻo Church is known as the "Westminster Abbey of Hawaiʻi": site of royal weddings, inaugurations, installations, christenings, funerals and tombs.
- Kawaiahaʻo Church
- Location: 957 Punchbowl Street; Honolulu, Oʻahu, Hawaiʻi
- Country: United States
- Language(s): English and Hawaiian
- Denomination: United Church of Christ
- Website: www.kawaiahao.org

History
- Status: Church

Architecture
- Functional status: Active
- Style: Neoclassical; Mediterranean Revival
- Years built: 1836–1842

Administration
- Division: Hawaii Conference UCC

Clergy
- Pastor: Kenneth Makuakāne (Kahu)
- Kawaiahao Church and Mission Houses
- U.S. National Register of Historic Places
- U.S. National Historic Landmark
- Location within Hawaii
- Location: 957 Punchbowl Street and 553 S. King Street, Honolulu, Hawaii
- Coordinates: 21°18′15″N 157°51′28″W
- Area: 8.8 acres (3.6 ha)
- Built: 1836–1842
- Architect: Hiram Bingham
- NRHP reference No.: 66000294

Significant dates
- Added to NRHP: October 15, 1966
- Designated NHL: December 29, 1962

Kawaiahaʻo Church is a historic Congregational church located in Downtown Honolulu on the Hawaiian Island of Oʻahu. The church, along with the Mission Houses, comprise the Hawaiian Mission Houses Historic Site, which was designated a U.S. National Historic Landmark (NHL) in 1962. In 1966 it and all other NHLs were included in the first issuance of the National Register of Historic Places.

At one time the central church of the Kingdom of Hawaiʻi and chapel of the Hawaiian royal family, the church is popularly known as “Hawaiʻi's Westminster Abbey”. The name comes from the Hawaiian noun phrase ka wai a Haʻo (“the water of Haʻo”), because its location had a spring and freshwater pool of a High Chiefess named Haʻo. It has also been called hale pule lahui (“Great Stone Church”), the Hawaiian Tabernacle (luakini), the Mother Church, the Kingʻs Church, the Kingʻs Chapel, and the "Aliʻi Church".

Today, Kawaiahaʻo continues to use the Hawaiian language for parts of its services. It is the oldest church on Oʻahu and one of the oldest standing Christian places of worship in Hawaiʻi, although four thatched churches stood at or near the site of the present coral church. The oldest standing church is Mokuaikaua Church on the Island of Hawaiʻi. Denominationally, it is part of the United Church of Christ.

== History ==
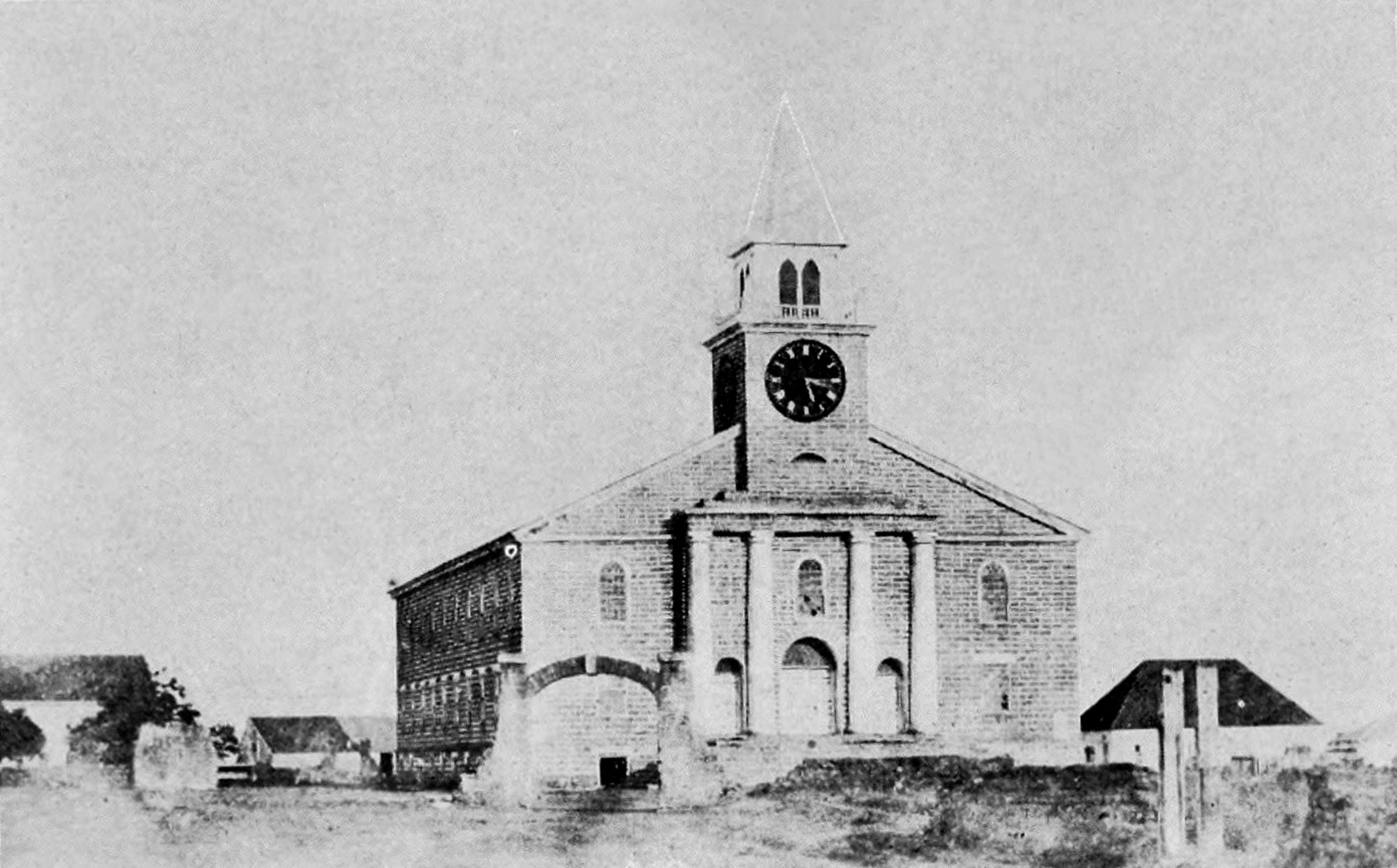
First known photograph of the church, taken in 1857 by Hugo Stangenwald

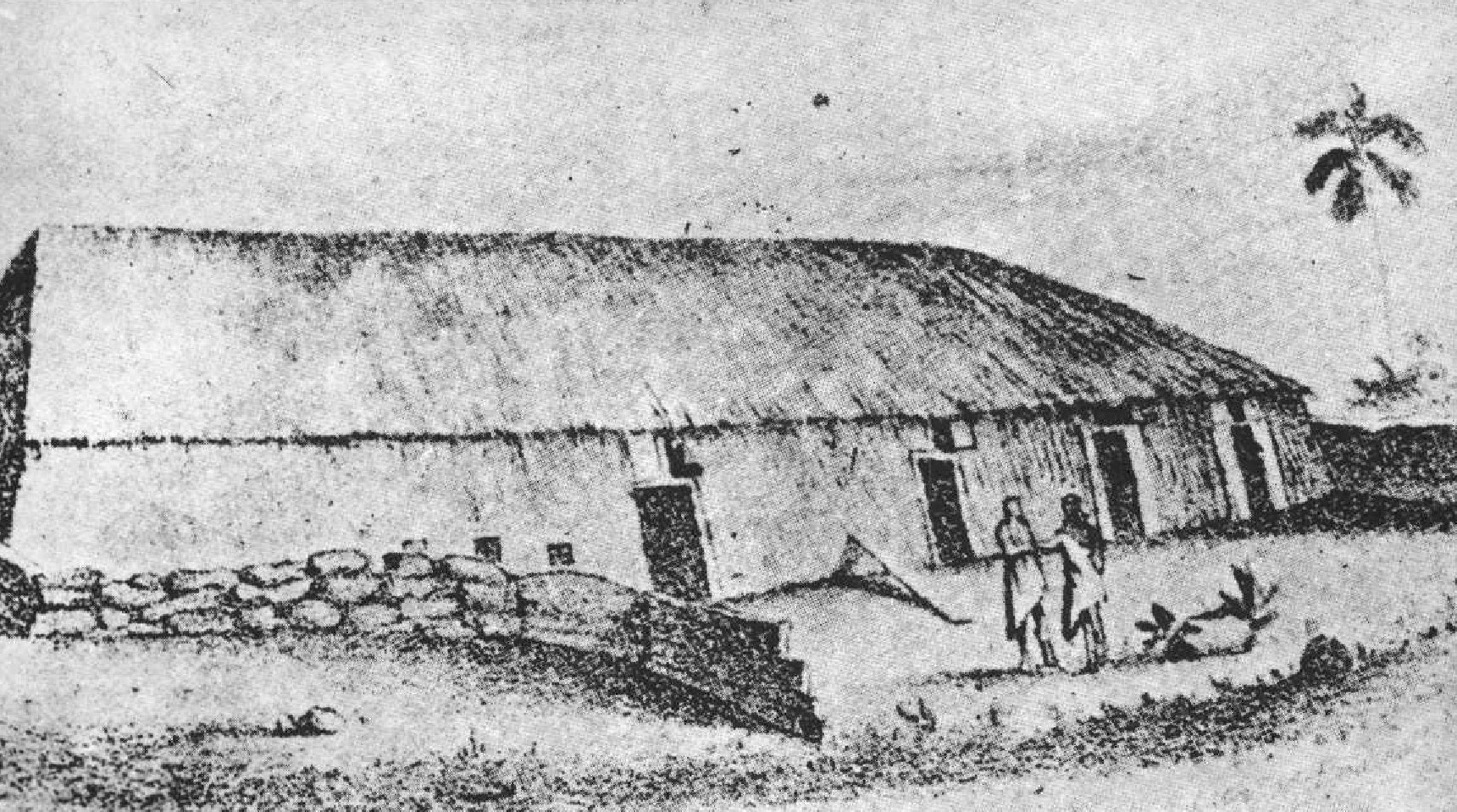
The grass church that preceded the stone church seated 4000 people; by Francis Allyn Olmsted

The Kawaiaha'o mission was started in 1820. The stone building of Kawaiahaʻo Church was commissioned by the regency of Kaʻahumanu, during the reigns of Kamehameha II and Kamehameha III. Designed by Rev. Hiram Bingham in the New England style of the Hawaiian missionaries, it was constructed between 1836 and 1842 of some 14,000 thousand-pound slabs of coral rock quarried from an offshore reef on the southern coast of Oʻahu. Hawaiian divers dove three to six metres below sea-level to chisel out each coral block with hand tools, and the blocks then were transported from the reef onto the shore.

The church house rivaled the concurrent construction of the Cathedral of Our Lady of Peace by the Roman Catholic Apostolic Vicariate of the Hawaiian Islands. Construction began on that churchhouse in 1840 and was substantially completed in 1843, one year after the completion of Kawaiahaʻo Church.

The name Kawaiahaʻo was not applied to the site until 1853.

Kawaiahaʻo Church was frequented by the chiefs of the Hawaiian Islands as well as the members of the reigning Kamehameha dynasty and Kalākaua dynasty. Kamehameha III, Kamehameha IV, Kamehameha V and Kalakaua took their oaths of office to their constitutions at Kawaiahaʻo Church. State burials were also held at the church as well the baptisms of aliʻi including aliʻi members who would eventually convert to other denominations or faiths.

Today, the upper gallery of the sanctuary is adorned with 20 portraits of Hawaiian royalty (Aliʻi). The body of King Lunalilo, who preferred burial in a church cemetery to burial in the Royal Mausoleum, is buried in a crypt along with his father near the front courtyard.

But Kawaiahaʻo Church was not the only site of royal worship in the Islands. Kamehameha IV and his wife Emma were devout members of the Church of England and established the Anglican Church of Hawaiʻi, which evolved into the present-day Episcopal Diocese of Hawaiʻi after the islands were annexed by the United States and later gained statehood. The royal couple commissioned the construction of the Cathedral Church of Saint Andrew, which replaced Kawaiahaʻo Church as the principal centre of royal worship. Kamehameha V, Kalākaua, and Liliʻuokalani (after the rebellion which overthrew the kingdom) preferred to use the cathedral – even though, before her reign, then Princess Liliʻuokalani had directed the choir of Kawaiahaʻo Church. When Liliʻuokalani died in 1917, she lay in state in the church for a week before her funeral at Iolani Palace.

== People associated with the church ==
Other well-known persons associated with the church include:

- Kīnaʻu, kuhina nui of the Hawaiian Kingdom;
- Timothy Kamalehua Haʻalilio, the Hawaiian envoy that helped to secure Hawaiian independence;
- John (Ioane) Iʻi, an advisor to Kamehameha III and teacher at the Chiefʻs Children School;
- Emma Kaʻili Metcalf Beckley Nakuina, historian and the first record female judge in Hawaiʻi;
- Levi Haʻalelea, an advisor to Kamehameha III;
- John Thomas Gulick, a missionary to Micronesia and head of the Hawaiian board of Foreign Missions to Oceania and the Philippines;
- Daniel Opunui, one of the first Protestant missionaries in Micronesia was member of Kawaiahaʻo Church before Kaumakapili Church was built;
- David Kinimaka, adopted brother of King Kalakaua and officer in the Hawaiian Royal Guards;
- Henry Berger, band master of the Royal Hawaiian Band and is buried at Kawaiahaʻo Church.
- Agnes Baldwin Alexander, born in Honolulu in 1875 to William DeWitt Alexander and Abigail Charlotte Alexander, née Baldwin. Miss Alexander was a scion of two of Hawaii’s most illustrious Christian missionary families — the Alexanders and the Baldwins. In 1900 Agnes discovered the Baháʼí Faith while in Rome on a tour of Europe, which she had undertaken after a severe illness. In 1901 she returned to Hawaii as its first Baháʼí.
- Abraham Akaka, late pastor of the Kawaiahaʻo Church and most remembered for his role in the US Civil Rights Movement.

=== List of Nā Kahu (senior pastors) ===
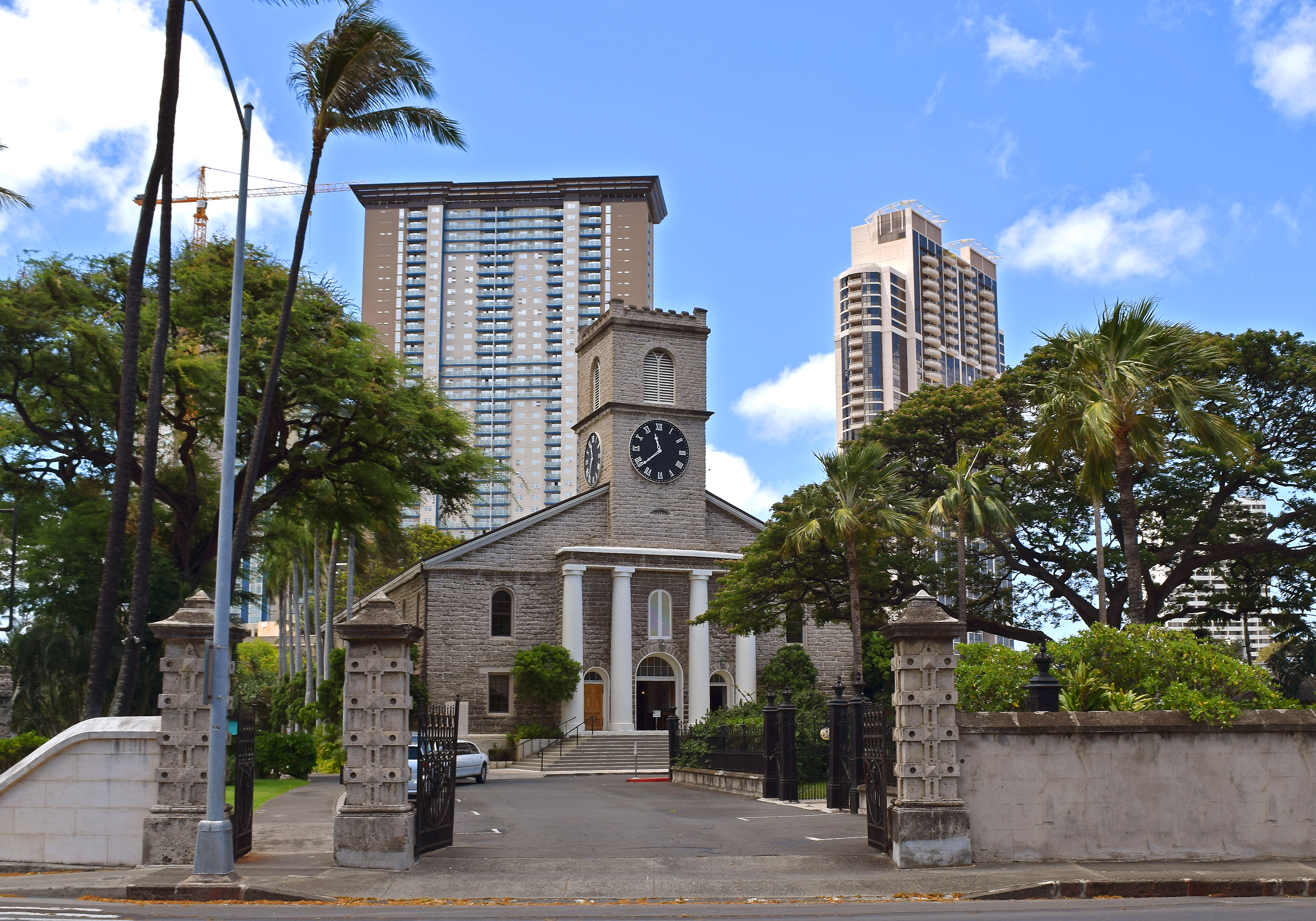
Kawaiaha'o Church and front gate

- Hiram Bingham (1820–1840)
- Richard Armstrong (1840–1848)
- Ephraim Weston Clark (1848–1863)
- Henry Hodges Parker (1863–1917)
- Akaiko Akana (1918–1933)
- William Kamau (1934–1940)
- Edward Kahale (1940–1957)
- Abraham Akaka (1957–1984)
- William H. Kaina (1984–1997)
- James Fung (2000–2002)
- Curtis P. Kekuna (2004–2017)
- Kenneth Makuakāne (2018–present)

=== List of interim pastors ===
- Ronald F.K. Ching – Intentional interim (1998)
- James Kimo Mersberg – Intentional interim (2017–2018)

== See also ==
- List of the oldest buildings in Hawaii
