= Ethel Moseley Damon =

Author and historian (1883–1965)

Ethel Damon
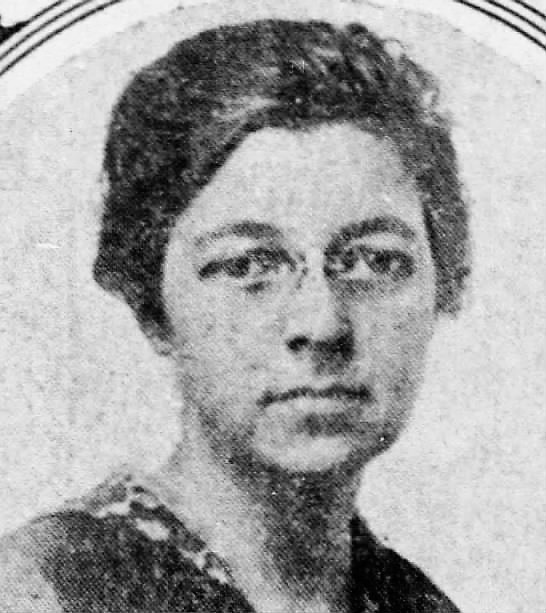
- Ethel Moseley Damon in 1918
- Born: Ethel Moseley Damon; April 12, 1883; Honolulu, Kingdom of Hawaii
- Died: April 1, 1965 (aged 81); Kauai, Hawaii, U.S.
- Education: Wellesley College
- Occupations: Teacher, writer, historian

Ethel Moseley Damon (April 12, 1883 – April 1, 1965) was a teacher, writer and historian who served with the Red Cross in Europe during World War I, and was decorated by Elisabeth of Bavaria, Queen of Belgium and by the Mayor of Le Havre.

== Background and education ==
She was born April 12, 1883, in Honolulu in the Kingdom of Hawaii, as one of five children of Edward Chenery Damon (1848–1894), a retailer with JT Waterhouse and Company, and Cornelia Beckwith Damon (1857–1908). Ethel's brothers and sisters were Julia, Maurice, Fred, and William.

Her maternal grandparents Maurice B. Beckwith (1824–1881) and Sarah Moseley Beckwith (1831–1870) arrived in Hawaii in 1855 from Massachusetts to help run the Royal School. Her paternal grandparents Samuel C. Damon (1815–1885) and Julia Sherman Mills Damon (1817–1890) arrived in Hawaii in 1845 as missionaries for the American Seaman's Friend Society. Samuel was the founding publisher of The Friend periodical, and Julia was the first president of the Stranger's Friend Society in Honolulu.

Ethel attended Honolulu's private college preparatory Punahou School, and was Valedictorian at her 1901 graduation. After training at Honolulu Normal school, she taught English at that same institution for a couple of years. She later attended Wellesley College in Massachusetts, receiving her BA degree in 1909. Upon her return to Hawaii, she taught multiple languages at Punahou until the beginning of World War I.

== World War I ==
With the outbreak of war, Johns Hopkins pediatrician Edwards A. Park, working with the American Red Cross Belgian Commission, headed the Children's Hospital in Le Havre as a facility for refugee Belgian children. He appointed Mabel Isabel Wilcox as head nurse in supervision over Ethel and 14 other nurses.

In a 1918 letter printed in the Honolulu Star-Bulletin, Ethel related the effects of war on the French population. Quartered at the Hôtel de Ville in Paris, she awaited the arrival of Mabel and Dr. Park. In the interim, she had been working for a district nurse. On the evening of their arrival, Paris was in the middle of an air raid blackout, which they later learned had been one of the most severe air raids in Paris up to that date. They remained in the area providing assistance for several days, as Ethel witnessed cars and trucks parked in the streets, ready to flee on a moment's notice, and the courage of a people facing uncertainty. While visiting a tuberculosis sanitarium at Sceaux outside of Paris, they heard two loud explosions, " ... we looked at once in the direction of Paris to see a great mass of black smoke begin to rise ..." only to find out later the explosions had occurred where they had been working.

At Le Havre, and wherever needed in France, they provided medical care and a safe haven for the children, often putting themselves in harm's way behind enemy lines to assist refugee women. In recognition of their war-time services, Mabel and Ethel were decorated with the Queen Elisabeth Medal by the Queen Elisabeth of Belgium and the Bronze Medal of the City of Le Havre by the Mayor of Le Havre.

== Final years ==
Ethel had a prolific writing career on a local level. Concentrating on Hawaii's history, she produced historical pageants, wrote plays, books and pamphlets, and published historic papers. She devoted much of her post-World War I years in documenting Hawaii's history. Never married, she died at her Kauai home on April 1, 1965.

== Published works ==
(Select list)

- The Seventy-Fifth Anniversary Pageant – Punahou. Author. 1916. OCLC 941703481 – via HathiTrust.
- The Romance of Reality: A Historical Play in Two Acts. 1920. OCLC 701329041 – via HathiTrust.
- Hawaiian Mission Centennial Historical Pageant, 1820–1920. 1921. OCLC 16325359.
- "Pictures of the Hawaii from 1823". The Friend. 91: 106–108. 1922.
- Early Hawaiian Churches. 1924. OCLC 701328038 – via HathiTrust.
- The Story of the Three Old Buildings in Honolulu which originally housed the First Christian Mission to the Sandwich Islands. Hawaiian Mission Children's Society. 1926. OCLC 4058983 – via HathiTrust.
- Father Bond of Kohala. The Friend. 1927. OCLC 429667904 – via HathiTrust.
- Damon, Ethel M.; Isenberg, Mary Dorothea Rice (1931). Koamalu; a story of pioneers on Kauai, and of what they built in that island garden. Priv. print. [Honolulu star-bulletin press] – via HathiTrust.
- David Belden Lyman: Sarah Koiner Joiner Lyman, 1832–1932. Place of publication not identified. 1932. OCLC 707590638.
- The Stone Church at Kawaiahao, 1820–1944. Trustees of Kawaiahao Church. 1945. OCLC 610133650.
- Siloama, the Church of the Healing Spring: the Story of Certain Almost Forgotten Protestant Churches. Hawaiian Board of Missions. 1948. OCLC 4586600.
- Letters from the life of Abner and Lucy Wilcox, 1836–1869. Privately printed. 1950. OCLC 16333414.
- Sanford Ballard Dole and His Hawaii: With an Analysis of Justice Dole's Legal Opinions. Palo Alto, CA: Pacific Books. 1957. OCLC 58754274. Archived from the original on 2017-12-22 – via Questia.
- Samuel Chenery Damon: Chaplain and Friend of Seamen, Historian, Traveler, Diplomat, Doctor of Divinity, Journalist, Genial Companion, Genealogist. Published under the sponsorship of the Hawaiian Mission Children's Society. 1966. OCLC 16341383.

== Bibliography ==
- Hawaiian Mission Children's Society (1901). American Protestant Missionaries to Hawaii. Hawaiian Mission Children's Society – via HathiTrust.
- Peterson, Barbara Bennett, ed. (1984). Notable women of Hawaii. Honolulu: University of Hawaii Press. pp. 403–405. ISBN 978-0-8248-0820-4.
