= Dillingham (surname) =

Dillingham is a surname. Notable people with the surname include:

- Benjamin Franklin Dillingham (1844–1918), American businessman
- Charles Dillingham (1868–1934), American theatre manager and producer
- Craig Dillingham (born 1958), American country music artist
- Emma Smith Dillingham (1844–1920), American educator, poet, and philanthropist
- Francis Dillingham (died 1625), English Protestant scholar, cleric and Bible translator
- Jay B. Dillingham (1910–2007), American businessman
- Kate Dillingham, American cellist
- Kathleen Dillingham, American politician
- Kenny Dillingham (born c.1990), American football coach
- Louise Olga Gaylord Dillingham (1885–1964) American civic leader in Hawaii
- Pat Dillingham (born 1983), American football player
- Paul Dillingham (1799–1891), American lawyer and politician.
- Richard Dillingham (1823–1850), American Quaker school teacher
- Rick Dillingham (1952–1994), American ceramic artist
- Rob Dillingham, (born 2005), American basketball player
- Steven Dillingham, 25th director of the United States Census Bureau
- Theophilus Dillingham (1613–1678), English churchman and academic
- Walter F. Dillingham (1875–1963), American industrialist and businessman
- William Dillingham (academic) (c. 1617–1689), English academic
- William P. Dillingham (1843–1923), American attorney and politician
