= Watters =

Watters may refer to:

- Watters (surname), a list of notable people with the name
- Watters, Pennsylvania, an unincorporated community in Butler County, Pennsylvania, United States
- Watters Gallery, a former art gallery in Sydney, Australia
- Watters Smith Memorial State Park, a historical park in West Virginia

== See also ==
- Watterstown, Wisconsin, a town in Grant County, Wisconsin, United States
- Waters (name)
- Watter (disambiguation)
