= Hānaiakamalama =

Historic house in Hawaii, United States

- Queen Emma Summer Palace
- U.S. National Register of Historic Places
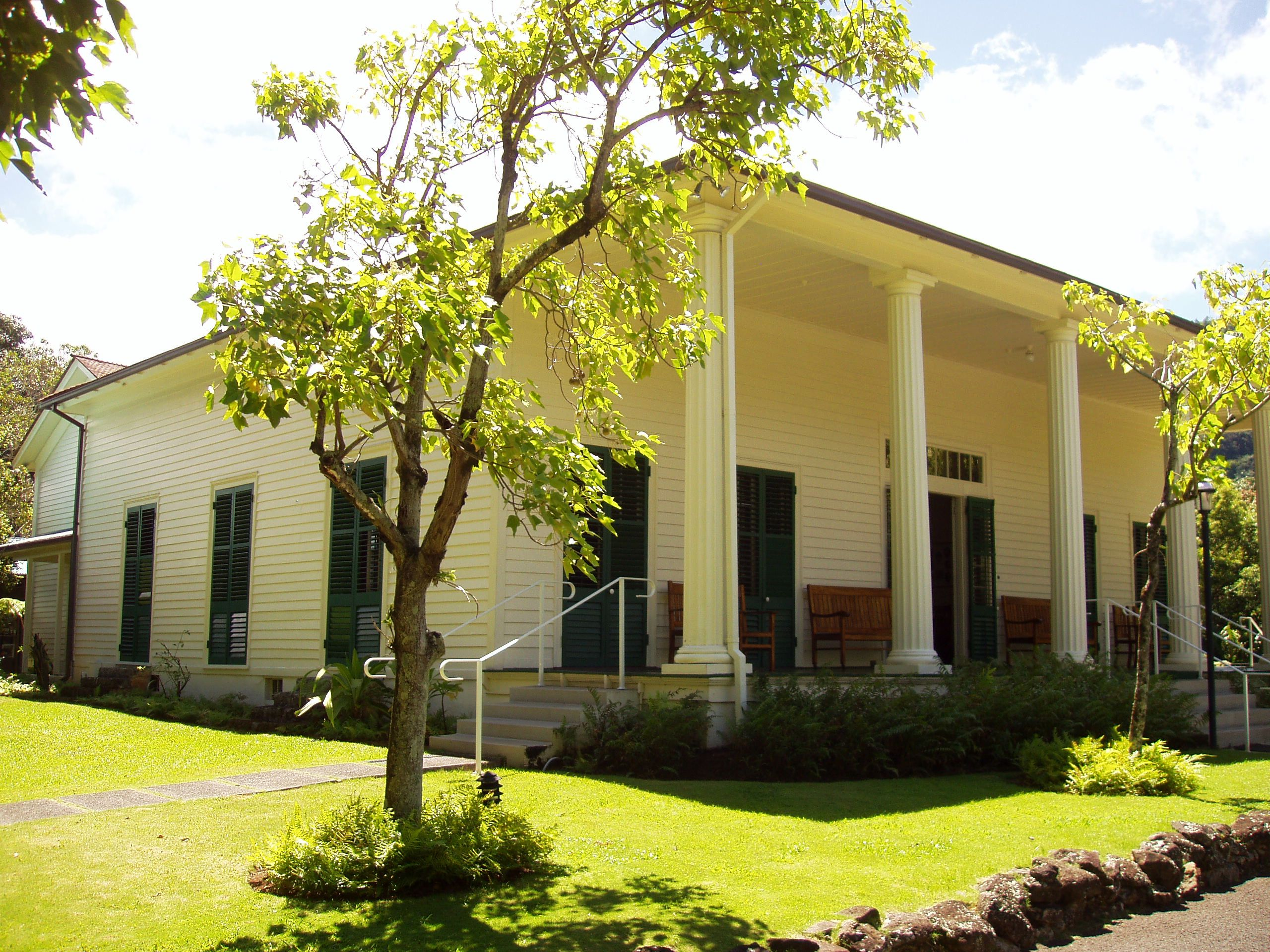
- Hānaiakamalama (Queen Emma Summer Palace)

- Location within Hawaii
- Location: 2913 Pali Highway, Honolulu, Hawaii
- Coordinates: 21°20′08″N 157°50′20″W
- Area: 5 acres (2.0 ha)
- Built: 1848
- NRHP reference No.: 72000420
- Added to NRHP: August 7, 1972

Hānaiakamalama or Queen Emma Summer Palace, served as a retreat for Queen Emma of Hawaii from 1857 to 1885, as well as for her husband King Kamehameha IV, and their son, Prince Albert Edward. It is a now a historic landmark, museum, and tourist site located at 2913 Pali Highway, less than a ten-minute drive outside of downtown Honolulu, Hawaii. The museum is open daily from 9:00 a.m. to 4:00 p.m., and is maintained with entrance fees, revenue from the gift shop, and other funds raised by the Daughters of Hawaii.

== History ==
Hānaiakamalama is located in the Nuʻuanu Valley, long a popular location first for Hawaiian chiefs and royalty, and later for non-Hawaiian residents, who found the cooler climate of the uplands more comfortable than downtown Honolulu. The Hawaiian name means either the Southern Cross or is the name of a benevolent goddess.

The frame of the home was built in Boston, in 1848, and shipped to Hawaiʻi via Cape Horn. It was then assembled on a property purchased by John Lewis from the Kingdom of Hawaiʻi . It had six rooms, one story, and a porch with Doric columns in the Greek Revival style.

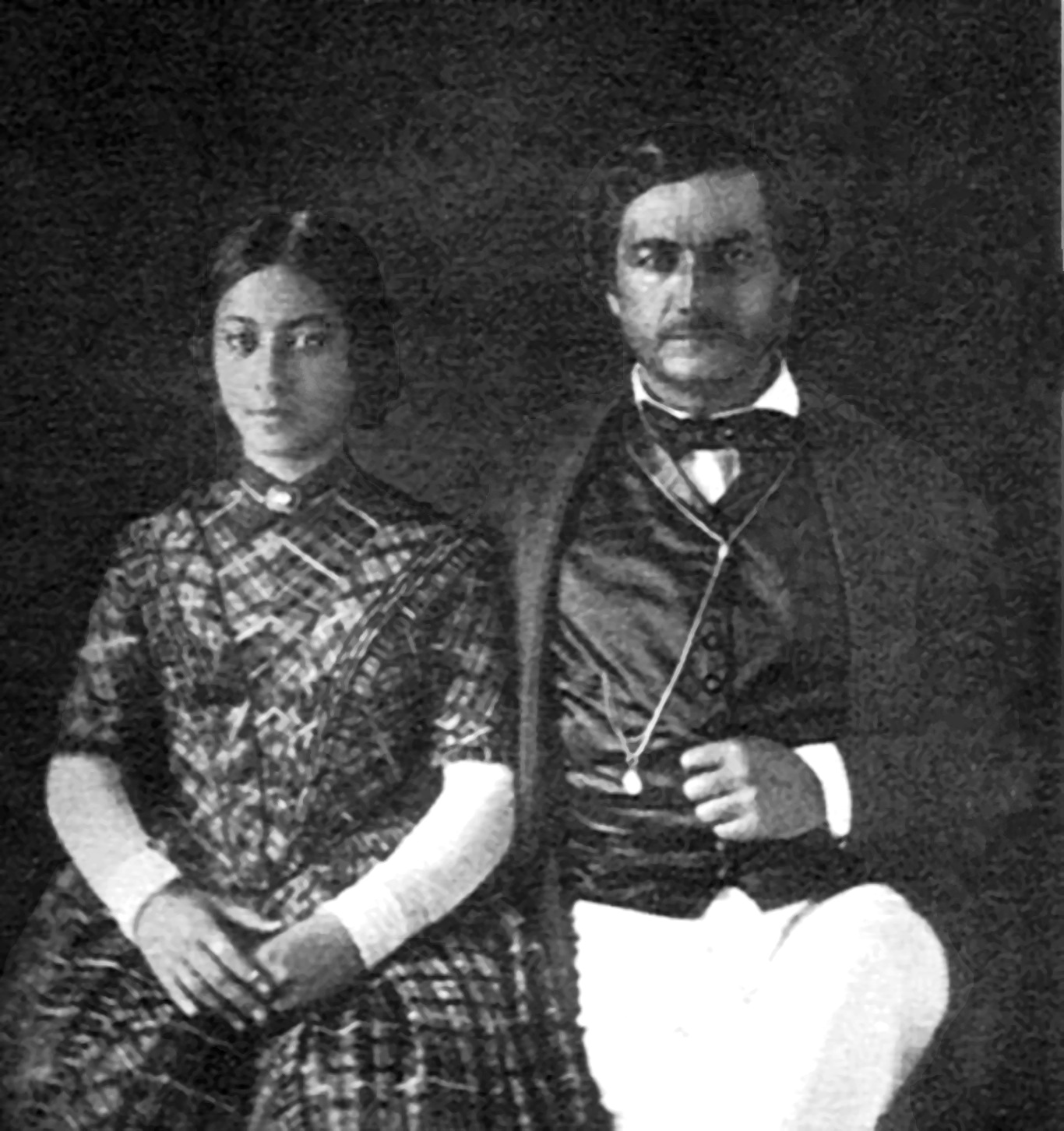
Keoni Ana and his niece Queen Emma.

In 1850, two years after it was completed, the home was purchased at auction by Keoni Ana (John Young II) for $6,000. Young owned the estate until 1857, when he gave it to his niece, Queen Emma. In 1869, Queen Emma added a large room called the Edinburgh Room to the rear of the structure, in preparation for the visit of the Duke of Edinburgh.

After Queen Emma's death in 1885, the Kingdom of Hawaiʻi bought the estate. In 1911, Territorial Governor Walter F. Frear declared it a park to be maintained by the City and County of Honolulu. At one point, plans were made to build a baseball park over the site. However, the Daughters of Hawaii were able to acquire the building and have since restored and maintained it as a museum. The site was placed on the National Register of Historic Places in the 1970s.

== Current status ==
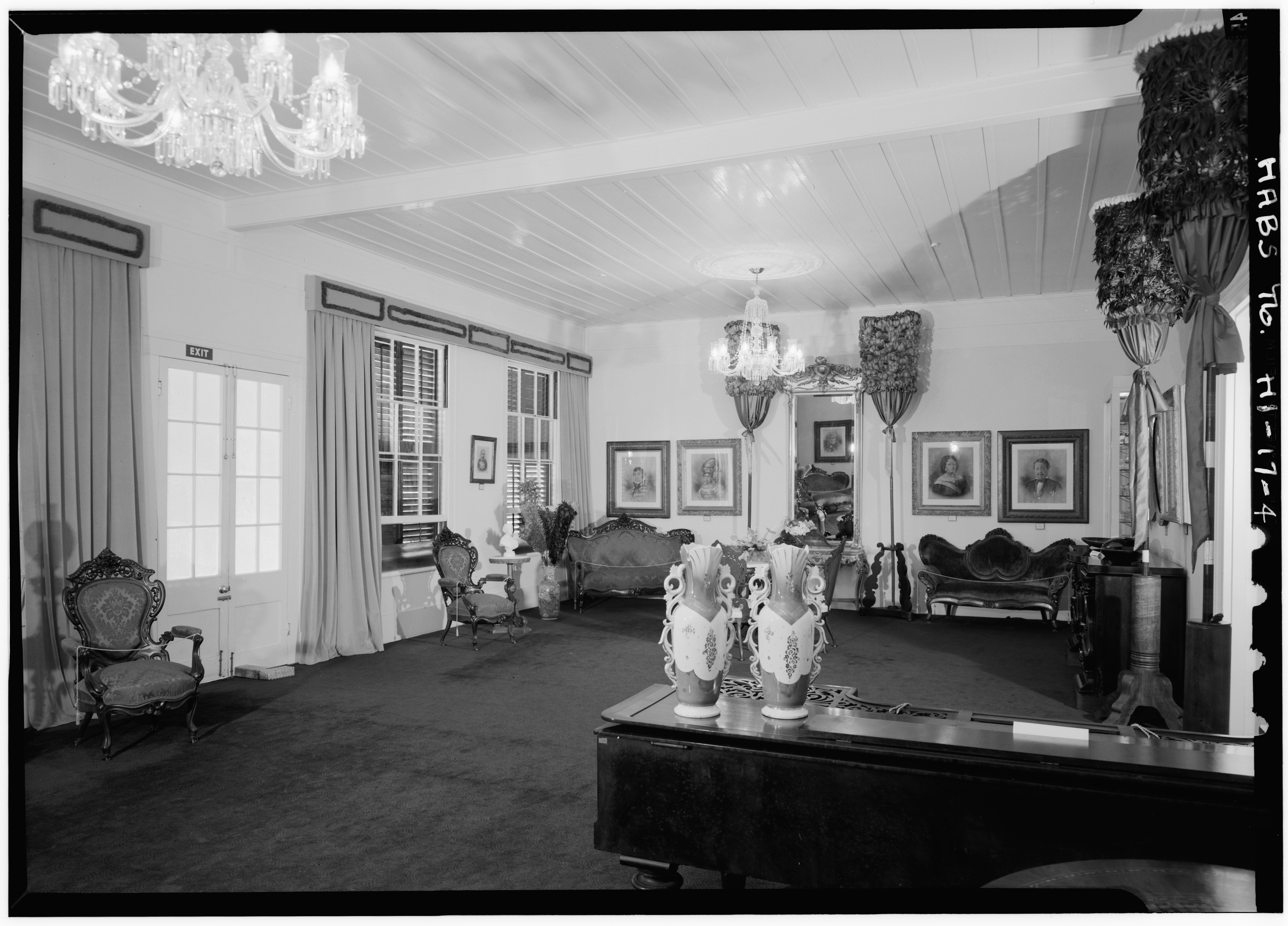
Edinburgh room at Queen Emma's Summer Palace

Today, Queen Emma's Summer Palace sits on a 2.16-acre (0.87 ha) plot owned by the Queen Emma Estate, and maintained by the Daughters of Hawaii. The grounds are extensively landscaped, with many plants native to the Hawaiian Islands.

The house itself is a museum displaying Queen Emma's possessions, along with those of her husband, King Kamehameha IV, their son, Prince Albert Edward, and other members of the Hawaiian royal families. The rooms and their principal contents are as follows:

- Entrance Hall - feather standards (kāhili); royal coat of arms.
- Front Bedroom (originally the Dining Room) - Large bed of Acacia koa; Prince Albert's cradle; Queen Emma's sleigh bed; Prince Albert Edward's bathtub
- Parlor - Queen Emma's baby grand piano; 3 feather capes; koa dining table and chairs; imari porcelain jardinière given by Emperor Meiji to King Kalākaua
- Cloak Room - Royal feather cloak
- Back Bedroom - Queen Emma's koa bed; Prince Albert Edward's koa crib; display cabinet with Prince Albert's velvet suit, etc.
- Center Hall - Silver christening vessel given by Queen Victoria; tiger claw necklace; stereopticon given by Napoleon III on Queen Emma's visit to France in 1865; kapa cloth artifacts; feather standards (kāhili)
- Edinburgh Room - Royal cabinet with china given by Queen Victoria; rosewood furniture; piano; chair and settee

The house also contains a number of portraits of historical interest. Subjects include William Charles Lunalilo, John Young II, Julia Alapai, Bernice Pauahi Bishop, Kamehameha III, Kamehameha IV, Kamehameha V, Queen Emma of Hawaii, Prince Albert Edward Kauikeaouli, etc.

== Nearby sites of interest ==
Not far from Hānaiakamalama is the Pali Lookout, site of the battle of Nuʻuanu Pali, where Kamehameha I defeated the forces of the King of Oʻahu, consolidating his claim as monarch of the Hawaiian Islands.
