= Mary Dillingham Frear =

American poet

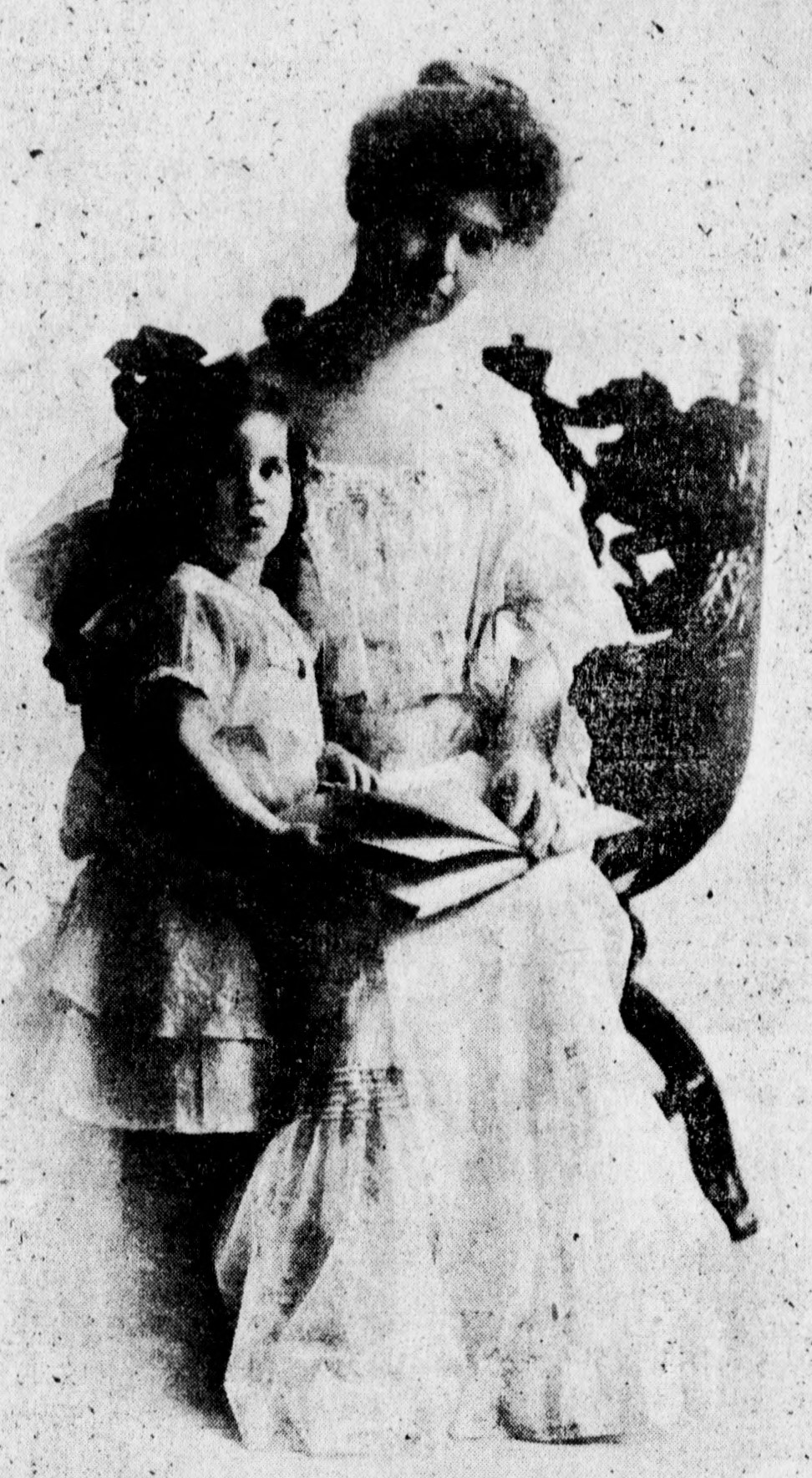

First Lady of the Territory of Hawaii
- In office 1907–1913
- Governor: Walter F. Frear
- Preceded by: Helen Strong Carter
- Succeeded by: Unknown

Personal details
- Born: Mary Emma Dillingham; June 30, 1870 Honolulu, Kingdom of Hawaii
- Died: January 17, 1951 (aged 80) Honolulu, Territory of Hawaii
- Spouse: Walter F. Frear (1893–1948; his death)
- Children: Two
- Parents: Benjamin Franklin Dillingham (father); Emma Louise Smith (mother)

Mary Emma Dillingham Frear (1870–1951) was a Hawaiian civic leader. She served as the First Lady of the Territory of Hawaii from 1907 to 1913, and was a regent of the University of Hawaii for two decades. The granddaughter of missionaries, she was the first Hawaii-born wife of a governor of Hawaii.

== Background and family ==
She was born as Mary Emma Dillingham in Honolulu on June 30, 1870, but was nicknamed May. Her father Benjamin Franklin Dillingham was the founder of the Oahu Railway and Land Company. Her mother Emma Louise Smith was the daughter of missionaries Lowell Smith and Abigail Willis Tenney, who arrived in Honolulu on May 31, 1833. They were part of the sixth company of missionaries from New London, Connecticut. Her brother Walter F. Dillingham became a successful industrialist in Hawaii. Two other brothers died in infancy. Marion, her only sister, became the wife of Presbyterian minister John Pinney Erdman.

At Punahou School in Honolulu, her Greek language instructor was Yale graduate Walter F. Frear. When she enrolled at Wellesley College in Massachusetts, he returned to Yale Law School to pursue his LL.D. After graduating from their respective schools, they returned to Honolulu and married on August 1, 1893. They adopted two daughters, Virginia and Margaret.

== Public life ==
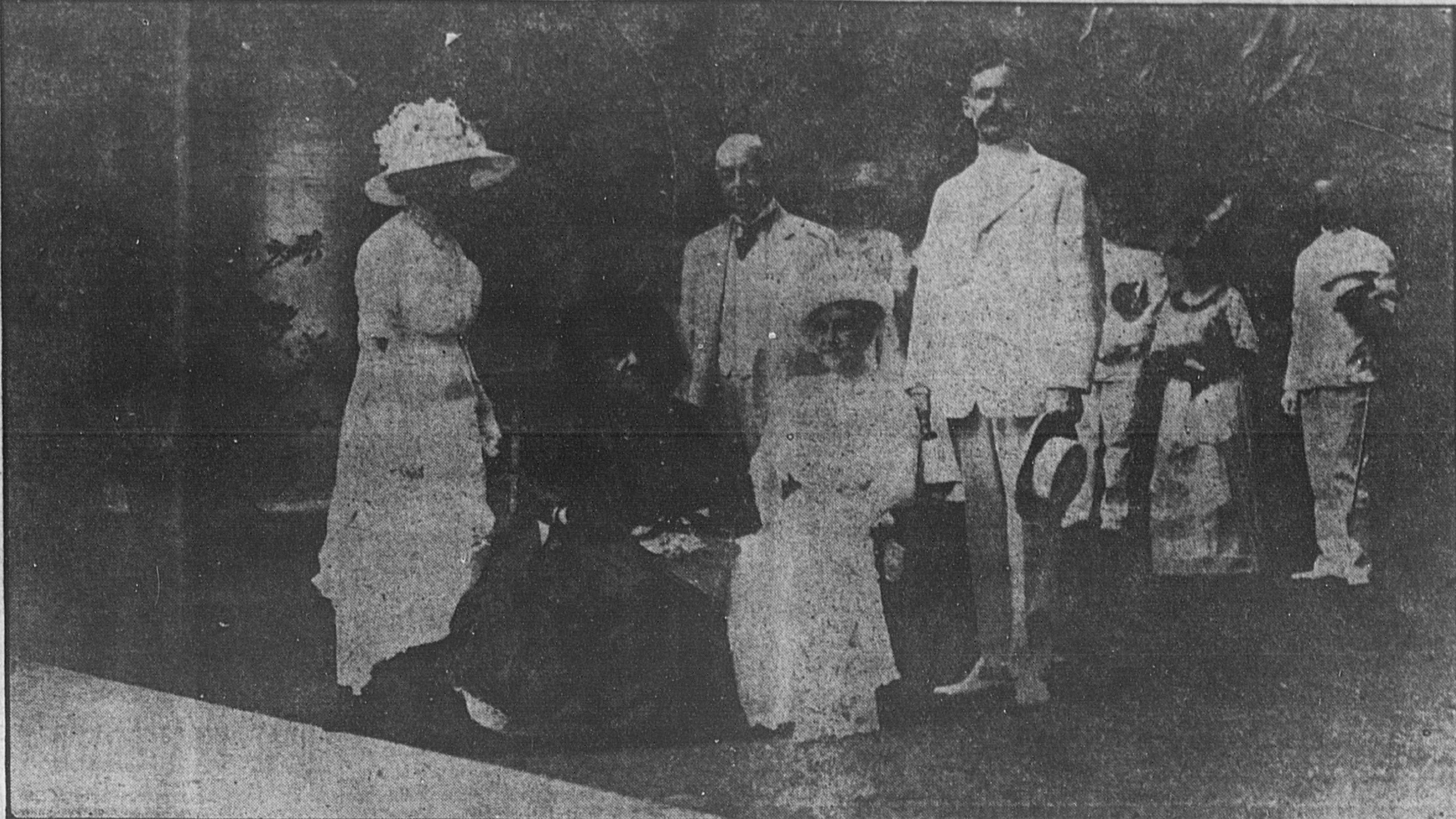
Mary Dillingham Frear (standing left) at a reception for Secretary of State Philander C. Knox, along with her husband and Queen Liliuokalani (seated dressed in black), 1912

Walter was an associate justice of the Supreme Court of both the Provisional Government of Hawaii and the Republic of Hawaii, and chief justice of the Territory of Hawaii. In 1907, he was appointed Governor of the Territory of Hawaii.

Mary was a poet, writer and community activist. Her poems were published in newspapers, eventually compiled into books. Two of her books were about the flora of Hawaii. She published a book on the lives of her grandparents Lowell Smith and Abigail Willis Tenney. Known for her community involvement, she was active with a local theatre group, was instrumental in building the YWCA in Honolulu, was a member of the Daughters of Hawaii, and was a regent of the University of Hawaii for two decades. During World War II, she sat on the advisory board of the Hawaiian Chapter of the committee to Defend America by Aiding the Allies. Among their endeavors was fund raising to provide ambulance trailers and soup kitchens to the allies.

The Frears built a home in 1908 at 1434 Punahou Street. It was considered a mansion in its day. Upon moving in, they held a housewarming party for hundreds of guests. They continued throughout their lives to make the home available for groups who needed accommodations for social gatherings or business meetings.

== Later years and death ==
Walter F. Frear died January 22, 1948. Mary died January 18, 1951. Upon her death, their mansion was bequeathed to Punahou School.

== Works ==
- Frear, Mary Dillingham (1911). My Islands, Verses. F. D. Beattys & Co. – via HathiTrust.
- Frear, Mary Dillingham (1927). Hawaiian Days and Holidays and Days of Long Ago. The Stratford company – via HathiTrust.
- Frear, Mary Emma Dillingham (1929). Our Familiar Island Trees. R. G. Badger – via HathiTrust.
- Frear, Mary Emma (Dillingham) (1934). Lowell and Abigail, A Realistic Idyll. Yale University Press – via HathiTrust.
- Frear, Mary Emma Dillingham; McLean, Olive Gale (1938). Flowers of Hawaii. Dodd, Mead – via HathiTrust.
- Frear, Mary Dillingham (1940). Isle of Dreams: Verses. Printed by Advertiser Pub. Co., Ltd. – via HathiTrust.
