= Edwin Oscar Hall =

American businessman (1810-1883)

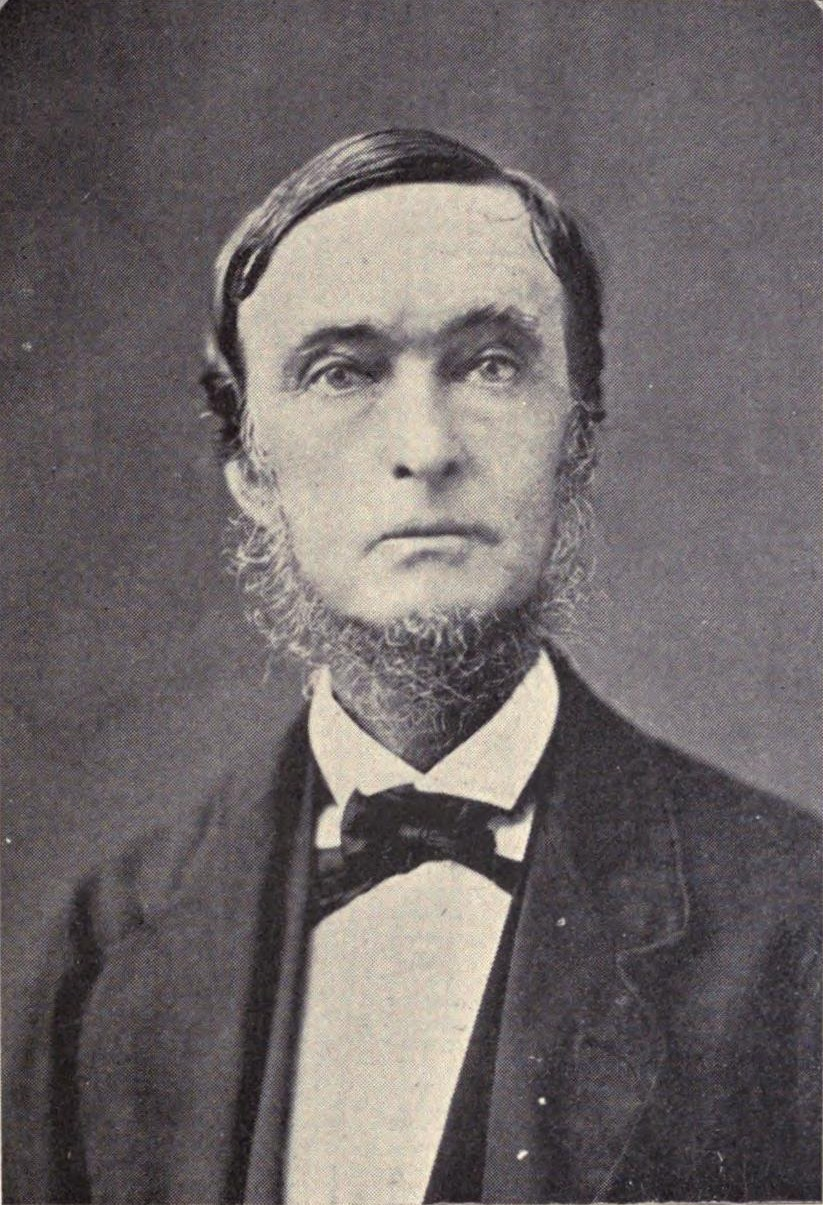

Kingdom of Hawaii Minister of Finance
- In office September 6, 1849 – September 26, 1850
- Monarch: Kamehameha III
- Preceded by: Gerrit P. Judd
- Succeeded by: Gerrit P. Judd

Kingdom of Hawaii Minister of the Interior
- In office January 10, 1873 – February 17, 1874
- Monarchs: Lunalilo; Kalākaua
- Preceded by: Ferdinand William Hutchison
- Succeeded by: Hermann A. Widemann

Personal details
- Born: October 21, 1810 Walpole, New Hampshire, United States
- Died: September 19, 1883 (aged 72) Falmouth, Maine, United States
- Resting place: Hawaii
- Spouse(s): Sarah Lyons Williams (m. 1834; died 1878) Mary Lyon Dame (m. 1878)
- Children: 4 (including Cornelia Hall Jones)
- Occupation: Printer

Edwin Oscar Hall (1810–1883) was a businessman who was appointed Minister of Finance by Kamehameha III, serving in that capacity for one year. He was subsequently appointed Minister of the Interior of the Kingdom of Hawaii on January 10, 1873, by King Lunalilo. After Lunalilo's death, he remained in the position until Kalākaua replaced him on February 17, 1874, with Hermann A. Widemann.

== Hawaii missionary ==
Born in 1810 at Walpole, New Hampshire, Edwin Hall was educated at Canandaigua Academy, New York, and trained for the printing trade in Detroit and New York City. Hall and his wife Sarah Lyons Williams were part of the Seventh Company of missionaries sent to the Kingdom of Hawaii by the American Board of Commissioners for Foreign Missions. On December 5, 1834, one month after their marriage, the couple sailed out of Boston for Hawaii, then known as the "Sandwich Islands", on the merchant ship Hellespont, docking in Honolulu Harbor on June 6, 1835. Also on board were bookbinder Henry Dimond and his wife, school teachers Lydia Brown and Elizabeth M. Hitchcock, and missionary Rev. Titus Coan and his wife. Hall, Dimond and the teachers were secular missionaries, rather than ordained ministers. Hitchcock was a sister to missionary Rev. Harvey Rexford Hitchcock on Molokai. On their June 6, 1835 arrival, the Halls were stationed in Honolulu.

== Businessman ==
After serving with the mission board for 15 years, Hall took over the editorial duties of the secular Honolulu newspaper The Polynesian. He soon formed his own mercantile business.

== Cabinet officer ==
Kamehameha III appointed Hall as temporary Minister of Finance in 1849, serving a one-year period in between two periods of service by Gerrit P. Judd.

In 1873, Hall was appointed Minister of the Interior by King Lunalilo. Upon Lunalilo's death, King Kalākaua formed his own cabinet, and Hall was replaced by Hermann A. Widemann on February 17, 1874.

== Death ==
Hall and his first wife had four children, including Cornelia Hall Jones. On her death, he married Mary Lyon Dame in 1878 in Pennsylvania. Hall died September 19, 1883, in Falmouth, Maine, but was buried in Honolulu.
