= La Pietra =

Hawai‘i School For Girls at La Pietra

Location
- 2933 Poni Moi Road; Honolulu, Hawaiʻi 96815; United States; 21°15′40″N 157°48′57″W

Information
- Type: Private, College-prep, Day
- Founded: 1964
- Head of school: Jennifer Grems
- Gender: Girls
- Average class size: 10
- Student to teacher ratio: 7:1
- Campus type: Urban
- Colors: Royal and Powder Blue
- Athletics conference: ILH
- Mascot: Panthers
- Accreditation: WASC
- Affiliations: NCGS
- Website: www.lapietra.edu

Hawai‘i School for Girls at La Pietra is a private school for girls in grades 6–12 located at 2933 Poni Moi Road, Honolulu, Hawaii. Founded in 1964 by Lorraine Cooke, it moved to the current La Pietra campus in 1969. The school is at the foot of Diamond Head. The main building was designed by Chicago architect, David Adler and was modeled after an Italian villa in Florence, Italy of the same name. Barbara Cox Anthony chaired the school's board of trustees until her death in 2007.

== History ==
=== Heiau site ===
The site was near or partially on an ancient Hawaiian heiau (temple) called Papaʻenaʻena. Referred to by early writers as "Leahi" (the Hawaiian name for Diamond Head) heiau, it was quadrangular, about 80 ft (24 m) across with ocean facing terraces leading into the structure and several altars located near the back wall. Papaʻenaʻena was arguably built by Maui King Kahekili to commemorate his conquest of Oʻahu. This heiau was destroyed by Kanaia about 1856 and its stones were carted off to Waikiki for use as rock walls and driveways. Papaʻenaʻena figured Kamehameha I's conquest of the Hawaiian Islands. In 1804, when Kamehameha was on his way to invade Kauai he halted at Oʻahu with an army of 8000 men. An epidemic killed more than two-thirds of his army. During the epidemic Kamehameha, upon the advice of his priests, instituted a ten-day kapu (restriction) and sacrificed three humans and many hogs and edible plants. The men sacrificed were accused of eating tabu coconuts. Kamehameha also is reported to have sacrificed his nephew, Kanihonui, who broke the tabu with Kamehameha's Queen, Kaʻahumanu, at Papaʻenaʻena. " It overlooked what is today First Break, the beginning of Kalehuawehe, a surfing course famous for hundreds of years. Kahuna at Papa’ena’ena flew a kite at the heiau to inform surfers that the waves were up."

=== Founding ===
During the Mahele (when formal land titles were used for the first time) this site was given by the Kingdom of Hawaii to the future King Lunalilo. After the king's death this site was sold to James Campbell, in 1883. Walter F. Dillingham bought the land from Campbell and built a home for his bride, Louise Gaylord. Dillingham was the son of Benjamin Dillingham, of Oahu Railway and Land Company. The Dillinghams were married in Florence, Italy, at Villa La Pietra, the 600-year-old villa of Louise's aunt Hortense Mitchell Acton. After selecting the Diamond Head site as their home, Louise Dillingham and her husband hired Chicago architect David Adler to draw up plans for a villa that would draw its inspiration from Villa La Pietra in Florence, but not copy it. When completed in 1922 for $400,000 the main building included five bedrooms. These rooms, 47 years later, became the classrooms of the school. For 40 years La Pietra was the social center of Honolulu. The Dillinghams hosted many notable visitors, including President Franklin D. Roosevelt and Walt Disney.

The portion which is now the school was left by Dillingham to Punahou School. Unable to use the building, Punahou was anxious to sell it. After a period in which there were few interested buyers (Punahou was asking $1 million for the estate), Lorraine Day Cooke (wife of Richard Aexander Cooke Jr., who was grandson of Charles Montague Cooke and great-grandson of Amos Starr Cooke, co-founder of Castle & Cooke) and Mrs. Garner Anthony raised the funds. They had started a Hawaii School for Girls at Central Union Church. Plans were developed by architect John Tatom and his assistant Tom Fanning. Work to convert the estate into a school was done by parent volunteers and the Dillingham's Hawaiian Dredging Company. Hawaii School for Girls moved into the site at the start of the 1969-1970 school year. In 1976 a new six-classroom building was constructed on the site of the old swimming pool. This building, designed by Leo Wou, was intended to mirror the architecture of the Dillingham villa.

== Kapiʻolani Park ==
La Pietra is just a few hundred yards above Honolulu's Kapiʻolani Park. As swamp land in a desert, the land became a park specifically because it wasn't considered suitable for anything else. It is one of the few places on Oahu where rain rarely falls. Because La Pietra has limited space for athletics, Kapiʻolani Park is used for physical education classes and training for soccer and cross country running teams.

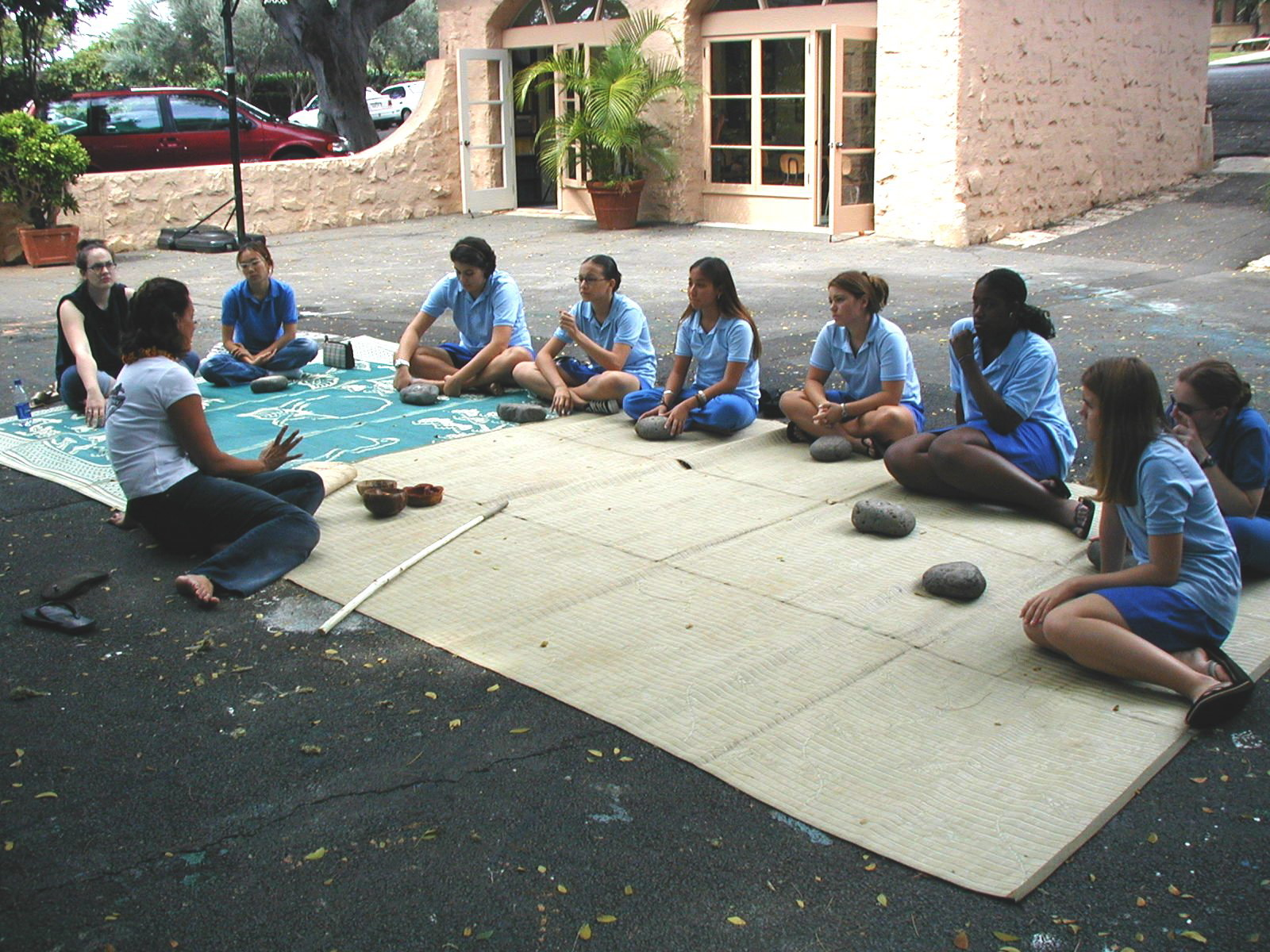
Hawaiian Studies at La Pietra

== School heads ==
Joseph Pynchon was founding headmaster at La Pietra from its inception in 1964 until his retirement at the end of the 1990-1991 school year. He joined La Pietra from ʻIolani School, where he was chairman of the English Department. Born in Boston, he served in Italy and India with the American Field Service in World War II. He earned a bachelor of arts degree from Carroll College and a master's of education degree from Harvard University. He was a freelance and features writer for Boston daily and weekly newspapers and magazines, as well as for education journals. La Pietra's first headmaster died January 2, 2008.

Nancy White, La Pietra's third Head of School, retired in June 2007 after twelve years. White began her teaching career at Kamehameha Schools in 1962. She also taught at Mid-Pacific Institute, a private school on O'ahu.

Nancy White was replaced by Mahina Eleneki Hugo, La Pietra's middle school dean. She was the fourth headmistress of the school. She earned a bachelor's degree in sociology and a master's in education in private school leadership from the University of Hawaii.

Mahina Hugo was replaced by Dr. Joshua Watson. Prior to joining La Pietra, Dr. Watson served as the Assistant Principal for Student Life at Mid-Pacific Institute in Honolulu. Dr. Watson serves as the current Head of School.

== Notable alumni ==
- Hoku, singer and actress
