= Anne Alexander Dickey =

Hawaiian clubwoman and civic leader

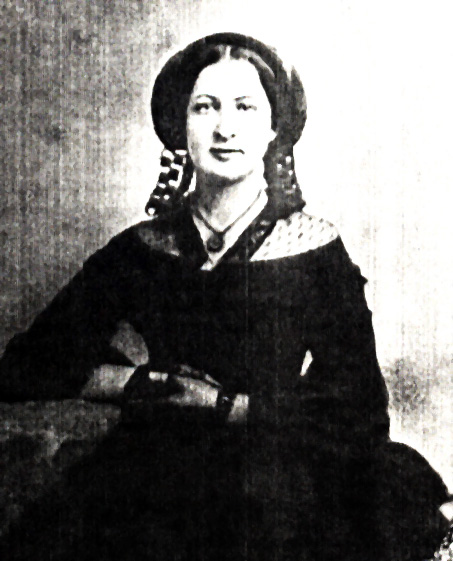
- Born: Anne Elizabeth Alexander; December 8, 1843; Lahaina, Kingdom of Hawaii
- Died: July 28, 1940 (aged 96); Oakland, California, U.S.
- Resting place: Makawao Cemetery
- Occupation: clubwoman
- Known for: Co-founding the Daughters of Hawaii
- Spouse: Charles Henry Dickey
- Children: 5 (including Charles W. Dickey)
- Parent(s): William Patterson Alexander (father); Mary Ann McKinney (mother)
- Relatives: Samuel Thomas Alexander (brother); William DeWitt Alexander (brother)

Anne Elizabeth Alexander Dickey (December 8, 1843 – July 28, 1940) was a Hawaiian civic leader and clubwoman who co-founded the Daughters of Hawaii.

== Early life and family ==
Dickey was born Anne Elizabeth Alexander on December 8, 1843, in Lahaina, Hawaii to Rev. William Patterson Alexander and Mary Ann McKinney Alexander. Her parents were American Protestant missionaries who came to the Kingdom of Hawaii with the American Board of Commissioners for Foreign Missions. She was the sister of the businessman Samuel Thomas Alexander and the author William DeWitt Alexander.

== Adult life ==
Like her parents, Dickey was involved in Christian organizations and took particular interest in the Christian Woman's Board of Missions and the Central Union Church.

In 1903, she co-founded the Daughters of Hawaii along with Emma Smith Dillingham, Anna M. Paris, Sarah Coan Waters, Lucinda Clark Severance, Ellen Armstrong Weaver, and Cornelia Hall Jones. She was also a member of the Daughters of the American Revolution, the Hawaiian Humane Society, and The Outdoor Circle.

She was married to Charles Henry Dickey, the son of T. Lyle Dickey. Her husband was an American Civil War veteran who later served as a Hawaiian senator.

Dickey died on July 28, 1940, in Oakland, California, where she had been living for twenty years. She was buried at Makawao Union Church's cemetery on Maui.
