= Daughters of Hawaii =

American women's service organization

Daughters of Hawaiʻi

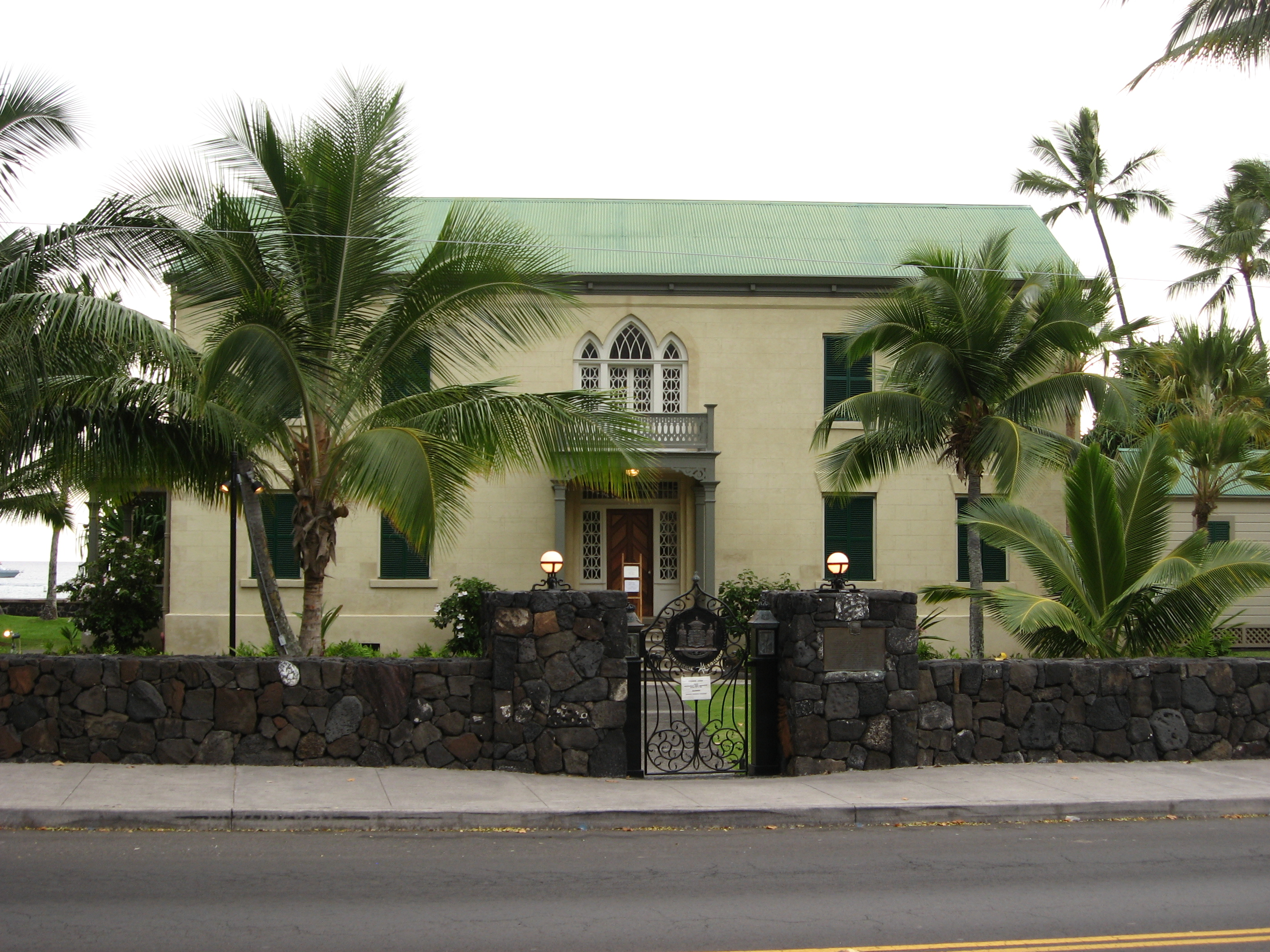
- Huliheʻe Palace, which is managed by the organization
- Founded: November 18, 1903
- Founders: Emma Smith Dillingham; Anna M. Paris; Anne Alexander Dickey; Sarah Coan Waters; Lucinda Clark Severance; Ellen Armstrong Weaver; Cornelia Hall Jones
- Type: Non-profit, lineage society, service organization
- Purpose: Historic preservation, Cultural preservation, education, community service
- Headquarters: 2913 Pali Highway; Honolulu, Hawaii, U.S.
- Members: 1,100
- Regent & President: Manu Powers
- Website: daughtersofhawaii.org

The Daughters of Hawaiʻi is a nonprofit service organization and lineage society founded in 1903 that is dedicated to the preservation of Hawaiian culture, language, and sacred and historic sites. They run the Huliheʻe Palace and the Queen Emma Summer Palace (Hānaiakamalama).

== History ==
The organization was established in 1903 by seven women who were daughters of American Protestant missionaries: Emma Smith Dillingham, Anna M. Paris, Anne Alexander Dickey, Sarah Coan Waters, Lucinda Clark Severance, Ellen Armstrong Weaver, and Cornelia Hall Jones. Born in Hawaiʻi, they were citizens of the Kingdom of Hawaiʻi before annexation. Foreseeing the inevitable loss of much of the Hawaiian culture, they founded the organization "to perpetuate the memory and spirit of old Hawaiʻi and of historic facts, and to preserve the nomenclature and correct pronunciation of the Hawaiian language."

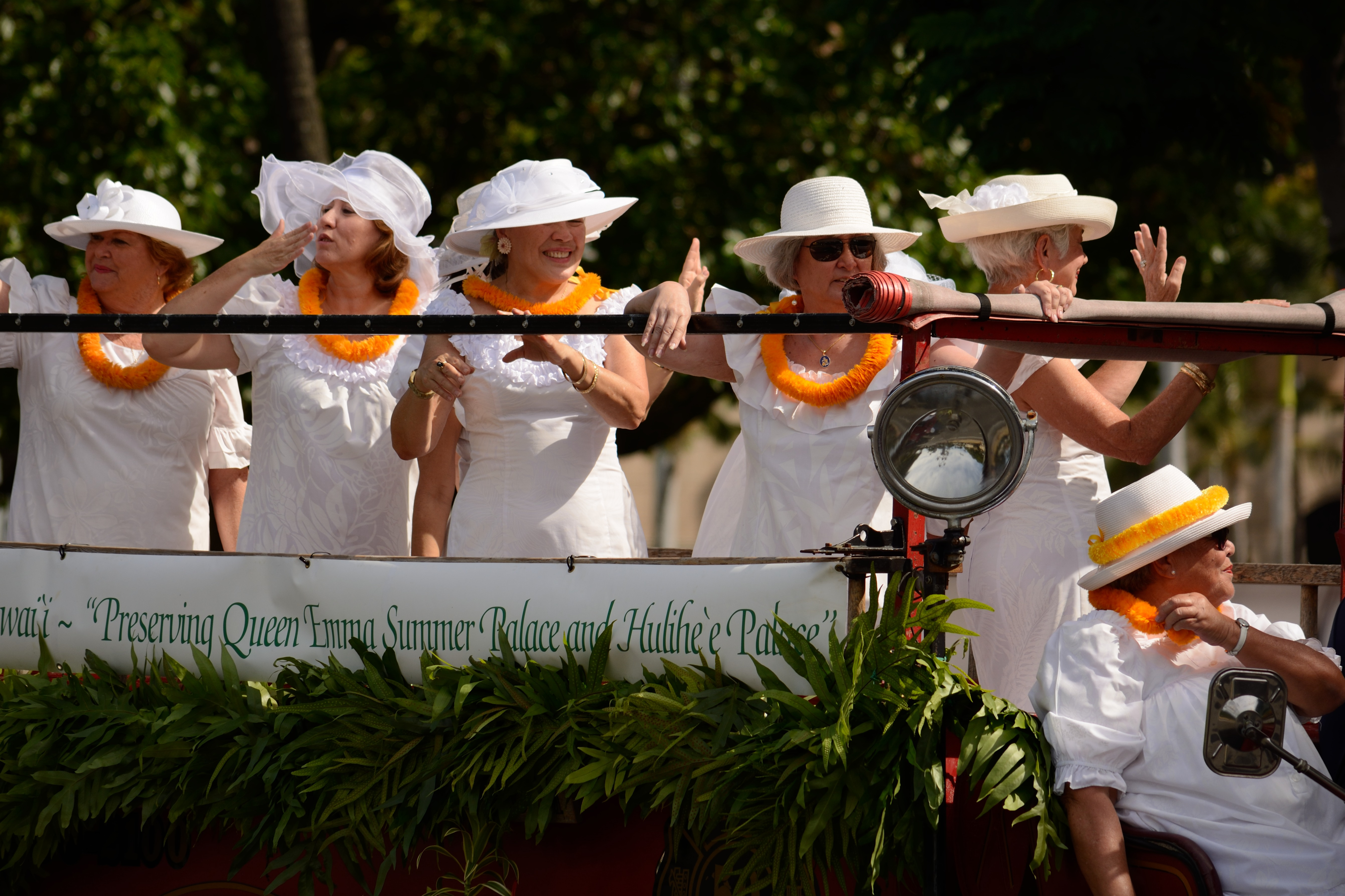
The Daughters of Hawaii at the 2013 King Kamehameha Parade

Hānaiakamalama, now known as the Queen Emma Summer Palace was the "mountain" home of Queen Emma Na'ea, wife of Kamehameha IV. She had inherited it from her uncle, John Young II, son of the famous advisor to Kamehameha I, John Young I. Queen Emma used the home as a retreat where she could escape from the oppressive heat of Honolulu into the coolness of Nuʻuanu. The Queen Emma Summer Palace was acquired by the Daughters of Hawaiʻi in 1913, narrowly avoiding the demolition of the house and construction of a baseball field on the grounds. The Territorial Government granted the Daughters the use of the home and 22,750 square feet (2,114 m^{2}) of the grounds as long as the home was used and maintained as a museum.

Having acquired and restored Hānaiakamalama, the Daughters set about to save Hulihe‘e Palace in 1924. The Palace was in ruins. The grounds were so overgrown that the house could not be seen from the road. In 1925, the Territorial Legislature purchased Hulihe‘e and set it aside for the Daughters to use and maintain as a museum. When the Daughters finally took over Huliheʻe in 1927, there was little interest in historic preservation in the islands. At this time, the Inter-Island Steam Navigation Company began to formulate plans for an oceanfront hotel in Kailua-Kona. They decided that the Huliheʻe grounds was the most desirable location in Kailua-Kona and at once began to pressure the Daughters to relinquish Huliheʻe. The ladies held firm and because of their spirit, the State of Hawaiʻi has an important educational museum and Kailua-Kona still has some open waterfront. Huliheʻe Palace was placed on the National Register of Historic Places in 1973.

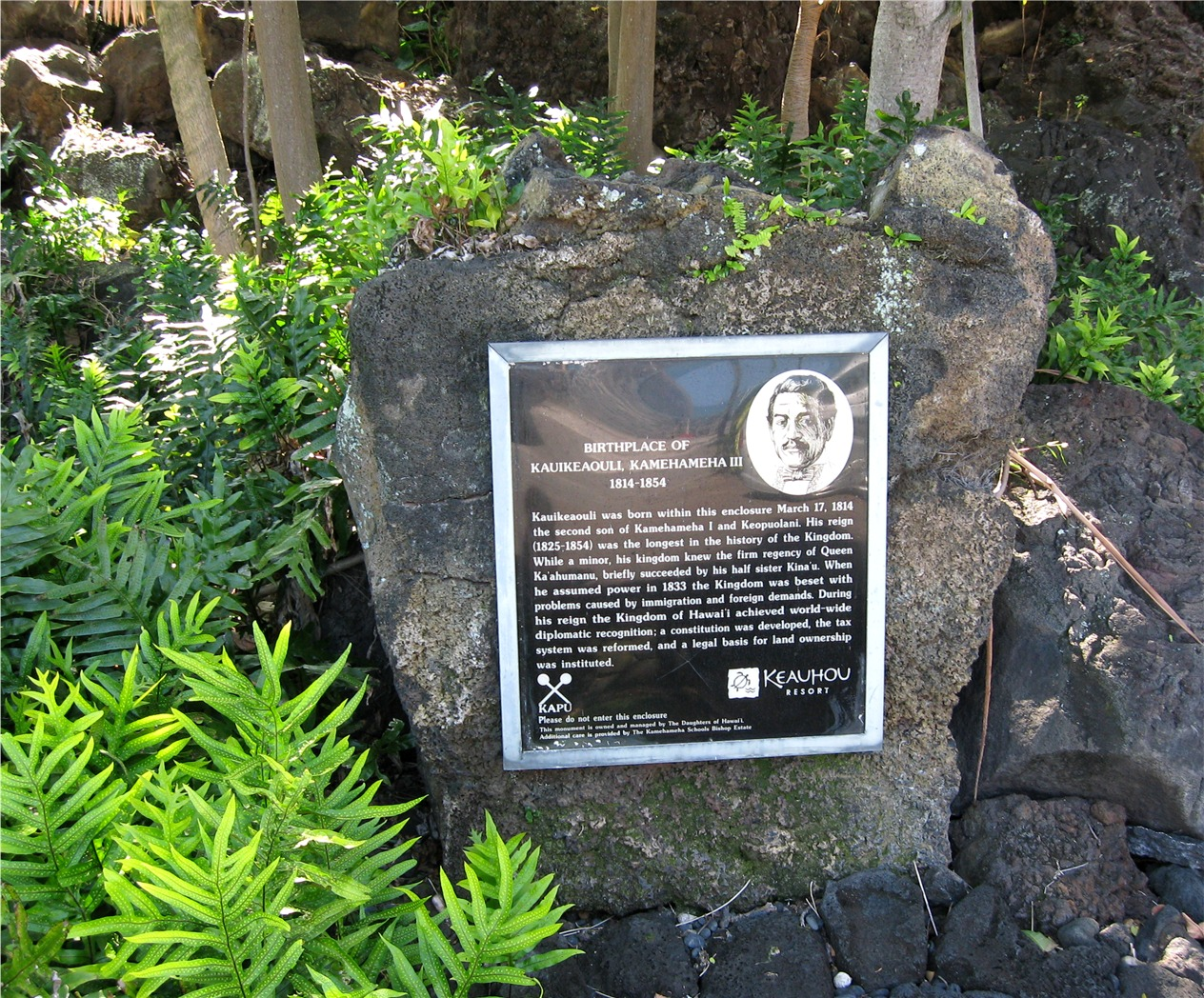
Birthplace of Kamehameha III

The Daughters of Hawaiʻi also own and maintain the site of Kamehameha III's birth at Keauhou Bay, Kona. It was also added to the Register of Historic Places in 1978.

== Funding ==
As a 501(c)3 nonprofit organization, the Daughters of Hawaiʻi are supported by donations, dues, admission fees and fundraising events.

== Notable members ==
- Anne Alexander Dickey (1843–1940), civic leader and clubwoman
- Emma Smith Dillingham (1844–1920), educator, poet, and civic leader
- Mary Dillingham Frear (1870–1951), First Lady of the Territory of Hawaii
- Cornelia Hall Jones (1842–1911), philanthropist and clubwoman
- Lydia Liliʻuokalani Kawānanakoa (1905–1969), member of the Hawaiian royal family
- Lucinda Clark Severance (1843–1921), clubwoman
- Sarah Coan Waters (1843–1916), clubwoman
- Ellen Armstrong Weaver (1844–1924), clubwoman
- Lahilahi Webb (1862–1949), lady-in-waiting to Queen Liliʻuokalani
