= Lucinda Clark Severance =

Hawaiian clubwoman

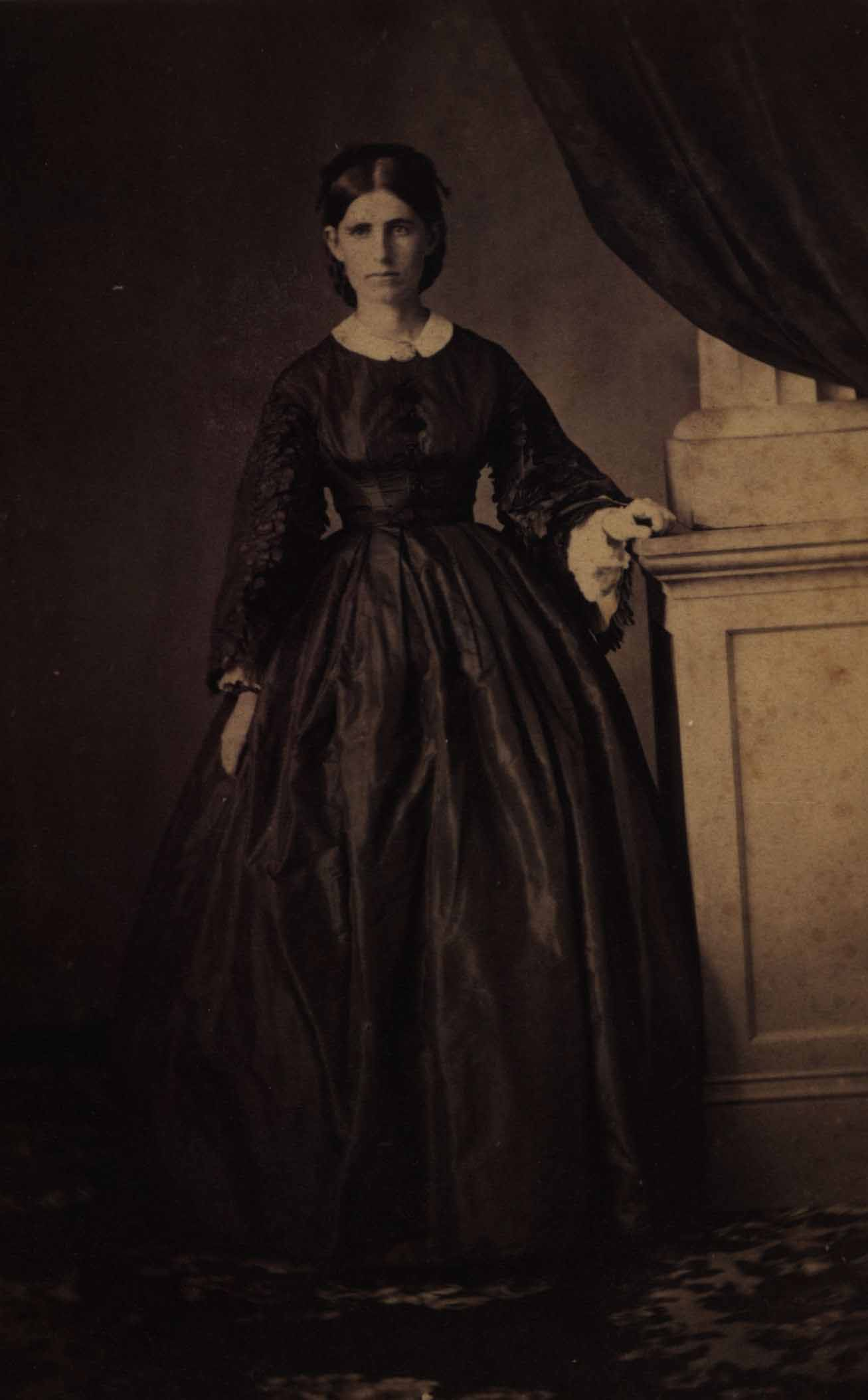
- Born: Lucinda Maria Clark; September 22, 1843; Wailuku, Kingdom of Hawaii
- Died: July 10, 1921 (aged 77); Hilo, Territory of Hawaii, U.S.
- Occupation: clubwoman
- Known for: Co-founding the Daughters of Hawaii
- Spouse: Luther Severance
- Children: 2
- Parent(s): Ephraim Weston Clark (father); Mary Kittredge
- Relatives: Luther Severance (father-in-law)

Lucinda Maria Clark Severance (September 22, 1843 – July 10, 1921) was a Hawaiian clubwoman and one of the founders of the Daughters of Hawaii.

== Early life ==
Severance was born on September 22, 1843 in Wailuku, Hawaii. She was the daughter of the minister Ephraim Weston Clark, who was from a New England family.

== Civic activities ==
She was raised in Christian missionary surroundings and maintained her religious practices throughout her life as an active participant in church and Sunday school affairs.

In 1903, Serverance cofounded the Daughters of Hawaii along with Emma Smith Dillingham, Anna M. Paris, Anne Alexander Dickey, Sarah Coan Waters, Ellen Armstrong Weaver, and Cornelia Hall Jones.

== Personal life ==
She married Luther Severance, son of politician Luther Severance. They had two children, Helen and Allen.
