= Ephraim Weston Clark =

Missionary who helped translate the Bible into Hawaiian

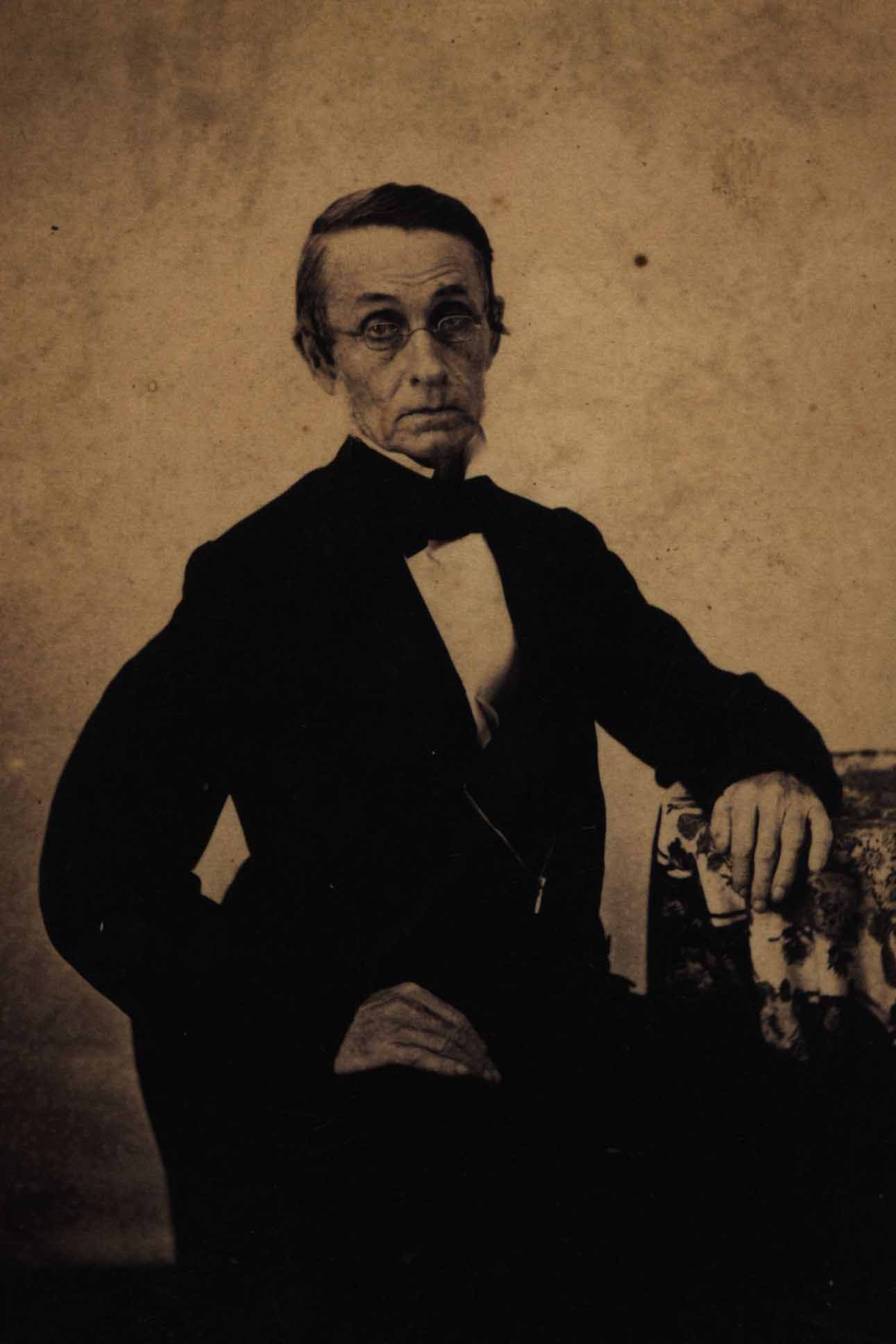
- Born: July 25, 1799; Haverhill, New Hampshire
- Died: July 15, 1878 (aged 78); Chicago, Illinois
- Resting place: Rosehill Cemetery and Mausoleum
- Education: Dartmouth College; Phillips Academy
- Known for: Kahu (pastor) of Kawaiahaʻo Church revision of the Hawaiian Bible
- Spouses: Mary Kittredge; Sarah Helen Richards
- Children: 8 (including Lucinda Clark Severance)

Ephraim Weston Clark (July 25, 1799 – July 15, 1878) was an American pastor and translator most remembered for his decades of work helping to translate the Bible into the Hawaiian language, and his subsequent work on the 1868 revision of the translation. He was the third Kahu (pastor) of Kawaiahaʻo Church in Honolulu, and served in that position 15 years. His early years as a missionary were spent on the Hawaiian island of Maui; while serving as Kahu of Kawaiahaʻo, he also spent several months with the Hawaiian Missionary Society in Micronesia.

== Family background ==
He was born in Haverhill, New Hampshire, to Edward Clark and Elizabeth Weston, but the family soon relocated to Peacham, Vermont, where he grew up. Decades after his death, The Friend periodical put together his biography based on unpublished writings he had begun during the last year of his life. In his notes, Clark had described his father as a soldier with the Marquis de Lafayette during the Siege of Yorktown, and his mother's father Ephraim Weston as a soldier in the "French War of 1775" (possibly referring to the Siege of Fort St. Jean).

== Preparing for the ministry ==
While a teenager working in Stanstead, Canada, he attended a local Congregational Church and was inspired to train for the ministry. He completed his studies at Peacham Academy in Vermont, and graduated from Dartmouth College in 1824. Clark did post-graduate studies in theology at Phillips Academy in Andover, Massachusetts. He was ordained into the ministry on October 3, 1827, by the Rev. Jonathan Smith Green, with whom he would work throughout much of his life.

== Hawaii ==
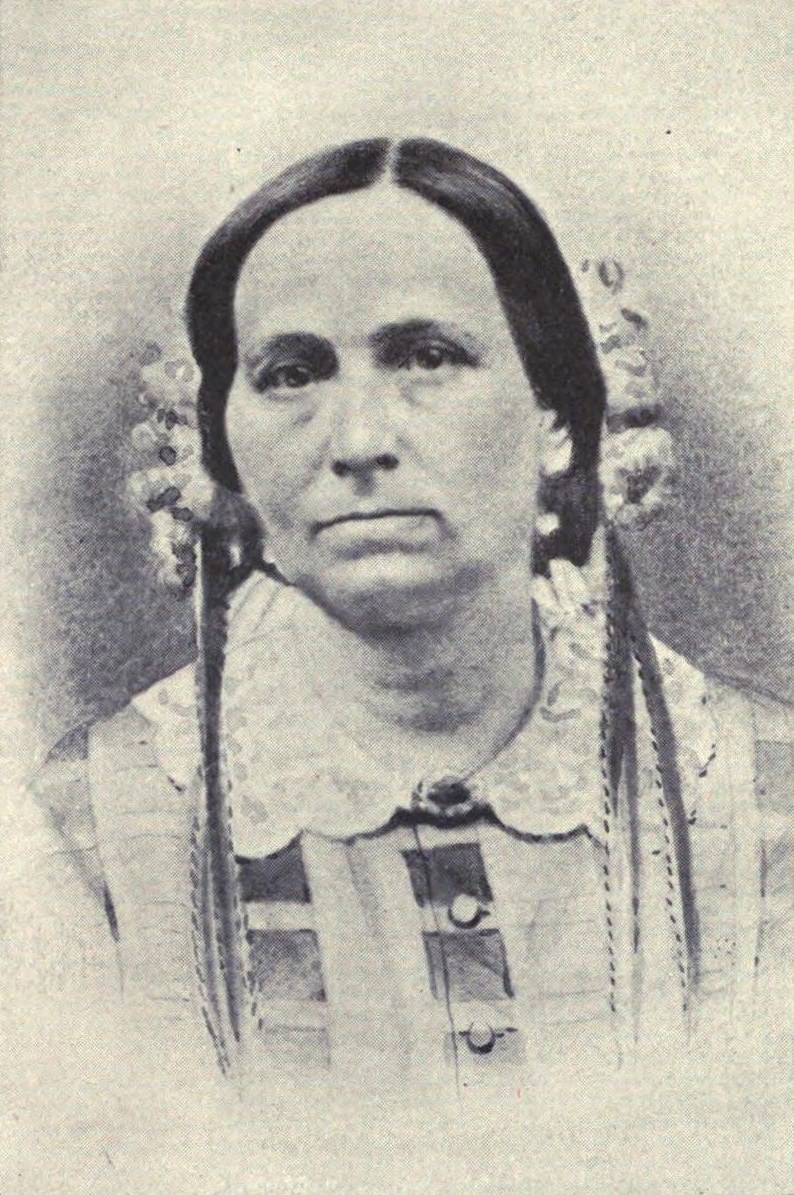
Mary Kittredge Clark

Ephraim Clark and his wife Mary Kittredge were part of the Third Company of missionaries sent to the Kingdom of Hawaii by the American Board of Commissioners for Foreign Missions. Rev. Jonathan Green and his wife Asenath Cargill Spring were also part of the same company of missionaries. The sea voyage aboard the Parthian began November 3, 1828, and took 148 days, during which the missionary passengers lived in cramped roach-infested quarters, with inadequate eating utensils. Most of the missionary couples had only been married a matter of weeks before embarking on the voyage. Ephraim and Mary had been married a few days short of 6 weeks when they boarded the Parthian. The other two missionary couples in this company were Lorrin Andrews and his wife Mary Ann Wilson, and Peter Johnson Gulick and his wife Fanny Hinckley Thomas. In addition to the missionaries and their wives, four unmarried women were included as household assistants for the wives once they arrived in Hawaii. The ship docked in Honolulu on March 30, 1829.

The Clarks were initially assigned to Honolulu, ministering to non-Hawaiians, primarily sailors and non-resident visitors to the islands. Clark was sent to assist Lorrin Andrews at Lahainaluna mission station in 1834. According to his biographical notes in The Friend, he took a five-month health sabbatical from his work in 1839. During this period, he recuperated with friends in the missionary fields of China. He received a call in 1843 to be pastor to a Hawaiian congregation in Wailuku on Maui.

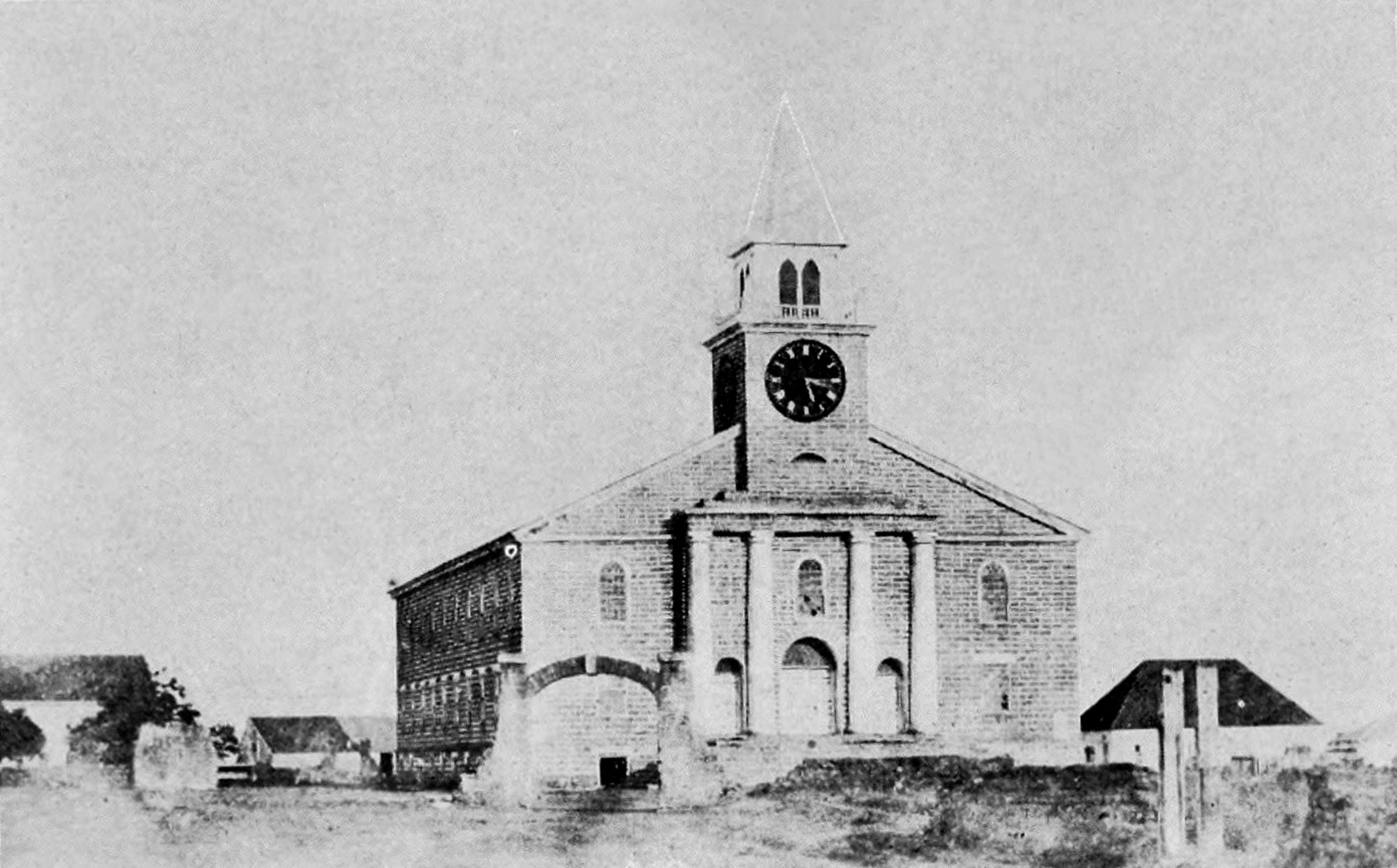
First known photograph of Kawaiahaʻo, taken in 1857 by Hugo Stangenwald during Clark's tenure as kahu

Clark was called to be Kahu (pastor) of Kawaiahaʻo Church in 1848, to succeed Richard Armstrong who had been appointed Minister of Public Instruction. The current Kawaiahaʻo Church was constructed between 1836 and 1842. When Clark started, the structure was known as "the First Native Church at Kawaihao in Honolulu". The church as a body of believers had existed since Hiram Bingham arrived in 1820, and began meetings adjacent to his thatched hut. Other replacement structures were built in the same location before the stone church was erected, and had been a church home for royalty since Queen Kaʻahumanu accepted Christianity in 1824. Other names for the church have included "the Stone Church", "First Native Hawaiian church" and "the Mission Church".

As Secretary of the Hawaiian Missionary Society, that position required an absence from the Kawaiahaʻo pulpit for several months in 1852, assisting the Society's efforts at establishing mission stations in Micronesia. It was in 1853, during Rev. Clark's tenure that "the First Native Church at Kawaihao in Honolulu" became "Kawaiahaʻo Church". His wife Mary died while he was Kahu of the church.

Queen Victoria had already consented to be the godmother of four-year-old Crown Prince of the Kingdom of Hawaii Albert Kamehameha, in a ceremony conducted by an Episcopalian bishop. Before the bishop could arrive for that to take place, the prince fell ill in August 1862, and his health progressively declined. Even though Clark was a Congregational minister, the child's parents Kamehameha IV and Queen Emma arranged for him to perform the Episcopalian ceremony. The service was held on August 23, with the newly arrived British commissioner William Webb Follett Synge and his wife as stand-ins for Queen Victoria. The young prince died four days later.

== Hawaiian language translations ==
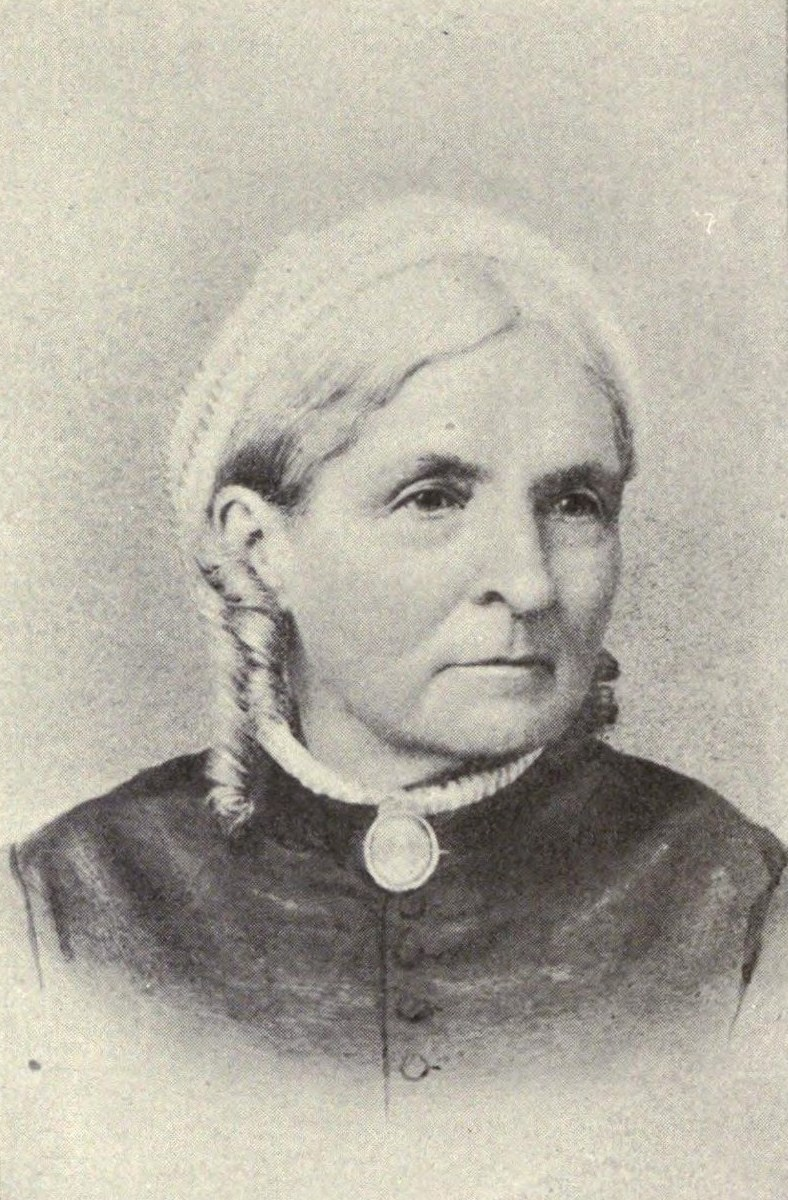
Sarah Helen Richards Clark

When he resigned as Kahu of Kawaiahaʻo Church in 1868, Clark was president of the committee to revise the Hawaiian language translation of the Bible. His second wife Sarah Helen Richards became his assistant in the revision. He had been involved with the original translation project for decades, and had made trips to the mainland United States in 1856, 1859 and 1864 to meet with printers.

The translation of the Old Testament from the original Hebrew and Aramaic, and the New Testament from ancient Greek, had been an ongoing project begun in 1824 by Hiram Bingham, William Richards, Artemas Bishop, and Asa Thurston. Over the years, the project came to include the Royal Governor of Hawaii Kuakini and Hawaiian scholars Samuel Kamakau, John Papa ʻĪʻī and David Malo. Missionaries Jonathan Smith Green, Lorrin Andrews, Sheldon Dibble and Clark came on board in 1830. The translation of the New Testament was published in 1832, with Queen Kaʻahumanu receiving the first copy. Translation of the Old Testament was published in 1839, as was a translated text of the Bible.

Other translations Clark was involved with include "First Lessons in Astronomy", text-books on geometry, trigonometry, and surveying, and the children's book The Little Philosopher.

== Personal life and final years ==
On September 27, 1827, Clark wed Mary Kittredge of Mont Vernon, New Hampshire. They were the parents of eight children, including Lucinda Clark Severance. After she died on August 14, 1857, he married Sarah Helen Richards of Norwich, Vermont, on September 13, 1859. According to information provided by him, his second wife was the widow of Rev. Thomas Hall, and was quite accomplished in her own right with a 10-year tenure as Kimball Union Academy principal. In later years, they moved to Chicago to be near their children. Ephraim died July 16, 1878, and Sarah died August 12, 1887.

== Bibliography ==
- Damon, Ethel M. (1945). The Stone Church at Kawaiahao, 1820–1944. Trustees of Kawaiahao Church. OCLC 610133650 – via HathiTrust.
- Hawaiian Mission Children's Society (1901). American Protestant Missionaries to Hawaii. Hawaiian Mission Children's Society. OCLC 865972403 – via HathiTrust.
- Kirk, Robert W. (2012). Paradise Past: The Transformation of the South Pacific, 1520–1920. McFarland. ISBN 978-0-7864-9298-5.
- Kurian, George Thomas; Lamport, Mark A. (2016). Encyclopedia of Christianity in the United States. Rowman & Littlefield. ISBN 978-1-4422-4432-0.
- Woods, Leonard (1833). Memoirs of American missionaries, formerly connected with the Society of Inquiry Respecting Missions, in the Andover Theological Seminary: embracing a history of the Society, etc., with an introductory essay. Peirce and Parker. OCLC 36623712 – via HathiTrust.
