= Abigail Willis Tenney Smith =

Christian missionary to Hawaii

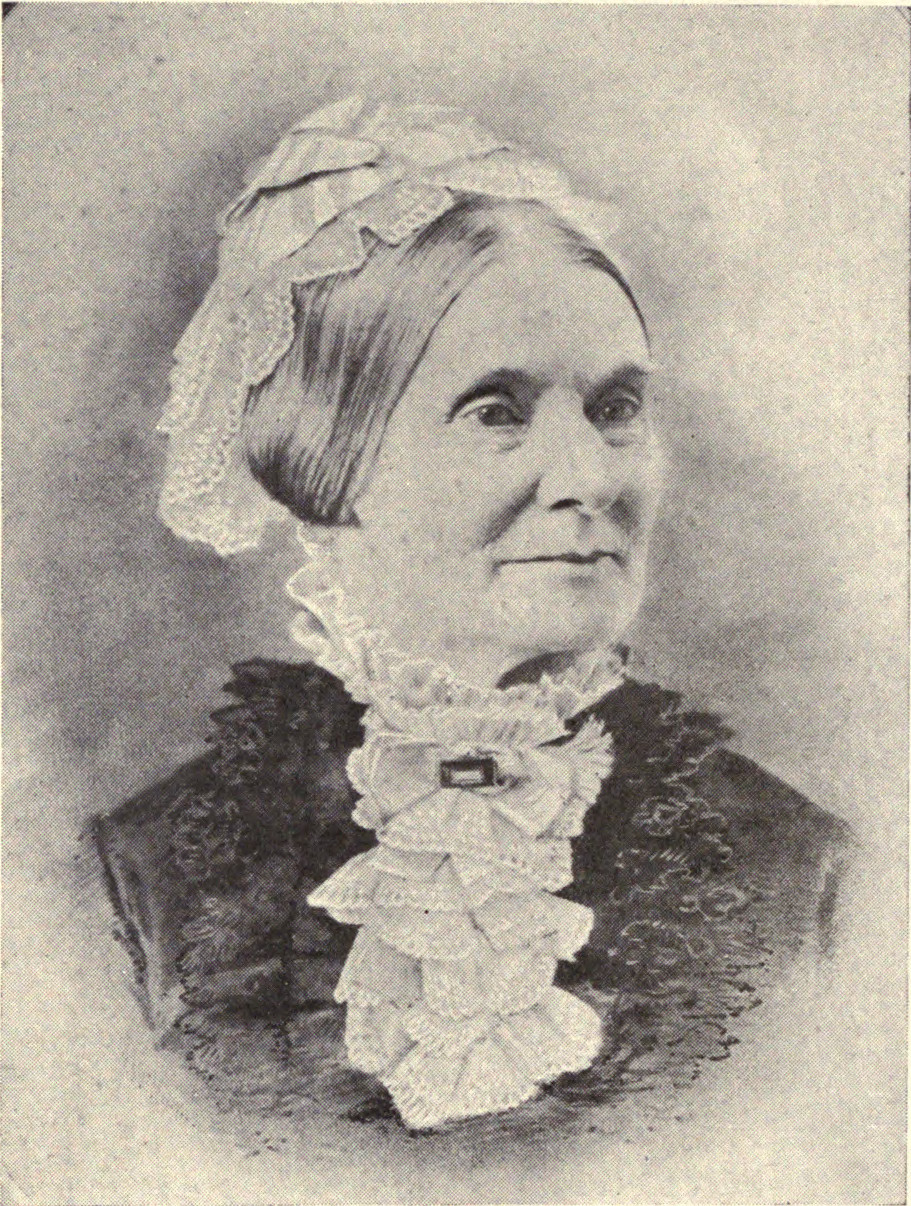
- Smith in 1880

President, Woman's Board of Missions for the Pacific Islands

Personal details
- Born: Abigail Willis Tenney; December 4, 1809 Barre, Massachusetts, U.S
- Died: January 31, 1885 (aged 75) Honolulu, Hawaiian Kingdom
- Spouse: Rev. Lowell Smith (m. 1832)
- Children: 7, including Emma Smith Dillingham
- Relatives: Walter F. Dillingham (grandson); Mary Dillingham Frear (granddaughter); Benjamin Franklin Dillingham (son-in-law)
- Education: Ipswich Female Seminary
- Occupation: missionary; teacher
- Committees: Strangers' Friend Society; Ladies Benevolent Society
- Nickname: Abba

Abigail Willis Tenney Smith (née Tenney; 1809–1885) was a Protestant missionary and teacher sent by the American Board of Commissioners for Foreign Missions (ABCFM) to the Hawaiian Kingdom in 1833. There, she served as President of the Woman's Board of Missions for the Pacific Islands.

== Early life and education ==
Abigail (nickname "Abba") Willis Tenney was born in Barre, Massachusetts, on December 4, 1809. Her father was a school teacher. Abigail was the ninth of eleven children, six of was whom were boys.

Owing to financial problems, the family moved to Brandon, Vermont when Abigail was still a young girl. She spent most of her early years there.

Smith's father influenced her career choice to become a teacher.

At about the age of eighteen, while teaching at the village school in Heath, Massachusetts, she met Lowell Smith, then an undergraduate in Williams College. He was fitting himself for his future missionary work, having been converted to Christianity when about twenty-one. They became engaged soon after. To better fit herself for the future work she would be doing with her husband, Abigail entered the newly organized Ipswich Female Seminary, in Ipswich, Massachusetts. Her rapid progress led her to achieving the position of pupil-teacher.

== Career ==
She married Rev. Lowell Smith on October 2, 1832. The couple had five children.

The couple were part of the sixth ABCFM company. On November 23, 1832, they sailed from New London, Connecticut, on board the whaling bark Mentor, Captain John Rice in company with Rev. John Deill, first seaman's chaplain and first pastor of the Bethel, and Mrs. Deill; Rev. and Mrs. Benjamin Wyman Parker, parents of Rev. Henry Hodges Parker; and Charles Burnham, a carpenter and builder, who came to erect the Bethel Church, the framework of which was on board the vessel. The voyage last 159 days, during which they saw no land. Inclement weather pushed them far south of Cape Horn, passing near many icebergs before arriving in Honolulu, Hawaii on May 1, 1833.

The women of the party were met at the shore by the Hawaiian queen's carriage — a hand cart, drawn by two local men. The Smith's first station was Kalua'aha at Molokai (June 1833), then well populated. Their only non-local colleagues on the island were Rev. and Mrs. Harvey Rexford Hitchcock . Their first house was a small native hut. But after a few months, Rev. Smith, assisted by his parishioners, all locals, built a stone cottage with a thatched roof.

On Molokai Mrs. Smith's health broke down, and it was many years before it improved. Her condition while on Molokai became so alarming that, when they had lived there about a year, she was brought to Honolulu, her husband's station being changed to Ewa in November 1834, where they remained about two years. But the Ewa climate proved insufficient to improve Mrs. Smith to health and they returned again to Honolulu in July 1836 in order that she might have continuous medical treatment.

At Honolulu, Rev. Smith served as the superintendent of Kawaiahao schools, then, for 30 years, was the pastor of the Second Church, (Kaumakapili). Mrs. Smith, still an invalid, and obliged to lie on a sofa all day, held daily audience with many local women, whom she instructed in common housekeeping, dressmaking, and religious duty towards their families. She taught the local Hawaiians to weave mats, hats, and bags. The mats and hats were sold to wealthier natives and to whalers; the bags were purchased by the two or three sugar cultivators then at work on the islands.

In November 1852, Augustus L., their youngest son, was born. From that year, Mrs. Smith's health improved steadily. Of the seven children born to Rev. and Mrs. Smith after their arrival in the islands, only two survived.

The smallpox epidemic of 1853 was devastating. When the epidemic began, all the family were vaccinated. The natives, however, were stricken. For three months, the fire did not go out in Mrs. Smith's kitchen. Soup, rice, and tea were made in large quantities daily and given to the natives who came to the house in great numbers.

Later in the same year, two Hawaiian young men, employed as cooks in town, wanted to learn English and Mrs. Smith agreed to teach them. The two pupils told others and her class grew in a few months until it became a well-established and well-known evening school for Hawaiian young men. To limit and define the membership, Smith fixed tuition rates at US$.25 per week; thirty pupils kept up their studies with her for a full year. The effort of teaching five nights a week almost continuously was too severe for Smith's delicate health, and she reluctantly abandoned her evening school, immediately beginning a day school for Hawaiian children - to which, from time to time, there came also English, Chinese, and South Sea Islanders. In 1856, this school was made a government school — the first English-teaching common school on the islands. During the years 1854-60, many of the most promising native boys on the islands attended Mrs. Smith's school; its membership at one time numbering 80 pupils.

In 1860, it was decided to open a government school for Hawaiians in the Royal School premises, and Mrs. Smith was invited to become principal. She declined to accept the position, and, the exigencies of the situation seemed to demand it, the government school she had so successfully conducted was transferred to the Royal School. But Smith's educational work did not cease there. She opened a school for Caucasian children and taught it at home for three years, coming down the valley in 1863 to the cottage later occupied by Joseph Dwight Strong. In that school (as occasionally during many years before), Mrs. Smith was assisted by her daughter, Emma Smith Dillingham.

In 1865, Rev. and Mrs. Smith paid their first visit home after an absence of nearly 32 years. They were accompanied by their son and daughter and were absent from the islands 15 months. On their return, Mrs. Smith reopened their school at her own home, continuing it until the end of 1879.

Her religious fellowship was with Kaumakapili Church, of which she became a member in 1838, and in which she retained her membership ever after. For many years, she worked in its Sunday school, together with her two children.

She was one of the organizers of the Woman's Board of Missions for the Pacific Islands in 1871, and served as president until her death. Of the Strangers' Friend Society, organized in 1852, Smith was secretary from the beginning, remaining in the position for 32 years, until her death. She was also a member of the Ladies Benevolent Society.

In 1878, Smith spent three months on the Pacific Coast, her second and last return visit to the U.S. For the previous four years, her life had been comparatively quiet.

== Later life ==
Smith did her last work in the Woman's Board of Missions for Pacific Isles on January 13, 1885. Two days later, she tried to attend the meeting of the recently formed Woman's Christian Temperance Union (WCTU) but had to be taken home before it closed. A few days later, she was driven around the grounds of Lunalilo Home, a gospel meeting being in progress at the time. Soon after, she was carried to her daughter's home to rest. There, not unconscious, but unable to speak, she lay until she died on January 31, 1885, in Honolulu. The funeral took place on February 1, in the Kaumakapili church with services in both Hawaiian and English languages.

== Selected works ==
- Recollections of Charles H. McDonald. To the children of the Sandwich Island's Mission (Lahainaluna, 1843)

== See also ==
- List of missionaries to Hawaii
