= Waters (name) =

Waters is a surname, derived from "Wat", or "Wa'ter", an old pronunciation of Gaultier or Walter, and similarly derived from the surname Watson ("Wat's son"). The name is common from an early date in Wales and Yorkshire, as well as Shropshire, England. P. H. Reaney, co author of the book A Dictionary of English Surnames, said “water was the normal medieval pronunciation of Walter. Theobald Walter is also called Theobaldus filius Walteri, Theobaldus Walteri and Tebaut Water in the Feet of Fines for Lancashire 1212-1236.”

== Statistics ==
In the United States of America, Waters is the 429th most common surname, with an estimated 64,662 people. In New Zealand, Waters is the 350th most common surname, with an estimated 1,816 people. However, Waters is the 252nd most popular surname in Australia with an estimated 13,768 people, while the United Kingdom ranks Waters as the 381st most popular surname, with 16,725 people.

== People surnamed Waters ==
=== Military people ===
- Anna May Waters (1903–1987), Canadian military nurse
- Daniel Waters (Minutemen) (1731–1816), officer in the United States Navy
- John K. Waters (1906–1989), former U.S. general, prisoner of war, and son-in-law of George S. Patton
- Terence Edward Waters (1929–1951), British soldier awarded the George Cross

=== Performers ===
- Crystal Waters (born 1961), American singer and songwriter
- David Waters (actor) (born 1975), Australian actor
- Derek Waters (born 1979), American actor, comedian, screenwriter, producer and director
- Dina Waters (born 1965), American actress
- Doris Ethel Waters, better known as half of the comedy duo Gert and Daisy
- Ethel Waters (1896–1977), American singer and actress
- Florence Elsie Waters, better known as half of the comedy duo Gert and Daisy
- Horace John Waters, the birth name of actor Jack Warner
- Jeff Waters (born 1966), Canadian guitarist
- John Waters (actor) (born 1948), Australian actor
- Latanza Waters, American house music singer
- McKinley Morganfield better known as Muddy Waters (1913–1983), American blues singer-songwriter and musician
- Rhys Waters (born 1984), Welsh Canadian comedian, producer and director
- Roger Waters (born 1943), English rock bassist, vocalist and lyricist, co-founder of Pink Floyd
- Russell Waters (1908–1982), Scottish film actor

=== Politicians ===
- Anne Marie Waters (born 1977), founder of the far-right For Britain party
- Charles A. Waters (1892–1972), American politician and judge
- Chea Waters Evans, American politician from Vermont
- Dan Waters, politician in Ontario, Canada
- Larissa Waters (born 1977), Australian politician
- Maxine Waters (born 1938), Democratic member of the U.S. House of Representatives
- Somerset R. Waters (1829–1919), American politician from Maryland
- Stanley Waters (1920–1991), Canadian Senator

=== Sportspeople ===
- Anthony Waters (born 1985), American football linebacker
- Anthony Waters (field hockey) (1928–1987), American field hockey player
- Beau Waters (born 1986), Australian rules footballer
- Ben Waters (1904–1962), New Zealand rower
- Brian Waters (born 1977), American football guard
- Carole Waters, retired Australian basketball player
- Darren Waters (born 1985), Welsh rugby union footballer
- Dominic Waters (born 1986), American basketball player in the Israel Basketball Premier League
- Drew Waters (born 1998), American professional baseball player
- Fraser Waters (born 1976), South African footballer
- Guy Waters (born 1964), Australian boxer
- Harry Waters (born 1976), British piano and Hammond organ player
- Huw Waters (born 1986), Welsh cricketer
- Jake Waters (born 1992), American football player and coach
- Jordan Waters (born 2000), American football player
- Joseph Waters (rugby union) (1882–1954), Scottish rugby union player
- Katarina Waters (born 1980), English wrestler
- Tremont Waters (born 1998), American basketball player

=== Others ===
- Aaron C. Waters (1905–1991), American geologist
- Allan Waters (1921–2005), Canadian businessman
- Anna Christian Waters, American child missing since 1973
- Anthony S. Waters, American fantasy artist
- Billie Waters (1896–1979), English artist
- Craig Waters (born 1956), public information officer of the Florida Supreme Court
- Daniel Waters (screenwriter) (born 1962), American screenwriter and film director, brother of Mark S. Waters
- David Roland Waters (1947–2003), the killer of the American activist Madalyn Murray O'Hair
- James Waters, Chairman of CHUM Limited
- John Waters (disambiguation)
  - John Waters (columnist) (born 1955), Irish columnist
  - John S. Waters (1893–1965), American filmmaker who directed films from 1916 until 1958
  - John Samuel Waters Jr. (born 1946), American filmmaker
- Joseph Waters(born 1952), American classical composer
- Keith Waters (born 1962), pioneer in facial animation
- Lesley Waters (born 1961), English celebrity chef
- Lou Waters (born 1938), American television journalist
- Margaret Waters (1835–1870), English murderer
- Mark Waters (born 1964), American film director
- Mathew Waters (sound engineer), American sound engineer
- Miriam Van Waters (1887–1974), American feminist social worker
- Ralph M. Waters (1883–1979), American anesthesiologist
- Richard Waters (1935–2013), American artist, inventor of Waterphone
- Sarah Coan Waters (1843–1916), Hawaiian clubwoman
- Sarah Waters (born 1966), Welsh novelist
- T. A. Waters (1938–1998), American writer

== People with the given name Waters ==
- Waters W. Braman (1840–1893), New York politician

== Fictional characters ==
- Angela, her twin brother and murderer/serial killer Archie and their mother Rose Waters in Pretty Little Liars (2022 TV series)

== See also ==
- Watters (surname)
- Walters (surname)
