= Louise Olga Gaylord Dillingham =

American civic leader (1885–1964)

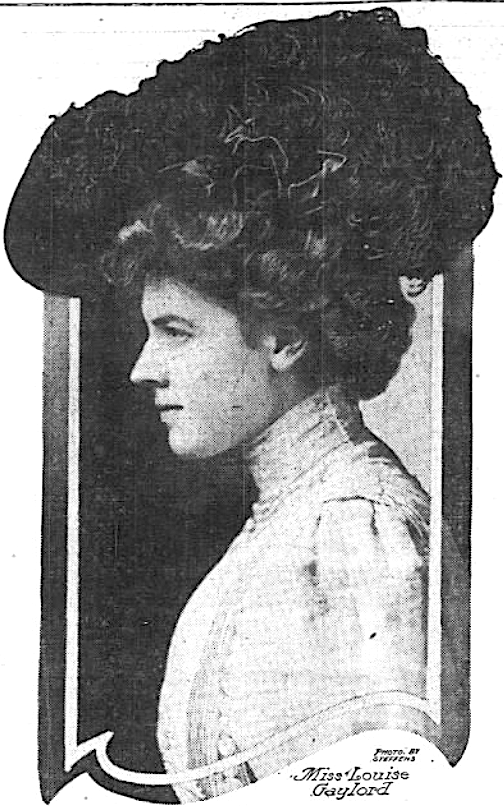
- Louise Olga Gaylord in c. 1910
- Born: Louise Olga Gaylord; November 3, 1885; Chicago, Illinois, U.S.
- Died: January 28, 1964 (aged 78); Mallorca, Spain
- Burial place: O'ahu Cemetery, Honolulu, Hawaii, U.S.
- Occupations: Civic leader, socialite, philanthropist
- Spouse: Walter Francis Dillingham (m. 1910–1963; his death)
- Children: 4
- Relatives: Benjamin Franklin Dillingham (father in-law); Emma Smith Dillingham (mother-in-law)

Louise Olga Gaylord Dillingham (November 3, 1885 – January 28, 1964) American socialite, community civic leader, and philanthropist in the Territory of Hawaii. She was the daughter of Chicago banker Henry George Gaylord, and was married to Honolulu industrialist Walter F. Dillingham.

== Life and career ==
Louise Olga Gaylord was born November 3, 1885, in Chicago. Her parents were Elizabeth “Bessie” (née Mitchell), and Henry George Gaylord. She was three years old when her father died, which left her with an inheritance. She attended Miss Spence's School in New York City.

She married Walter Francis Dillingham in Florence, Italy in 1910, and together they had four children. The family lived at La Pietra, an Italian villa–styled house near Diamond Head.

Dillingham supported agricultural efforts at Allandale Farm in Hawaii, and led community campaigns to plant “war gardens” during World War I. She did charity work with the Palama Settlement in Honolulu. She was one of the early founders of the League of Women Voters of Hawaii.

Their son Henry Gaylord Dillingham (1918–1945), was in the U.S. military during World War II and died in active duty in Kawasaki, Japan. In 1948, the Dillingham Airfield near Mokulēʻia, Hawaii was named in their son's honor.

Her husband died on October 22, 1963. Dillingham died shortly after on January 28, 1964, in Mallorca while on vacation.

== See also ==
- List of people from Honolulu
