= Cornelia Hall Jones =

Hawaiian philanthropist

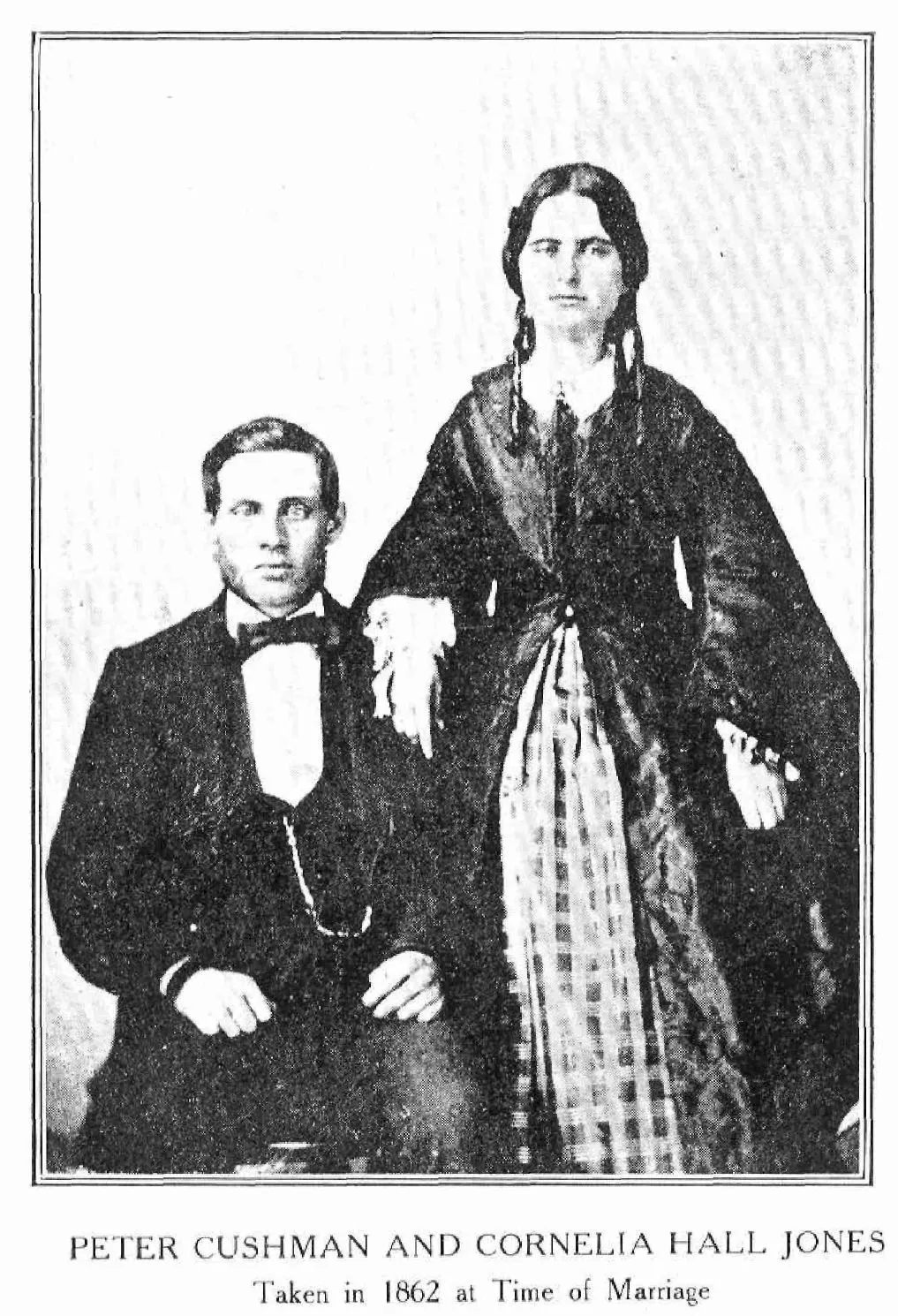
- Jones (right) with her husband (left) in 1862
- Born: Cornelia Hall; 1842; Honolulu, Kingdom of Hawaii
- Died: 1911 (aged 68–69); Honolulu, Territory of Hawaii, U.S.
- Resting place: Oʻahu Cemetery
- Education: Punahou School
- Occupations: philanthropist clubwoman
- Known for: Co-founding the Daughters of Hawaii
- Spouse: Peter Cushman Jones
- Parent: Edwin Oscar Hall (father)

Cornelia Hall Jones (1842–1911) was a Hawaiian philanthropist and clubwoman. She was one of the founders of the Daughters of Hawaii.

== Early life and education ==
Jones was born Cornelia Hall in Honolulu in 1842 to American parents who emigrated to the Kingdom of Hawaii. She was the daughter of Sarah Lyons Williams and Edwin Oscar Hall, a government official who served as Minister of Finance under King Kamehameha III and as Ministry of the Interior under King Lunalilo.

She attended Punahou School from 1856 to 1861.

== Adult life ==
On May 12, 1862, she married the businessman Peter Cushman Jones who, a few months after their wedding, was appointed as the Minister of Finance by Queen Liliʻuokalani. Her husband also served as president of C. Brewer & Co. and the Bank of Hawaii.

She was a noted philanthropist of her day, establishing the Portuguese Mission and the Palama Settlement's Palama Chapel with her husband. Together, they also established scholarships for Hawaiian students.

In 1903, Jones co-founded the Daughters of Hawaii along with Emma Smith Dillingham, Anna M. Paris, Anne Alexander Dickey, Sarah Coan Waters, Lucinda Clark Severance, and Ellen Armstrong Weaver. They founded the organization to preserve and promote Hawaiian culture, language, and history. She was also a member of the Daughters of the American Revolution.
