= Watter =

Watter may refer to:

- Watter (band), an American experimental music ensemble
- Watter (Twiste), a river in Hesse, Germany
- Oskar von Watter (1861–1939), German general in WWI
- Tim Watter (born 1991), Swiss Olympic snowboarder

== See also ==
- Watters (disambiguation)
