= Titus Coan =

American minister (1801–1882)

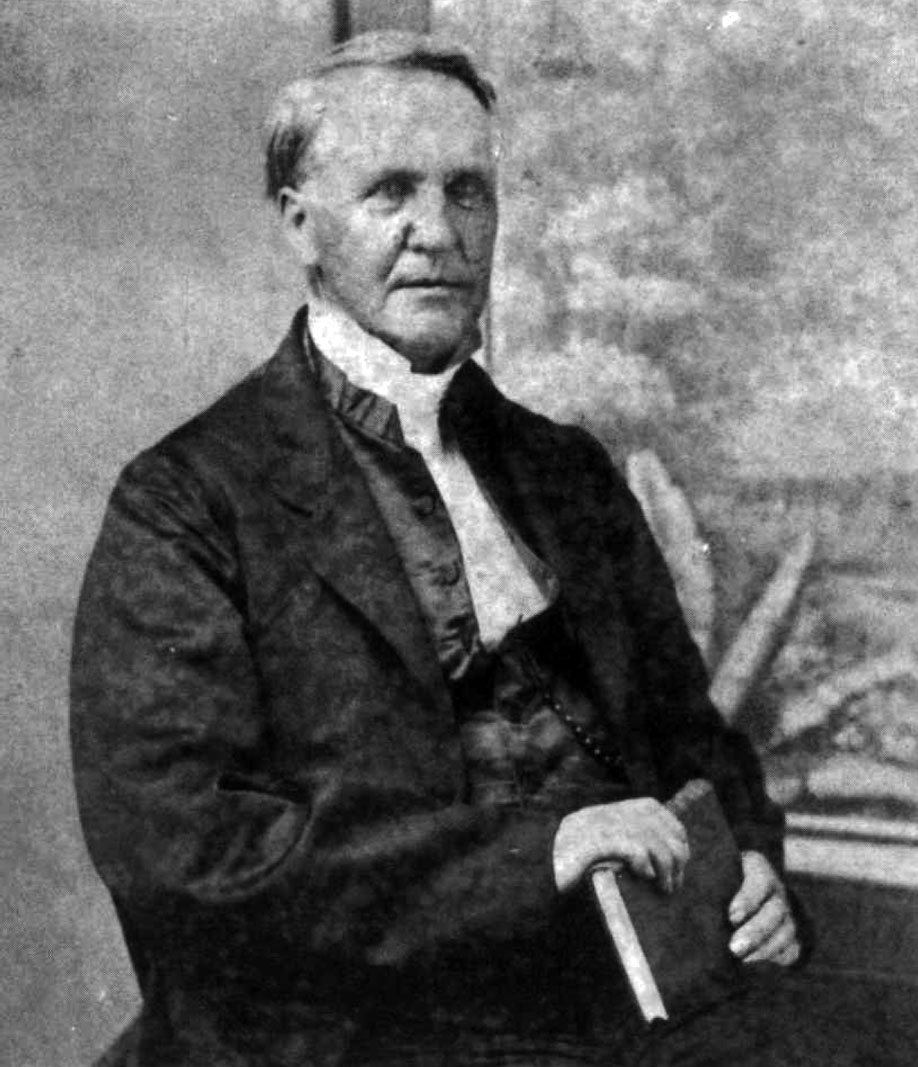
- Born: February 1, 1801; Killingworth, Connecticut
- Died: December 1, 1882 (aged 81); Hilo, Hawaii
- Occupation: Missionary
- Spouses: Fidelia Church; Lydia Bingham
- Children: Titus Munson, Harriet Fidelia, Sarah Eliza, Samuel Latimer

Titus Coan (February 1, 1801 – December 1, 1882) was an American minister from New England who spent most of his life as a Christian missionary to the Hawaiian Islands.

== Early life and family ==
Titus Coan was born on February 1, 1801, in Killingworth, Connecticut, the son of Gaylord Coan and Tamza Nettleton. In June 1831, he entered the Auburn Theological Seminary in Auburn, New York, and was ordained in April 1833. In August of that year he sailed on a mission to Patagonia for the American Board of Commissioners for Foreign Missions.

In 1834 Coan returned to the United States, where he married Fidelia Church. In December 1834 they left on the merchant ship Hellespont, part of the seventh company from the American Board to the Hawaiian Islands, then known as the "Sandwich Islands", arriving on June 6, 1835.

Their son Titus Munson Coan, born in 1836, became a physician who served in the American Civil War and died in 1921. Daughter Harriet Fidelia was born in 1839 and died in 1906. Daughter Sarah Eliza was born in 1843 and died in 1916. Son Samuel Latimer Coan was born 1846 and died in 1887. The mother Fidelia died in September 1872.

Coan married second to Lydia Bingham, the daughter of the Rev. Hiram Bingham I (an earlier missionary), on October 13, 1873. He completed his autobiography in 1881, the year before he died. His book was digitized in 1997 by his great-great-grandson Edward J. Coan.

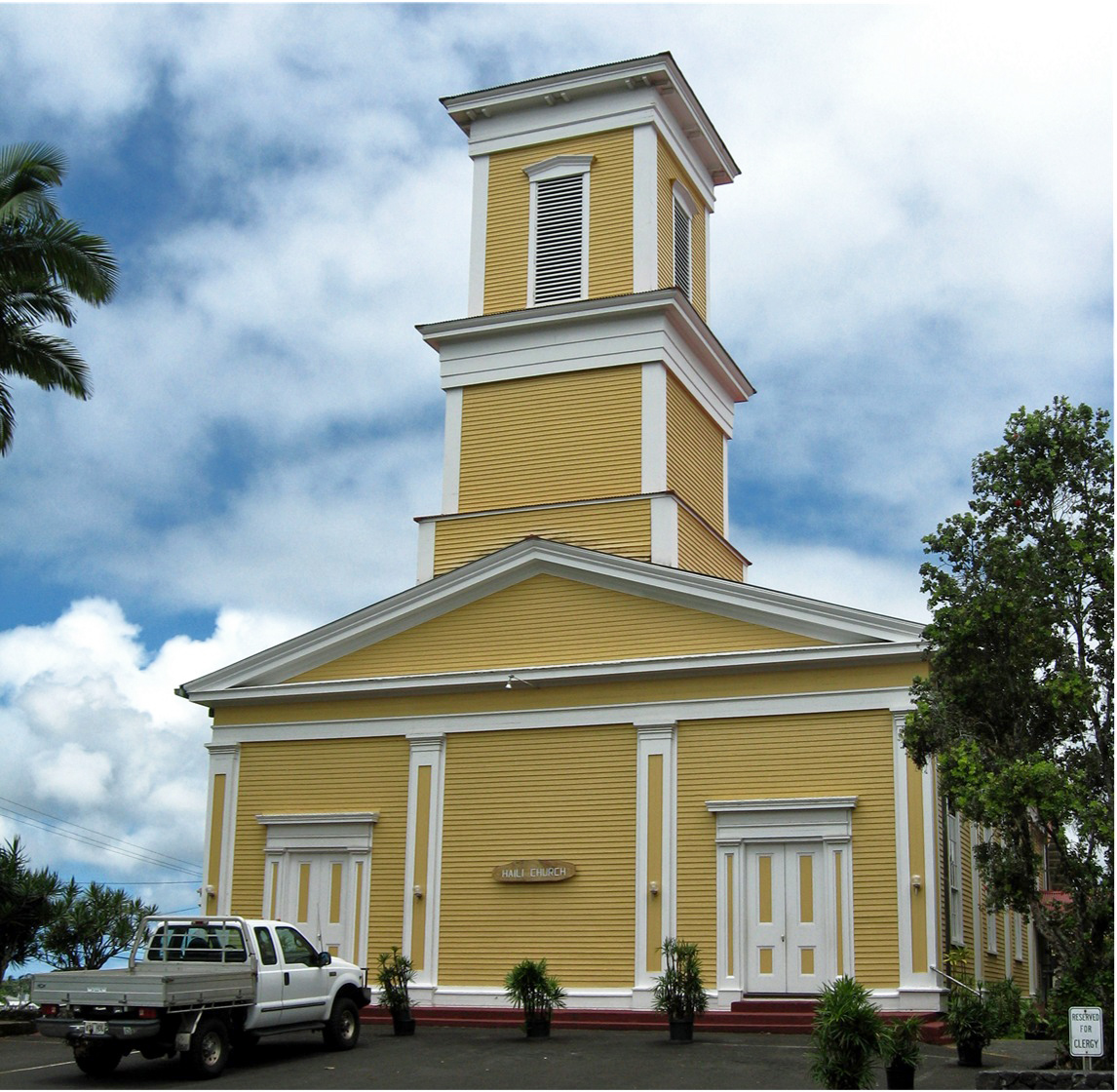
Haili Church today

== Work ==
The Coans arrived in Honolulu, Hawaii, in June 1835. They sailed to Hilo, Hawaii, in July, where they stayed most of the rest of their lives. He learned the Hawaiian Language and helped educate the residents of the area and recruit them into Christianity. When the United States Exploring Expedition visited Hilo in 1840–1841, Coan met the geologist James Dwight Dana. Over the next four decades they corresponded, and Coan regularly sent Dana observations of eruptions of volcanoes on Hawaii. These contributed to Dana's development of the Hawaii hotspot theory for the geologic evolution of the island chain.

His book includes descriptions of the heavy tropical rains, eruptions of the Kīlauea volcano, earthquakes, and tsunamis, such as the one caused by the 1868 Hawaii earthquake. Coan was known as "the bishop of Kilauea," and his observations were invaluable to subsequent scientists. Both Fidelia and his second wife Lydia wrote a piece about the volcano, as well as his sons, Titus M. and Samuel. Fidelia Coan was among the first American women to publish in a scientific journal: an 1852 article in the American Journal of Science.

Titus Coan directed the construction of Haili Church from 1855 to 1859. He visited the Marquesas Islands in 1860 and 1867. From 1870 to 1871, he and Fidelia returned to the United States, where they gave an extensive speaking tour.
