= Watters (surname) =

Watters is a surname. Notable people with the surname include:

- Andrée Watters (born 1983), Canadian singer
- Charles J. Watters (1927–1967), chaplain in the United States Army
- Clarence Watters (1902−1986), American organist
- David E. Watters (1944–2009), American linguist who specialized in Tibeto-Burman languages
- David H. Watters (born 1950), American politician
- Frank Watters (1934–2020), Australian artist and gallerist, owner of Watters Gallery in Sydney
- George Watters (1904–1980), British soldier
- George Watters II (born 1949), American sound editor (now retired)
- Harper Watters, American ballet dancer
- Harry Watters (fl. 1990s–2000s), American jazz trombonist
- Henry Watters (1853–1924), mayor of Ottawa, Ontario, Canada, in 1924
- Jesse Watters (born 1978), American interviewer and television host
- Loras Joseph Watters (1915–2009), American Roman Catholic bishop
- Lu Watters (1911–1989), American trumpeter and bandleader of the Yerba Buena Jazz Band
- Ricky Watters (born 1969), former NFL American football running back
- Sam Watters (born 1970), American songwriter and record producer, previously of the group Color Me Badd
- Thomas Watters (1840–1901), British Oriental scholar and translator
- Warren Prall Watters (1890–1992), founding archbishop of the Free Church of Antioch in Nebraska

== See also ==
- Waters (surname)
