= Walter F. Dillingham =

American industrialist and businessman

Walter Francis Dillingham
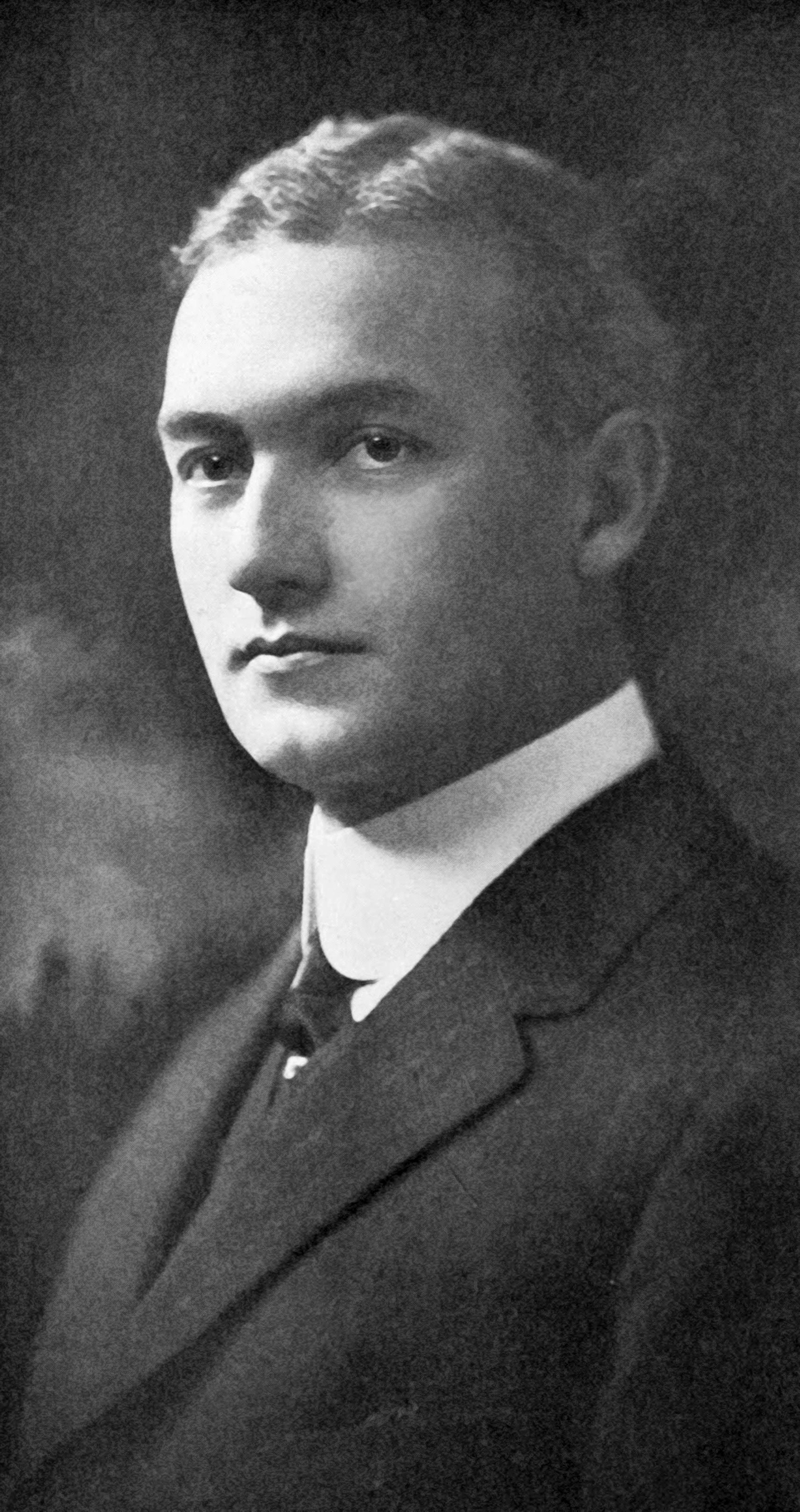
- Walter Dillingham in 1917
- Born: April 5, 1875; Honolulu, Kingdom of Hawaii (now Hawaii, United States)
- Died: October 22, 1963 (aged 88)
- Burial place: Valley of the Temples Memorial Park
- Occupations: Businessman, property developer
- Spouse: Louise Olga Gaylord (m. 1910–1963; his death)
- Children: 4
- Parent(s): Benjamin Dillingham; Emma Louise Smith

Walter Francis Dillingham (April 5, 1875 – October 22, 1963) called the "Baron of Hawaii Industry", was an American industrialist and businessman from Honolulu, Hawaii. He gained favors from Hawaii politicians to develop urban Honolulu and Waikiki.

== Early life and family ==
Dillingham was born in Honolulu, in the Kingdom of Hawaii. His father was Benjamin Dillingham who founded the Oahu Railway and Land Company. His mother was Emma Louise Smith, daughter of missionaries Lowell and Abigail Smith.

In 1889 he moved to the United States to attend school in Auburndale, Massachusetts, and then Harvard University 1898–1900.

== Career ==
He first worked as a clerk for his father, and then managed the Dowsett Company and founded Hawaiian Dredging Company. In 1904 his father was hospitalized and he managed the OR&L. From 1907–1913, the Governor of the Territory of Hawaii was Walter F. Frear who was married to Dillingham's sister Mary Emma.

In 1909 he constructed a dry dock at Pearl Harbor which eventually became part of the US Navy base. He also enlarged the ports of Kahului and Hilo.

On May 2, 1910 he married Louise Olga Gaylord in Florence, Italy. After his father died in 1918, he and his brother Harold Garfield Dillingham inherited the family businesses. During World War I he worked for the US Army Motor Transport Corps in Washington, DC.

Dillingham served on several commissions for the Territory of Hawaii, including the tax appeal court 1908–1910.

In 1919, Dillingham built a large house at Papaʻenaʻena, an ancient Hawaiian altar to the surf and place of human sacrifice to the god Kūkaʻilimoku, on the slopes of Diamond Head. The home, called La Pietra, is now a private academy for girls. It was named after the estate of his wife's relatives where they were married, Villa La Pietra.

Dillingham drained the wetlands of Waikīkī in the early 1920s and created the Ala Wai Canal, on whose banks the Hawaiʻi Convention Center was built. He helped suppress Japanese Hawaiian plantation workers' calls for better labor conditions during the Oahu Sugar Strike of 1920, as chair of the Hawaii Emergency Labor Commission. The Hawaiian Sugar Planters' Association-sponsored commission petitioned the U.S. Senate to lift an 1882 ban on importing workers from China, hoping to use Chinese migrant laborers to replace the Japanese and break the strike. Dillingham is also seen as controversial for comments which by today's standards would be considered racist after the Massie Trial of 1933, which resulted in the killing of a native Hawaiian and the beating of a Japanese Hawaiian by a mob of angry (and never-prosecuted) whites.

In 1948, Dillingham Airfield, a small Air Force base near Mokulēʻia, Hawaii was named for his son Captain Henry Gaylord Dillingham, a B-29 pilot who was killed in action over Kawasaki, Japan on July 25, 1945.

His son Benjamin Franklin Dillingham II (1916–1998) ran with the Hawaii Republican Party against Daniel Inouye for the Senate in 1962 and lieutenant governor in 1974 but lost both elections.

== Death and legacy ==
The other Senator from Hawaii, Hiram Fong, gave the eulogy at his funeral, after his death October 22, 1963. Fong said he lived a life that spanned the full spectrum of Hawaiian history". Dillingham is buried at the Valley of the Temples Memorial Park in Kāneʻohe.

In 1961, his son Lowell Smith Dillingham (1911–1987) merged the remains of the Oahu Railway and Land Company and the Hawaiian Dredging and Construction Company to form the Dillingham Corporation. It was sold to private investors in 1983 for $347 million.

A daughter Elizabeth Dillingham (1921–2011) married investment banker Myron Arms Wick Jr. (1915—1990) in 1940.
