= Sarah Coan Waters =

Hawaiian clubwoman

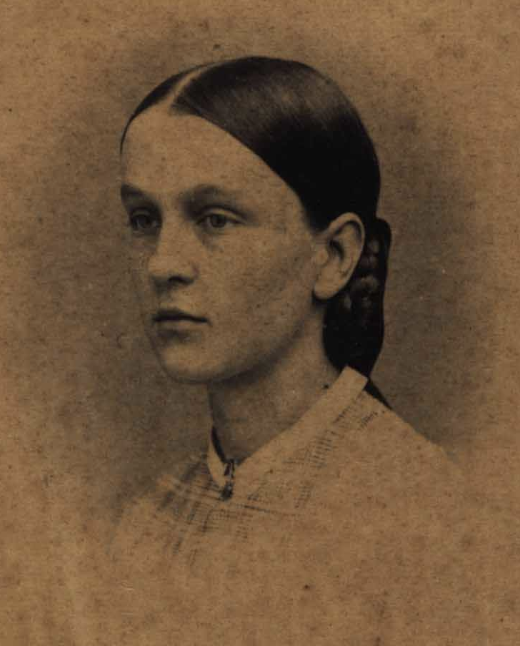
- Born: Sarah Eliza Coan; January 26, 1843; Hilo, Kingdom of Hawaii
- Died: March 29, 1916 (aged 73); Kingston, New York, U.S.
- Resting place: Wiltwyck Rural Cemetery
- Occupation: clubwoman
- Known for: Co-founding the Daughters of Hawaii
- Spouse: Edward Emerson Waters
- Father: Titus Coan

Sarah Eliza Coan Waters (January 26, 1843 – March 29, 1916) was a Hawaiian clubwoman and one of the founders of the Daughters of Hawaii.

== Early life and family ==
Waters was born Sarah Eliza Coan on January 26, 1843, in Hilo, Hawaii. She was the daughter of Fidelia Church and Titus Coan, an American Christian pastor and missionary at Waiākea Mission Station-Hilo Station. Her brother, Titus Munson Coan was a surgeon in the Union Army during the American Civil War.

== Civic activities ==
Waters was a member of the Hawaiian Mission Children's Society. In 1903, she co-founded the Daughters of Hawaii along with Emma Smith Dillingham, Anna M. Paris, Anne Alexander Dickey, Cornelia Hall Jones, Lucinda Clark Severance, and Ellen Armstrong Weaver. She later moved to New York, where she was prominent in local society.
