= Benjamin Franklin Dillingham =

American businessman and industrialist

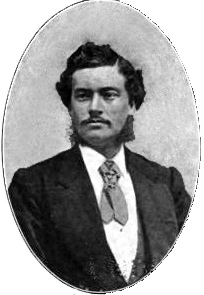
- Born: September 4, 1844; Brewster, Massachusetts, United States
- Died: April 7, 1918 (aged 73); Oahu, Territory of Hawaii (now Hawaii)
- Burial place: Oahu Cemetery
- Occupation: Businessman
- Spouse: Emma Louise Smith
- Children: Walter F. Dillingham; Mary Dillingham Frear
- Parent(s): Benjamin C. Dillingham; Lydia Sears Howe
- Relatives: Louise Olga Gaylord (daughter in-law)

Benjamin Franklin Dillingham (September 4, 1844 – April 7, 1918) was an American businessman and industrialist during the late Kingdom of Hawaii era, throughout the period of the Republic of Hawaii, and during the first two decades of the Territory of Hawaii.

== Early life ==
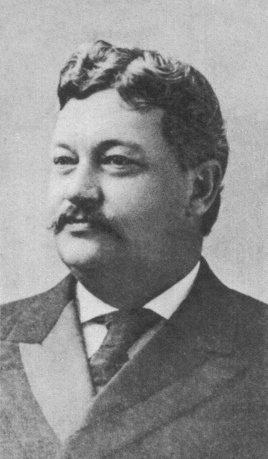

Dillingham was born on September 4, 1844, into an old New England family in Brewster, on Cape Cod in Massachusetts. His father was Benjamin C. Dillingham and mother was Lydia Sears Howes.

At the age of fourteen he became a sailor on the Yankee clipper Southern Cross which was captured and destroyed by the Confederate State Army steamer Florida in 1863, during the American Civil War. In 1865 he became first mate of a barque named Whistler that did a regular run between San Francisco and Honolulu. On his third trip to the island kingdom, Dillingham broke his leg after falling from a horse and was forced to convalesce in Hawaii.

== Later life and career ==
He decided to stay in Honolulu and by the end of 1865 was a clerk at Diamond Hardware, which he bought out for $28,000 in 1869. On April 26, 1869, he married Emma Louise Smith (1844–1920), of a prominent missionary family. She was the daughter of Reverend Lowell Smith and Abigail Willis Tenney. Dillingham turned out to be an astute businessman, and more importantly, was always willing to take risks. In 1879 he started a dairy farm in upper Honolulu, and during the 1880s became increasingly successful. He founded the Oahu Railway and Land Company (OR&L) that began service in November 1889. Dillingham was well-liked among Honolulu's various communities, and he included King Kalākaua and Queen Liliʻuokalani as his friends. Although he disapproved of the overthrow of the Kingdom of Hawaii in 1893, he looked favorably on the American annexation in 1898, which he believed would bring long-term stability to the islands. Dillingham spent the rest of his life in Hawaii.

Apart from the OR&L, Dillingham was especially active in sugarcane plantations, including the Olaʻa Sugar Company on the Big Island, and the Ewa and Kahuku sugarcane plantations on Oahu. While the OR&L and these sugar companies were profitable, Dillingham's Big Island railroad, the Hawaii Consolidated Railway (Hilo Railroad) was a financial drain until its destruction by a tsunami in 1946. His Hawaiian Fiber Company, which operated a sisal plantation on the Ewa coral plain in southwestern Oahu, was ultimately also a failure. Nevertheless, Dillingham was one of the major business people in the early years of Hawaii's economic and industrial development.

== Death and legacy ==
He died on April 7, 1918, and was buried in Oahu Cemetery. Two days before, James Bicknell Castle, a distant cousin of his wife and a partner in sugarcane plantation ventures, died. His son Walter F. Dillingham (1875–1963) would also become a businessman in Oahu.

His wife Emma Louise Smith Dillingham wrote a book of poetry on Diamond Head. His daughter Mary Emma (known as May) Dillingham married Walter Francis Frear (1863–1948) who became Governor of the Territory of Hawaii 1907–1913. The next governor from 1913 to 1918, Lucius Pinkham, was a Democrat, although he had worked for Dillingham at OR&L 1892–1894 and as manager of his hardware company 1898–1903. Two sons died young, Charles Augustus Dillingham (1872–1874) and Alfred Hubbard Dillingham (1880–1880). Youngest son Harold Garfield Dillingham (October 9, 1881 – December 19, 1971) married Margaret Bayard Hyde-Smith in 1908 and had 5 children. Youngest daughter Marion Eleanor Dillingham (September 23, 1883 – January 19, 1972) married John Pinney Erdman in 1904 and had five children.
