= Walter F. Frear =

American judge

Walter Francis Frear
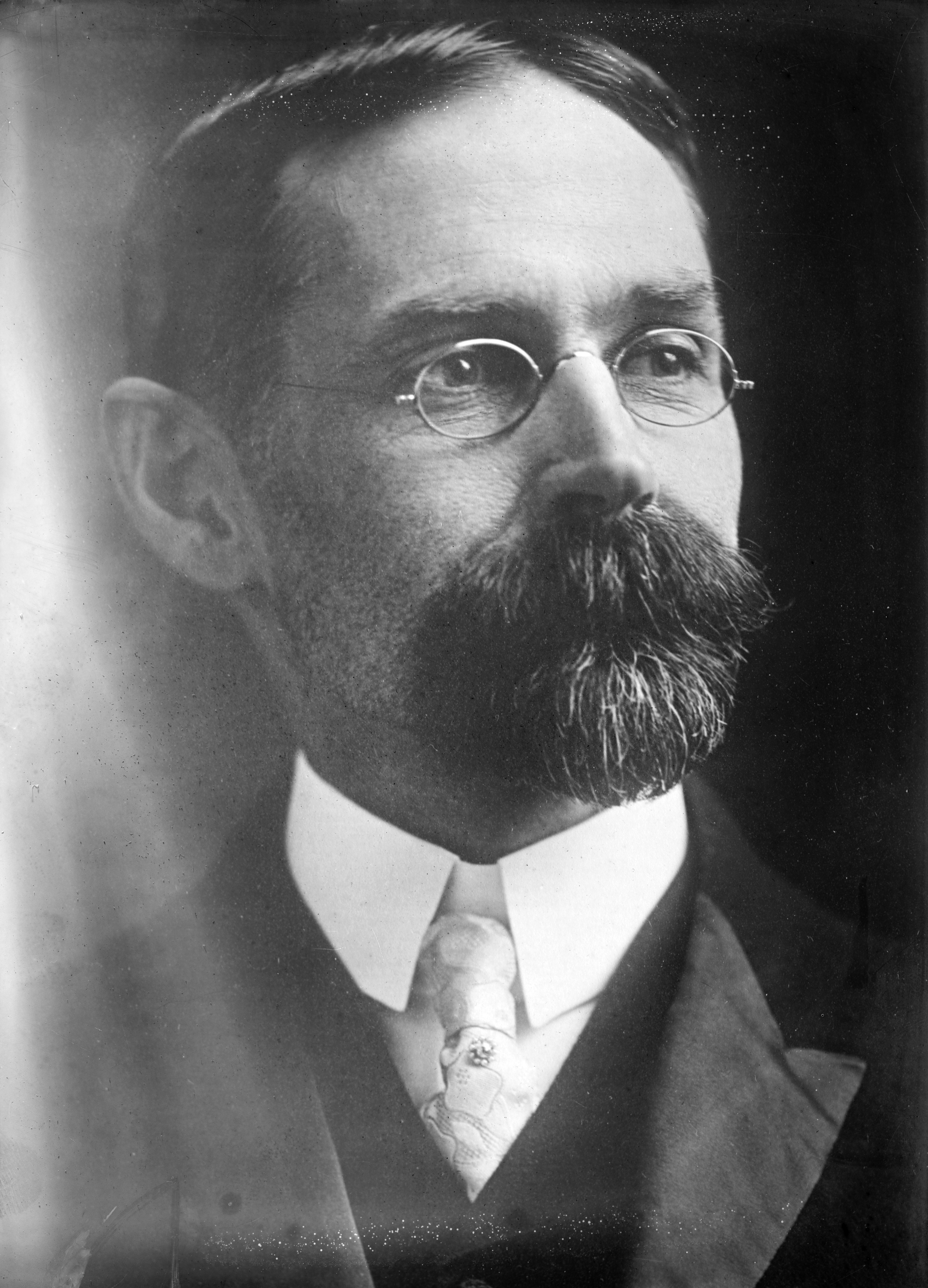

3rd Territorial Governor of Hawaii
- In office August 15, 1907 – November 30, 1913
- Appointed by: Theodore Roosevelt
- Preceded by: George R. Carter
- Succeeded by: Lucius E. Pinkham

Chief Justice of the Hawaiʻi Supreme Court

Personal details
- Born: October 29, 1863 Grass Valley, California
- Died: January 22, 1948 (aged 84) Honolulu, Territory of Hawaii
- Party: Republican
- Spouse: Mary Dillingham Frear
- Occupation: Lawyer, Judge

Walter Francis Frear (October 29, 1863 – January 22, 1948) was a lawyer and judge in the Kingdom of Hawaii and Republic of Hawaii, and the third Territorial Governor of Hawaii from 1907 to 1913.

== Life ==
Frear was born October 29, 1863, in Grass Valley, California. His father, Reverend Walter Frear, was born in Poughkeepsie, New York August 16, 1828, graduated from Yale in 1851, came to the Kingdom of Hawaii as a missionary, and then lived in California when he was born. His mother was Frances Elmira Foster. The family returned to Honolulu in 1870, where his father was pastor of the Fort Street Church until 1881. He graduated from Punahou School in 1881, Yale with a B.A. in 1885, and Yale law school in 1890. On August 1, 1893, he married Mary Emma Dillingham, the daughter of industrialist Benjamin Dillingham. They had two daughters: Virginia (1900–?) and Margaret (1908–?).

He was appointed as circuit judge on January 1, 1893, by Queen Liliʻuokalani. On March 7, 1893, he was promoted to serve on the Supreme Court of the Provisional Government. After the death of Albert Francis Judd, on July 5, 1900, he became Chief Justice of the Supreme Court of what was then the Territory of Hawaii.

Frear was appointed governor after George R. Carter by President Theodore Roosevelt on August 15, 1907. Alfred S. Hartwell replaced him as chief justice. He was a member of the Republican Party of Hawaii. After the election of Woodrow Wilson, Frear was replaced by the first governor from the Democratic Party of Hawaii, Lucius Pinkham in November 1913. He died January 22, 1948, in Honolulu, Hawaii.

The Frears founded the Mary D. and Walter F. Frear Eleemosynary Trust to sponsor educational projects. Frear Hall, a dormitory building built in the 1950s on the University of Hawaii at Manoa campus, was named after Governor Frear's wife Mary Dillingham Frear, a member of the University's Board of Regents from 1920 to 1943. The aging structure was demolished in 2006, to make way for a new dorm facility also called Frear Hall completed in the Summer of 2008.

The Frear home, known as “Arcadia,” was located at 1434 Punahou Street. It was built in 1907. Upon Mary's 1951 death it was donated to Punahou School. The property is currently occupied by Arcadia, a retirement residence.

The Frear Center, located at 1132 Bishop Street, was named after Walter and Mary Frear. It is a classroom building of Hawaii Pacific University, and was designed for information systems and computer science courses. The trust also supported Chaminade University of Honolulu.

== Personal life ==
Frear's father died on May 25, 1922, in Oakland, California. His mother was Frances Elmira Foster (January 29, 1836, in Boston, Massachusetts-February 7, 1924, in Oakland, California), and he had five siblings: Lizzie Lavina Freer, Hugo P. Frear, Henrietta Frear, Philip Foster Frear, Caroline Frear. Lizzie married Edward Frederick Woodward, who served as mayor of Santa Rosa, California, and as a California state senator from 1903 to 1906. He was also named the surveyor of the Port of San Francisco in 1909.

Frear descends from the initial Freer immigrant to the United States, Huguenot refugee Hugo Freer, who was a patentee, or founder, of New Paltz, New York. He also descends from Louis DuBois (Huguenot), another patentee of New Paltz. His 2nd great-grandfather, Colonel Johannes "John" Freer, commanded his own regiment during the American Revolutionary War (4th Ulster County Regiment).

His 4th cousins, once removed were J. Allen Frear Jr., a United States Senator from Delaware (1949-1961), and Romeo H. Freer, United States Congressman from West Virginia (1899-1901).

== Works ==
- Frear, Walter Francis (1922). "Hawaii" . In Chisholm, Hugh (ed.). Encyclopædia Britannica (12th ed.). London & New York: The Encyclopædia Britannica Company.
- Frear, Walter Francis (1935). Anti-missionary Criticism with Reference to Hawaii. Honolulu: Advertiser Publishing Co.
- Frear, Walter Francis (1947). Mark Twain and Hawaii. Lakeside Press.

Political offices
Preceded by George R. Carter	Territorial Governor of Hawaii; 1907 - 1913	Succeeded by Lucius E. Pinkham
Legal offices
Preceded by Albert Francis Judd	Chief Justice of the Hawaiʻi Supreme Court; 1900–1907	Succeeded by Alfred S. Hartwell
