= Emma Smith Dillingham =

Hawaiian poet, educator, and civic leader

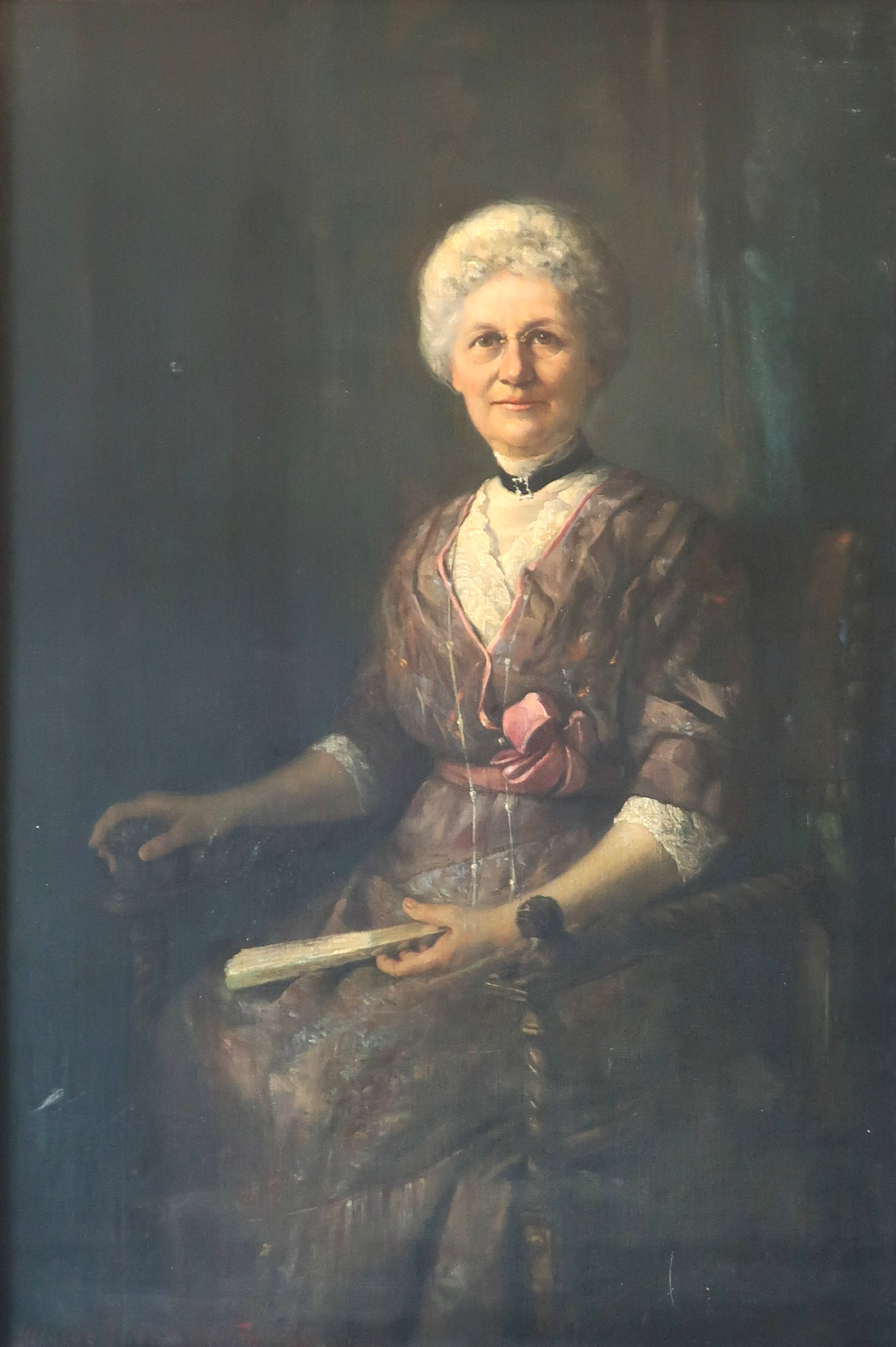
- 1912 portrait of Dillingham by George Burroughs Torrey

1st Regent of the Daughters of Hawaiʻi

Personal details
- Born: Emma Louise Smith; June 4, 1844 Honolulu, Kingdom of Hawaiʻi
- Died: August 15, 1920 (aged 76) Honolulu, Hawaii, U.S.
- Resting place: Oʻahu Cemetery
- Spouse: Benjamin Franklin Dillingham
- Children: Walter F. Dillingham; Mary Dillingham Frear
- Parent(s): Lowell Smith (father); Abigail Willis Tenney (mother)
- Education: Royal School; Punahou School
- Occupation: schoolteacher, poet, civic leader

Emma Louise Smith Dillingham (June 4, 1844 – August 15, 1920) was a Hawaiian poet, educator, and civic leader. She co-founded the Daughters of Hawaiʻi and established the Young Women's Christian Association branch in Oʻahu.

== Early life and family ==
Dillingham was born Emma Louise Smith in Honolulu on June 4, 1844, the third child of Rev. Lowell Smith and Abigail Willis Tenney Smith. Her parents were American Protestant missionaries who came to the Kingdom of Hawaiʻi with the American Board of Commissioners for Foreign Missions. At the time of her birth, her father was pastor of Kaumakapili Church.

She attended the Royal School before transferring to the Punahou School when she was thirteen. Dillingham graduated from Punahou in 1863.

== Adult life ==
Following her graduation from Punahou School, Dillingham was employed there as an instructor. She taught for a year and then joined her parents on a trip to the United States, where she studied music. When she returned to Hawaii, she worked as a music instructor at Punahou and as a teacher at the Royal School.

On April 26, 1869, she married Benjamin Franklin Dillingham. They had multiple children, including Mary Dillingham Frear and Walter F. Dillingham.

In 1891, she wrote a book of poetry on Diamond Head.

Dillingham was an active leader in women's and civic affairs in Honolulu, organizing the Oʻahu branch of the Young Women's Christian Association in her home in 1900 and lending her support to the Salvation Army.

On November 18, 1903, she co-founded the Daughters of Hawaiʻi along with Sarah Coan Waters, Lucinda Severance, Ellen Armstrong Weaver, Anne Alexander Dickey, Cornelia Hall Jones, and Anna M. Paris, to preserve Hawaiian history and culture. She served as the organization's first regent.
