= Fidelia Adams Johnson =

American educator

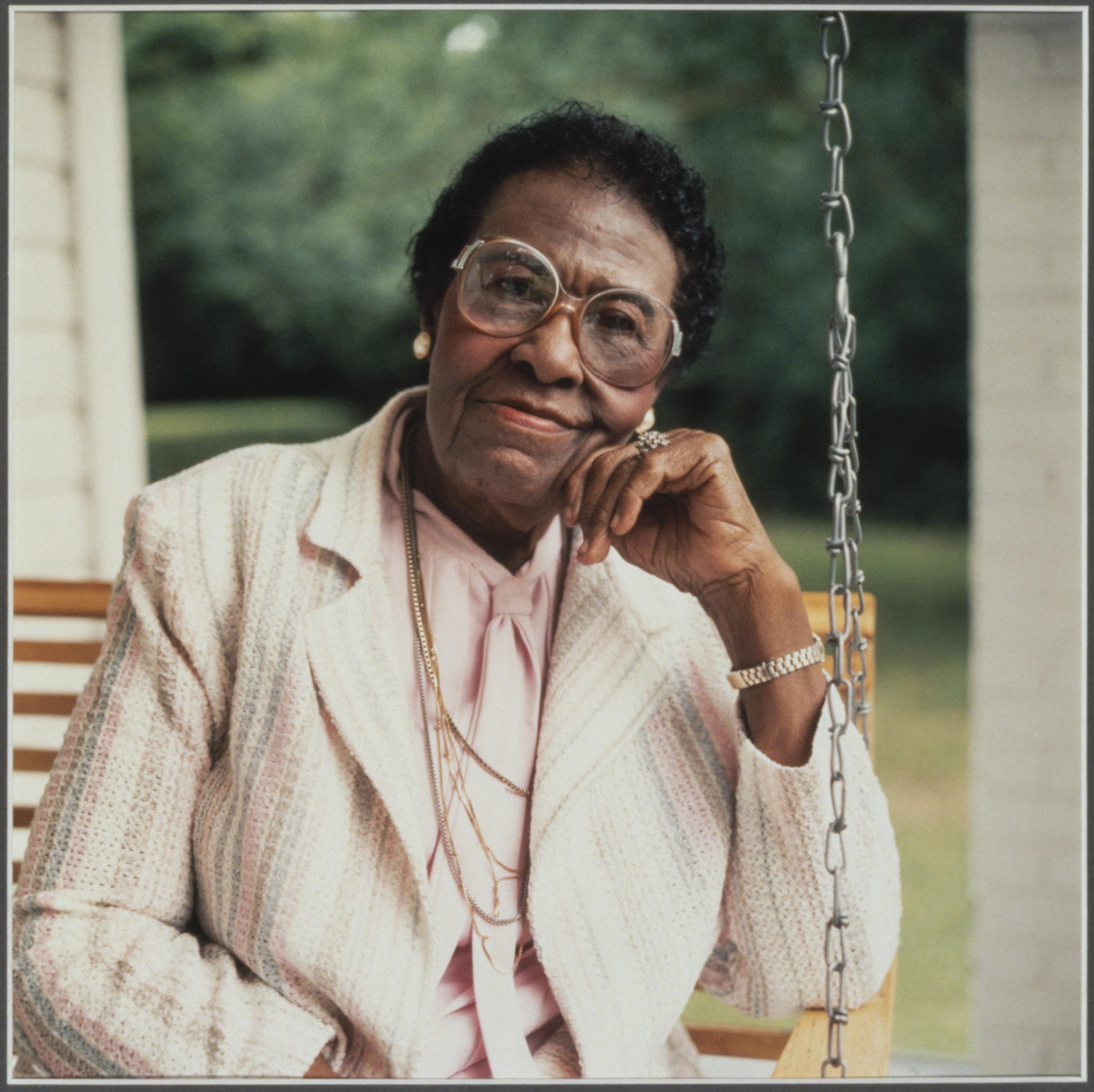
- Born: Fidelia Olin Adams; April 17, 1905; Grambling, Louisiana, U.S.
- Died: May 14, 1996 (aged 91); Ruston, Louisiana, U.S.
- Occupations: Educator, athlete, coach
- Spouse: Ozias Johnson
- Parent: Charles P. Adams
- Relatives: Lewis Adams (grandfather)

Fidelia Olin Adams Johnson (April 17, 1905 – May 14, 1996) was an American athlete and educator. She taught home economics and coached basketball at Grambling State University from 1929 to 1970.

== Early life and education ==
Adams was born in Grambling, Louisiana, the elder daughter of Charles P. Adams and Martha Norman Adams. Her father was the founder and president of Grambling State University. Her grandfather Lewis Adams helped found Tuskegee University. She was named for Fidelia Jewett, a white philanthropist who helped fund the founding of the North Louisiana Agricultural and Industrial Institute.

She graduated from Tuskegee Institute in 1929. She lettered in basketball all four years at Tuskegee, and was team captain. She earned a master's degree at the University of Iowa in 1945, with further studies at Antioch University and Michigan State University. She was a member of the Alpha Kappa Alpha sorority.

== Career ==
Johnson taught home economics at Grambling State University, where she also coached women's basketball, chaired the home economics department, served as dean of women, and was a member of the school's board of directors. She was known as "Mama Fi" on campus. She launched Grambling's "field service program", an innovative outreach project. She also started the school's home economics education, early childhood education, and institutional management majors. She retired from the university in 1970.

In 1925 Adams spoke at the third annual Hampton Builders' Conference in Virginia. In 1974 she was inducted into the Tuskegee University Athletics Hall of Fame. In 1978 she gave an oral history interview for the Black Women Oral History Project. She was inducted into the Grambling Hall of Fame in 1982.

== Personal life ==
Adams married fellow Tuskegee alumnus and Grambling sports coach Ozias Johnson in 1934. Her husband died in 1980, and she died in 1996, at the age of 91, in Ruston, Louisiana. The Charles P. Adams House in Grambling was named to the National Register of Historic Places, and donated to the Grambling State University Foundation.
