= Ellen Armstrong Weaver =

Hawaiian clubwoman

- Born: Ellen Eliza Chapman Armstrong; 1844; Honolulu, Kingdom of Hawaii
- Died: 1924 (aged 79–80); Berkeley, California, U.S.
- Occupation: clubwoman
- Spouse: Philip L. Weaver
- Children: 3
- Parent(s): Richard Armstrong (father); Clarissa Chapman (mother)
- Relatives: Samuel C. Armstrong (brother); William Nevins Armstrong (brother); Reuben Atwater Chapman (uncle)

Ellen Eliza Chapman Armstrong Weaver (1844–1924) was a Hawaiian clubwoman who co-founded the Daughters of Hawaii.

== Early life and family ==
Weaver was born in 1844, one of ten children of Richard Armstrong and Clarissa Chapman Armstrong, who were Protestant missionaries affiliated with the American Board of Commissioners for Foreign Missions. Her father served as Minister of Public Instruction under Kamehameha III. She was the sister of William Nevins Armstrong and Samuel C. Armstrong. The Armstrong family were a prominent family in the Kingdom of Hawaii.

In 1903, she co-founded the Daughters of Hawaii along with Emma Smith Dillingham, Anna M. Paris, Anne Alexander Dickey, Sarah Coan Waters, Lucinda Clark Severance, and Cornelia Hall Jones. She was also a charter member of the Century Club of San Francisco.

She was married to Philip L. Weaver the mother of Judge Philip Weaver, Henrietta Weaver Fangel, and Morgan Atkin Jones. She served as Custodian of the Sutro Library in San Francisco from 1898 to 1911.

She died on September 29, 1924, in Berkeley, California. She had been living in California for five months with her friend, Marry Bettis. Her funeral was held on October 2, 1924, at Truman's residence chapel in Oakland, California.
