= Eugene D. Dimmick =

American Brigadier General (1840–1935)

Eugene Dumont Dimmick
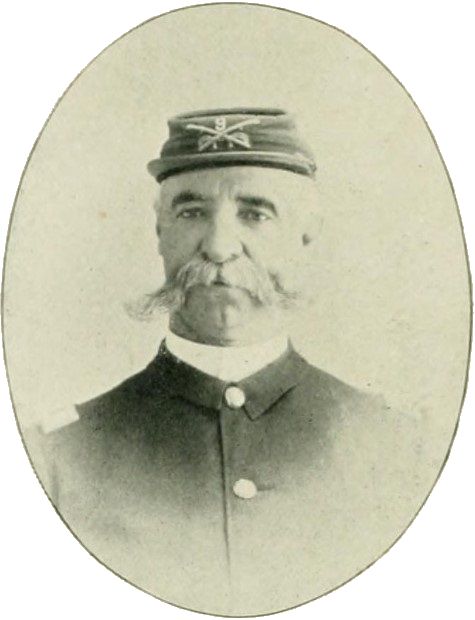
- Born: July 31, 1840; Athens, New York, U.S.
- Died: November 16, 1935 (aged 95); Palo Alto, California, U.S.
- Burial place: Arlington National Cemetery; Arlington, Virginia, U.S.
- Spouses: Mary Caldwell (m. 1863; died 1882) Florence Palmer Hazard (m. 1896; died 1913)
- Military career
- Branch: Union Army; United States Army
- Service years: 1861–1863; 1864–1866; 1867–1903
- Rank: Brigadier General
- Unit: 5th New York Cavalry Regiment
- Commands: 9th Cavalry Regiment
- Conflicts: See battles: American Civil War; Jackson's Valley campaign; Battle of Good's Farm; Northern Virginia Campaign; Battle of Cedar Mountain; Battle of Thoroughfare Gap; Second Battle of Bull Run; Battle of Chantilly; Maryland campaign; Battle of South Mountain; Battle of Antietam; Warrenton Junction Raid; Gettysburg campaign; Battle of Gettysburg; Battle of Boonsboro; Battle of Williamsport (POW); Bristoe campaign; Battle of Culpeper Court House; Victorio's War; Crow War; Spanish–American War; Battle of San Juan Hill

Eugene Dumont Dimmick (1840–1935) was an American Brigadier General of the American Civil War, the Crow War and the Spanish–American War. He was known for his participation in the execution of the Crow chief Sword Bearer and for leading the 9th Cavalry Regiment during the Battle of San Juan Hill after its previous commander, John Morrison Hamilton, was killed during the battle.

== American Civil War ==
Dimmick was born on July 31, 1840, in Athens, New York on July 31, 1840, as the son of Elnathan Nye and Emily Jane (née McCowan) Dimmick. He began his military career by enlisting within Company G of the 2nd New Jersey State Militia on April 26, 1861, but after initially being discharged on July 31, 1861, he re-enlisted within Company M the 5th New York Cavalry Regiment on October 7, 1861, as a First Sergeant before being promoted to Second Lieutenant on May 9, 1862. After being promoted to First Lieutenant on October 10, 1862, he fought in the battles of Good's Farm, Culpeper Court House, Cedar Mountain, Second Bull Run, South Mountain, Antietam, Chantilly, Warrenton Junction, Thoroughfare Gap, Gettysburg, Boonsboro and Williamsport as he would be severely wounded and imprisoned.

After he was released, Dimmick was promoted to captain on July 5, 1863, but was later honorably discharged in November of that year due to his wounds. At some point in 1863, Dimmick married Mary Caldwell. She would leave Dimmick widowed in 1882 after her death. He later became a Second Lieutenant at the 18th Regiment Veteran Reserve Corps in February 1864. During the Fenian Raids, Dimmick was stationed at Albany, New York and the Canada–United States border before being mustered out on June 30, 1866.

== Service in the frontier ==
Dimmick re-enlisted in the Regular Army on August 9, 1867, as a Second Lieutenant within the 9th Cavalry Regiment. He met up with the regiment at Texas, where he was promoted to First Lieutenant on January 10, 1870. The regiment was stationed there until 1875, when they were ordered to change departments and serve at the Department of the Missouri. He was initially stationed at Fort Wallace, Fort Lyon in 1876 and finally at Fort Union in 1877 and 1878. Dimmick then served in Victorio's War across New Mexico, Arizona and Chihuahua, where he was brevetted Captain on September 23, 1879, for his service in the Black Range Mountains of New Mexico. During his brief service of recruitment from 1882 to 1884, he was promoted to Captain on October 25, 1883. He then assisted the boomers in settling within the Indian Territory before being transferred to Fort McKinney in 1885. During 1887, he participated in the Crow War as he commanded the D and H troop of the 9th Cavalry Regiment and took part in the execution of Chief Sword Bearer. In 1896, Dimmick remarried to Florence Palmer Hazard, who died in 1913.

== Spanish–American War ==
Upon the outbreak of the Spanish–American War, Dimmick remained as a Captain of the 9th Cavalry Regiment, but after its commander, John Morrison Hamilton was killed in action, Dimmick assumed command of the regiment. For gallantry in service, he was promoted to Major of the 5th Cavalry Regiment on July 13, 1898. For the rest of the war, Dimmick was stationed at Matanzas as he commanded the cavalry there and served as an associate judge of the United States Provisional Court at Matanzas in 1899.

== Later years and retirement ==
After the war, Dimmick was promoted to Lieutenant Colonel of the 10th Cavalry Regiment on March 1, 1901. He later received a further promotion of Colonel on February 22, 1903, with his last post being at Fort Ethan Allen. Dimmick retired on March 2, 1903, and was advanced to Brigadier General on the retired list by Congress on April 23, 1904. He died on November 16, 1935, while at Palo Alto, California. A week later, Dimmick was interred at Arlington National Cemetery next to his second wife.
