= Reuben Atwater Chapman =

American judge

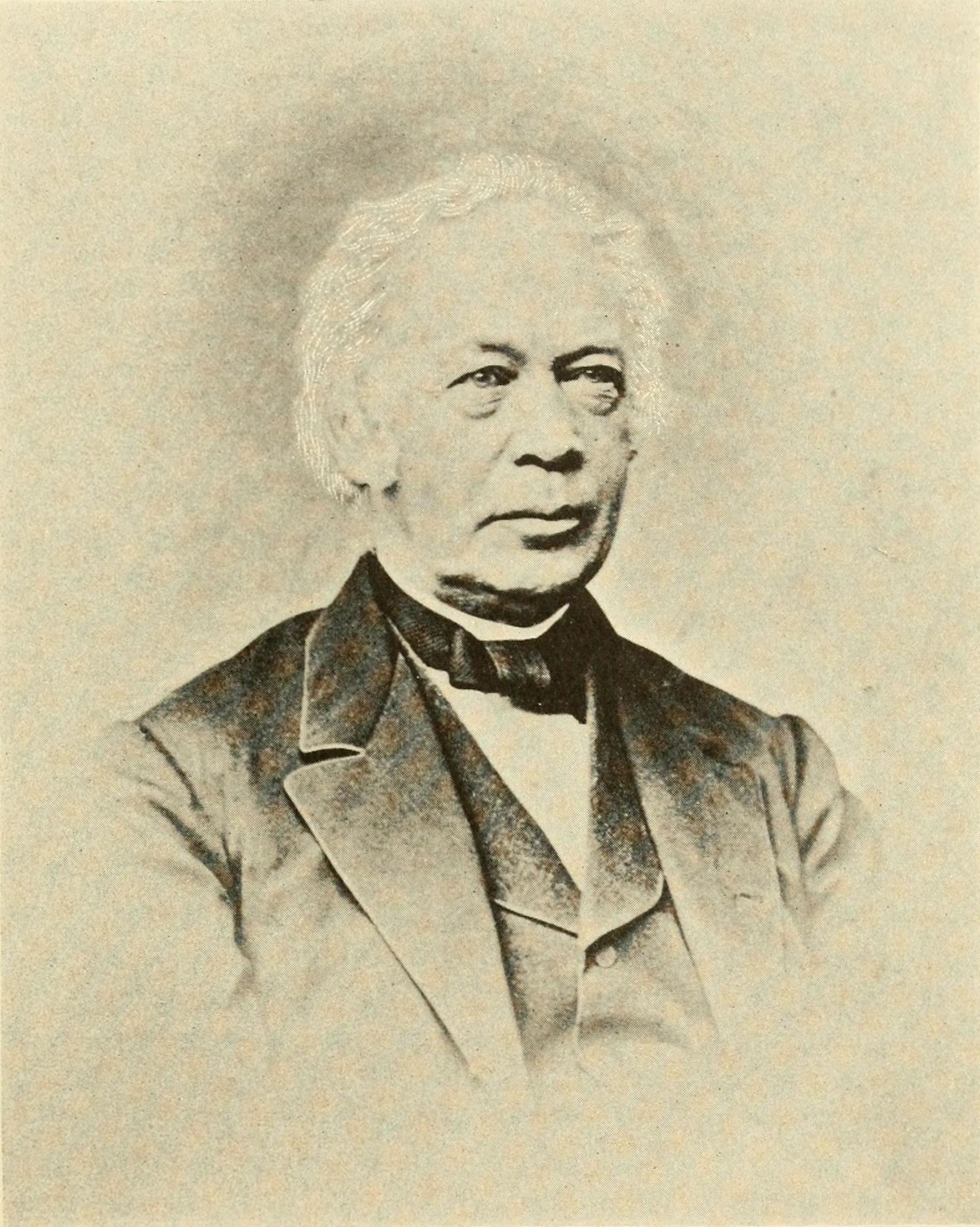
Chief Justice Reuben Atwater Chapman Sept. 20, 1801-June 28, 1873

Reuben Atwater Chapman (Sept. 20, 1801 Russell, Massachusetts – June 28, 1873 Flüelen, Switzerland) was an American attorney who served as chief justice of the Massachusetts Supreme Court from 1868 until his death in 1873. As a youth he was employed as a store clerk in Blandford, Massachusetts when he was given the opportunity at the age of 19 to read law as a clerk in a law office. Admitted to the bar, he successively practiced in Westfield, Monson, and Ware, before settling in Springfield, Mass., where he practiced in partnership with Whig politician George Ashmun as Chapman & Ashmun. The firm became one of the most successful in the state and in 1860 Chapman was appointed an associate justice of the state supreme court, subsequently being elevated to chief justice in 1868. He was a presidential elector for Lincoln in 1860, and served on the Harvard Board of Overseers. He handled some legal matters for John Brown when Brown was in business in Springfield, and later, when Brown was imprisoned in Virginia facing hanging after the abortive Harper's Ferry raid, he wrote to Chapman asking him to either come himself or send legal assistance: "I have money in hand here to the amount of $250 [...] do not send an ultra abolitionist," which Chapman was unable to do at the time. Chapman died in Switzerland in 1873.

His younger sister was Clarissa Chapman Armstrong, a missionary teacher in the Hawaiian Islands. Through her, Reuben Atwater Chapman was uncle to Samuel Chapman Armstrong, an American Civil War general and founder of Hampton Institute, Ellen Armstrong Weaver, a clubwoman who co-founded the Daughters of Hawaii, and to William Nevins Armstrong, Attorney General in the Kingdom of Hawaii.
