= John Morrison Hamilton =

Canadian-American lieutenant colonel

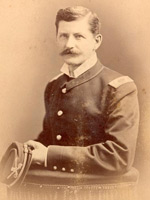
- Born: June 1, 1839; Charleston, Upper Canada
- Died: July 1, 1898 (aged 59); Near Santiago de Cuba, Oriente, Cuba, Spain
- Burial place: Arlington National Cemetery, Arlington, Virginia, U.S.
- Spouse: Isabel Bowie (m. 1871)
- Military career
- Allegiance: United States
- Branch: United States Army
- Service years: 1861–1898
- Rank: Lieutenant Colonel
- Units: 33rd New York Infantry Regiment; 9th United States Colored Infantry Regiment
- Commands: 9th Cavalry Regiment
- Conflicts: List: American Civil War; Manassas campaign; First Battle of Bull Run; Northern Virginia campaign; Second Battle of Bull Run; Maryland campaign; Battle of Antietam; Fredericksburg campaign; Battle of Fredericksburg; Chancellorsville campaign; Battle of Chancellorsville Apache Wars Great Sioux War of 1876 Bannock War Ute Wars Ghost Dance War Spanish–American War; Santiago campaign; Battle of San Juan Hill †

John Morrison Hamilton was a Canadian-born American Lieutenant Colonel during the mid and late 19th century. He was known for his participation across the American Civil War, the American Indian Wars and the Spanish–American War with the latter leading to his death during the Battle of San Juan Hill.

== American Civil War ==
Despite being born in Upper Canada on 1 June, 1839, he moved to Geneva, New York around 1860 as he had relatives there. Upon the outbreak of the American Civil War, he enlisted as private within the 33rd New York Infantry Regiment and saw active combat of the First Bull Run, Second Bull Run, Antietam, Fredericksburg and Chancellorsville before his three-year tenure expired in June 1863. He re-enlisted in December 1863 as a Second Lieutenant within the 9th United States Colored Infantry Regiment and was brevetted to Captain by the end of the war, maintaining the permanent rank of First Lieutenant.

== American Indian Wars ==
He continued to serve in the U.S. Army after the war, serving as a Captain within the 39th Infantry Regiment at Brownsville, Texas and later at Louisiana to enforce Reconstruction policies. He was then transferred to the 5th Cavalry Regiment, serving as a recruiting officer at Brooklyn where he would meet Isabel Bowie and they got married on 28 June, 1871, and she'd accompany him across the western frontier. Between 1872 and 1874, Hamilton served under Major General George Crook during the Apache Wars, earning a citation of "conspicuous services and gallantry" for his service on February and March 1873. He'd later take part a punitive expedition against Dull Knife's forces after the Battle of the Little Bighorn. He'd also take part in the Bannock War and the Ute Wars from 1879 to 1880.

Hamilton also became a naturalized American citizen by 1882 and moved to Fort Robinson with his family. They'd later move to Fort Riley by the end of the 1880s and Hamilton was promoted to Major in 1887. He was then transferred to the 1st Cavalry Regiment and served at Fort Custer and Fort Assinniboine and would participate in the Ghost Dance War. During the early 1890s, Hamilton served as the Acting Inspector General in the Departments of the Columbia and the Platte but shortly after, returned to the 1st Cavalry Regiment at Fort Sill in 1895. He also received his promotion to Lieutenant Colonel on 1897 while within the 9th Cavalry Regiment at Fort Robinson where he'd encounter Frederic Remington and Hamilton would be featured in Remington's work The Essentials of Fort Adobe.

== Spanish-American War ==
Tensions with Spain began to increase due to the ongoing Cuban War of Independence and the 9th Cavalry Regiment began making movements south for Chattanooga, Tennessee and Tampa, Florida to prepare for an intervention in Cuba. After its previous colonel fell to illness, Hamilton assumed command of the regiment as the boarded the SS Miami as he penned his final letter to his wife while aboard the ship, On 1 July, 1898, the 9th Cavalry along with the 6th Cavalry Regiment, the 10th Cavalry Regiment and the Rough Riders made up the main skirmish line of the Battle of San Juan Hill. During the battle, Hamilton waved his hat and encouraged his troops to overrun the Spanish positions upon the top of the hill but while directing his troops, Hamilton was shot in the throat, instantly killing him. He was buried later in the day with a wooden headboard with a bottle with his body to ensure identification. In his honor, the Cavalry Division HQ was renamed to Camp Hamilton as Lieutenant James H. Reeves described him as a "a gallant, true, brave soldier". He was then re-interred at Geneva, New York and after 1903, he was given his final burial at the Arlington National Cemetery with full military honors.
