= Puaaiki =

Hawaiian Protestant preacher (c. 1785–1844)

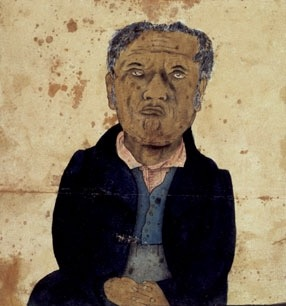
Watercolor sketch by Clarissa Chapman Armstrong, c. 1840

Bartimeus Lalana Puaʻaiki (c. 1785 – February 21, 1844) was an early convert and the first Native Hawaiian to be licensed to preach Protestant Christianity. Prior to his conversion, he served as a hula dancer in the court of King Kamehameha II and Queen Kamāmalu.

== Life ==
Born circa 1785, in Waikapu on the island of Maui, Puaʻaiki was encumbered with birth defects which rendered him short-statured and visually impaired (partially blind) in later life. His mother attempted to bury him but a solicitous relative rescued him. He was given the name Puaʻaiki meaning "little pig" in the Hawaiian language. In the court of King Kamehameha II he served as a hula dancer and was a member of the retinue of Queen Kamāmalu. After the arrival of Christian missionaries in 1820, he converted to the new faith.

After conversion, he became known as the "Blind Preacher of Maui" or "Blind Bartimeus", after the Biblical Bartimaeus who was healed by Jesus. In 1841, Puaʻaiki became the first Native Hawaiian licensed to preach at his small congregation at Honuaula, Maui. As a religious teacher, he was not fully ordained and was more or less under the supervision of another missionary. David Malo, the celebrated Hawaiian educator and historian, became the second licensed religious teacher in 1843. It would not be until 1849 when, James Kekela was ordained as the first Native Hawaiian Protestant minister. His only known authored works were recently discovered in the Ke Kumu Hawaii newspaper and consisted of three articles, all addressed to the church at that time. The articles were written while he was ministering in both Hilo, Hawaii and Wailuku, Maui.

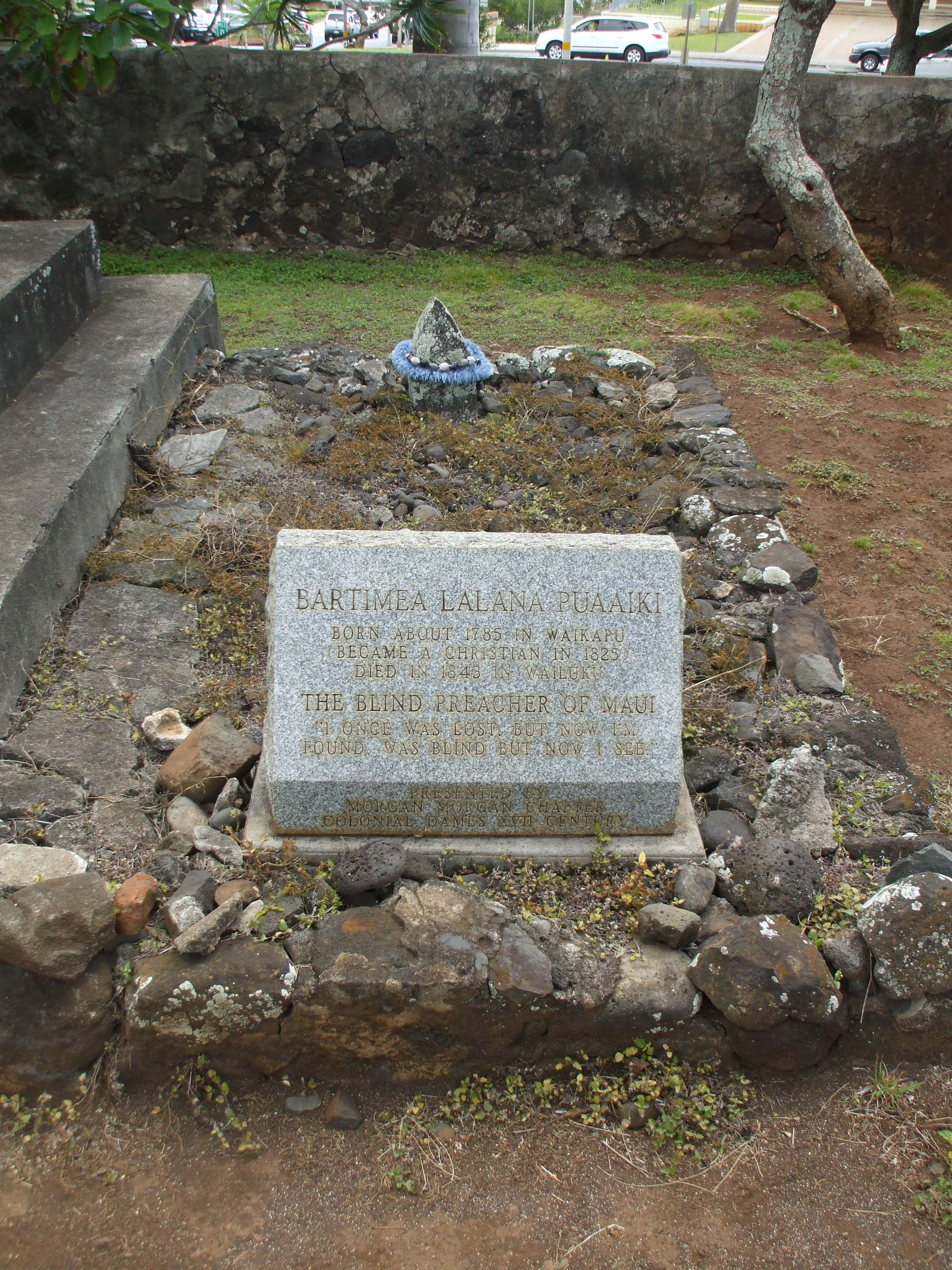
Gravesite at Kaʻahumanu Church

He died on February 21, 1844, at his post in Wailuku. He was buried on February 23, 1844, at the cemetery ground of the Kaʻahumanu Church. In the same year, American missionary Jonathan Smith Green wrote Notices of the Life, Character, and Labors of the Late Bartimeus L. Puaaiki, of Wailuku, Maui, Sandwich Islands in his memory.

== Bibliography ==
- American Board of Commissioners for Foreign Missions (1842). The Missionary Herald. Vol. 38. Boston: Published for the Board by Samuel T. Armstrong. OCLC 1758344.
- Day, Arthur Grove (1984). History Makers of Hawaii: a Biographical Dictionary. Honolulu: Mutual Publishing of Honolulu. ISBN 978-0-935180-09-1. OCLC 11087565.
- Green, Jonathan S. (1844). Notices of the Life, Character, and Labors of the Late Bartimeus L. Puaaiki, of Wailuku, Maui, Sandwich Islands. Lahainaluna: Press of the Mission Seminary. OCLC 14915363.
- Forbes, David W., ed. (2000). Hawaiian National Bibliography 1780–1900, Volume 2: 1831–1850. Vol. 2. Honolulu: University of Hawaii Press. ISBN 978-0-8248-2379-5.
- Kuykendall, Ralph Simpson (1965) [1938]. The Hawaiian Kingdom 1778–1854, Foundation and Transformation. Vol. 1. Honolulu: University of Hawaii Press. ISBN 0-87022-431-X. OCLC 47008868.
- Lange, Raeburn (2006). Island Ministers: Indigenous Leadership in Nineteenth Century Pacific Islands Christianity (PDF). Christchurch, New Zealand: Macmillan Brown Centre for Pacific Studies, University of Canterbury. ISBN 978-1-74076-176-5.
