= Sutro Library =

Branch of California State Library

- Location: San Francisco, California, U.S.
- Type: Government
- Established: 1917; 109 years ago
- Branch of: California State Library

Adolph Sutro in his library

The Sutro Library is a branch of the California State Library located in San Francisco on the campus of San Francisco State University. The foundation of the library's collection was assembled by former San Francisco mayor, engineer, entrepreneur, and philanthropist Adolph Sutro. The library was deeded to the State of California by Sutro's heirs with the stipulation that it never leave the city limits of San Francisco, filling his desire to provide the city with a public research library. It was formally given to California State Library in 1913, and opened to the public in 1917. Notably, half of the Sutro collection survived the "Great Fire" after the San Francisco earthquake of 1906. Collection highlights include 125,000 rare books, antiquarian maps, and archival collections, as well as a genealogical library.

== Background ==
Adolph Sutro (1830-1898) came to San Francisco in 1850 at the height of the Gold Rush. He made his money as a mining engineer in Virginia City, Nevada - where the Comstock Lode was discovered and where he built an eponymous tunnel. He came back to San Francisco in 1879 and began purchasing land - eventually owning around 1/8th of the real property in the city.

Sutro wanted to provide San Francisco with a public research collection. To this end, Sutro began collecting items for his library in the late 1870s and by the time of his death in 1898 had amassed a collection of 300,000 to 500,000 rare books including 4,000 incunabula (the first printed books), which according to contemporary news accounts was the seventh largest in the world. The works in the collection cover science and engineering, religion, natural history, philosophy, British history, Mexican history, and theater. When Sutro realized the magnitude of the task of building a research collection, he hired German and British experts to go to auctions and other book sales to make acquisitions.

== History of the Library ==
The Sutro Library didn't have a permanent location until 2012 when it moved to the fifth and sixth floors of the J. Paul Leonard Library – Sutro Library, located on the campus of San Francisco State University. The library existed in many different locations throughout San Francisco. In 1895 Sutro who held negotiations with the University of California Regents to propose the library site be on the campus of “Affiliated Colleges” of the University of California in San Francisco. However, the same year Sutro became mayor of San Francisco, diverting his attention to politics. That, coupled with his declining health, prevented him from erecting a building to house the library.

When Sutro died in 1898, the collection remained in limbo, housed in two warehouses in downtown San Francisco – one in the Montgomery Block and the other at Pine and Battery Street. It took a little over a decade for Sutro's family to settle the estate, and it was during this period when the 1906 San Francisco Earthquake destroyed approximately two thirds of the original collection. In 1913, the family and the State of California came to a final agreement which "was to the effect that the library be given to the State, providing the State took it over at once. It was also provided that a large oil painting of Adolph Sutro – a painting now at Sutro Heights – be kept and exhibited with the books, and that the whole be thrown open to the public not later than January 1, 1917." The Sutro Library was officially deeded to the State of California in 1913 by Sutro's heirs with the stipulation that it never leave the city limits of San Francisco.

Since its donation in 1913, and because Sutro Library is required to remain within the city limits of San Francisco, it has been housed in several locations. After it was accepted by the State of California, the California State legislature passed a bill which appropriated $70,000 for its maintenance. In October 1913, California State Librarian J.L. Gillis leased the third floor of Stanford's Lane Medical Department, located in San Francisco at the time, to house the Sutro Library. It opened to the public in 1917. During the first year, the collection increased by 12,000 volumes, mainly through gifts. In 1917 the California Genealogical Society's collection merged with Sutro's.

Gillis had initially hoped the legislature would agree to fund a building for Sutro Library in San Francisco's Civic Center. However, that funding never materialized. In 1922 Sutro Library was moved to San Francisco Public Library at Civic Center. Although this move was an effort to make it available to the public, because of its storage in the basement, it had the reverse effect. In 1933 the Great Depression threatened the existence of Sutro. Among other cuts proposed by the State Legislature was to “eliminate Sutro library, San Francisco, transfer books to Sacramento or return to donor. This didn't happen, and instead public pressure forced the State to allow the library to remain at San Francisco Public Library. In the late 1930s the Work Projects Administration's Sutro Library project cataloged, created annotated bibliographies, and other publications regarding Sutro's collection.

In 1959 the Department of Finance deleted the maintenance fund from the State Library budget prompting a search for another location to house the Sutro Library. There was a public debate as to where the new home for the library would be. The University of San Francisco (USF) was proposed as a location, but was met with backlash. Sutro's granddaughters, Alberta Morbio Pruett and Marguerite Morbio de Mailly felt that “the original donors expected the Sutro Library to be housed in a nonsectarian environment.” And as USF is a private institution, the San Francisco Public Library Commission opposed the move. It was eventually settled in 1959, and a 20-year lease was signed to allow residence of the Sutro Library at the University of San Francisco, and in early 1960 the Sutro Library was transferred to USF's Gleeson Library.

In 1981, the lease at Gleeson Library expired without an option to renew. The proposal was made and later decided to transport the temporary chambers of the California State Senate to a largely free site at San Francisco State University. In 1983 it was relocated behind San Francisco State University on Winston Drive. In 2002, a bond measure was approved by the governor and state legislature to fund a joint-use facility, and in 2012 the Sutro Library moved to its permanent home in the J. Paul Leonard Library – Sutro Library.

== Sutro Library Collections ==
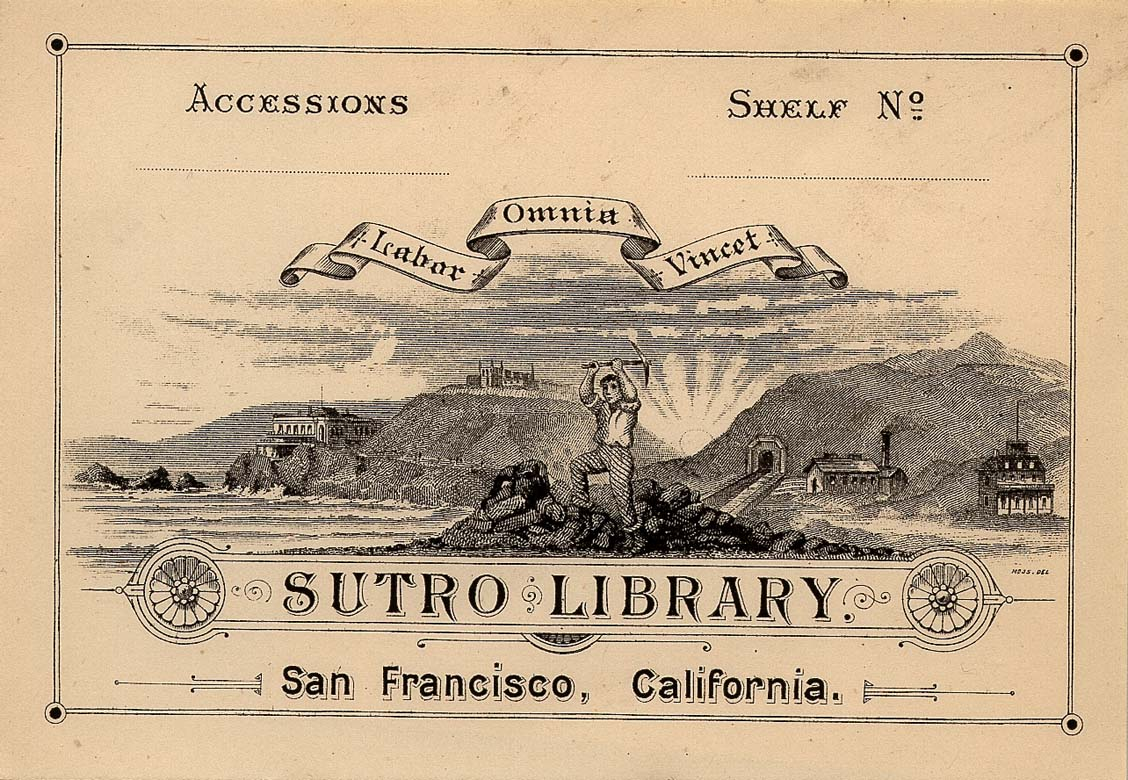
Sutro Library bookplate, with the motto, Labor omnia vincit (work conquers all). Illustration features the Cliff House, Sutro Heights and the Sutro Tunnel in Dayton, NV.

The Sutro Library is home to resources that cover a broad range of subjects. There is a collection of thirteenth- and fourteenth-century Yemenite Hebraica, as well as fourteenth- and fifteenth-century Italian notarial manuscripts. It houses over 5,000 Renaissance imprints, military science, astronomy, and philosophy; it also has resources from the Middle Ages, the Age of Discovery, the Enlightenment, and the Industrial Revolution. There is heavy representation of British history, including the first British newspapers, resources on the English Civil War, the Commonwealth, and the Restoration. In addition, the library holds religious tracts and church documents, botany and natural history, medical science, science and technology, and has one of the most comprehensive collections on the Mexican Republic in the world. Although not part of the original Adolph Sutro collection, there is large genealogy collection which consists of regional and county histories, directories, gazetteers, biographies, ship passenger lists, periodicals. cemetery records, U.S. census records, and over 8,000 family histories.

=== Shakespeare ===
Sutro houses two copies of the First Folio, one bound, and the other in parts. It also has the Second, Third, and Fourth imprints of Shakespeare's comedies, histories, and tragedies. Additionally, the library contains a collection of Shakespeariana in addition to materials on theater history, and Restoration drama.

=== Mexican Pamphlets ===
The Mexican pamphlets date from 1623 through the 1800s. There are approximately 30,000 pamphlets in the collection, primarily on the political history of Mexico during the outbreak of the revolution against Spain (1810, 1811), the promulgation of the Constitution of Cadiz (1812), its reaffirmation (1820), and the establishment of the Mexican Republic (1821-1823). These pamphlets are primary sources to Mexico's history in the eighteenth and nineteenth centuries. Works include pamphlets by Fernández de Lizardi, Rafael Dávila, and Pablo de Villavicencio (pen name: El Payo del Rosario). Many of the pamphlets in the collection are unique copies.

=== Hebraica, 1200s-1800s ===
Adolph Sutro acquired this part of his collection in 1884 from the estate of Moses W. Shapira, a Jerusalem bookseller and antiquities dealer. This collection is primarily Yemenite in origin and documents the intellectual and religious life of Jewish Yemenites. There are approximately 167 items including scrolls, books, and scroll fragments with subjects ranging from Bible commentaries to hermeneutics, lexicons, prayerbooks, philosophy, Cabalistic works, poetry, and medicine. Many of the items are undated and in fragile condition.

=== English Pamphlets ===
The collection of English pamphlets at the Sutro Library consists of over 12,000 tracts relating to British politics, religion, and culture from the 1500s through the 1800s. Many pertain to the Poor Laws and the Corn Laws, as well as the English Civil War, the Commonwealth, and the Restoration. In addition to this there are pamphlets relating to the American Revolution.

=== German Pamphlets ===
There are approximately 150 sixteenth century German Reformation pamphlets, many by Martin Luther, as well as Melanchthon (an intellectual leader and Luther collaborator).

== WPA Sutro Library Project ==
The Works Progress Administration (WPA) funded library projects throughout the United States and employed around 14,000 people during the Great Depression. The WPA provided cataloging and repair, but they also built 200 new libraries, 3,400 new reading rooms, as well as 5,800 traveling libraries to serve remote communities. From 1938 to 1941, Dr. Paul Radin led the WPA's Sutro Library Project (WPA project number 665-08-3-236), during which time thousands of items were cataloged, including the English Pamphlet collection and the Mexicana Pamphlets.

== Sutro Librarians ==
Librarians by date range
Date range	Librarian(s)
1888 to 1898	George Moss, Dr. Solomon Roubin (Hebrew scholar), Fredric Beecher Perkins
1898 to 1911	Ellen Armstrong Weaver – Custodian, Will Irwin – Research Scholar/Library Assistant
1917 to 1923	Laura Steffens Suggett
1924 to 1946	William E. Parker
1924 to 1952	Helen M. Bruner
1950 to 1979	Richard H. Dillon
1958 to 1966	Dorothy E. Jones
1964 to 1987	Eleanor Capelle
1966 to 1981	Dorothy Geraldine (Gerry) Davis
1979 to 1980	Gary Kurutz
1981 to 2001	Frank Glover
1985 to 1986	Thomas Fante
1987 to 2003	Clyde Janes
1998 to 2011	Martha Whittaker
2006 to 2015	Haleh Motiey
2016 -	Mattie Taormina
