= Clarissa Chapman Armstrong =

American missionary (1805–1891)

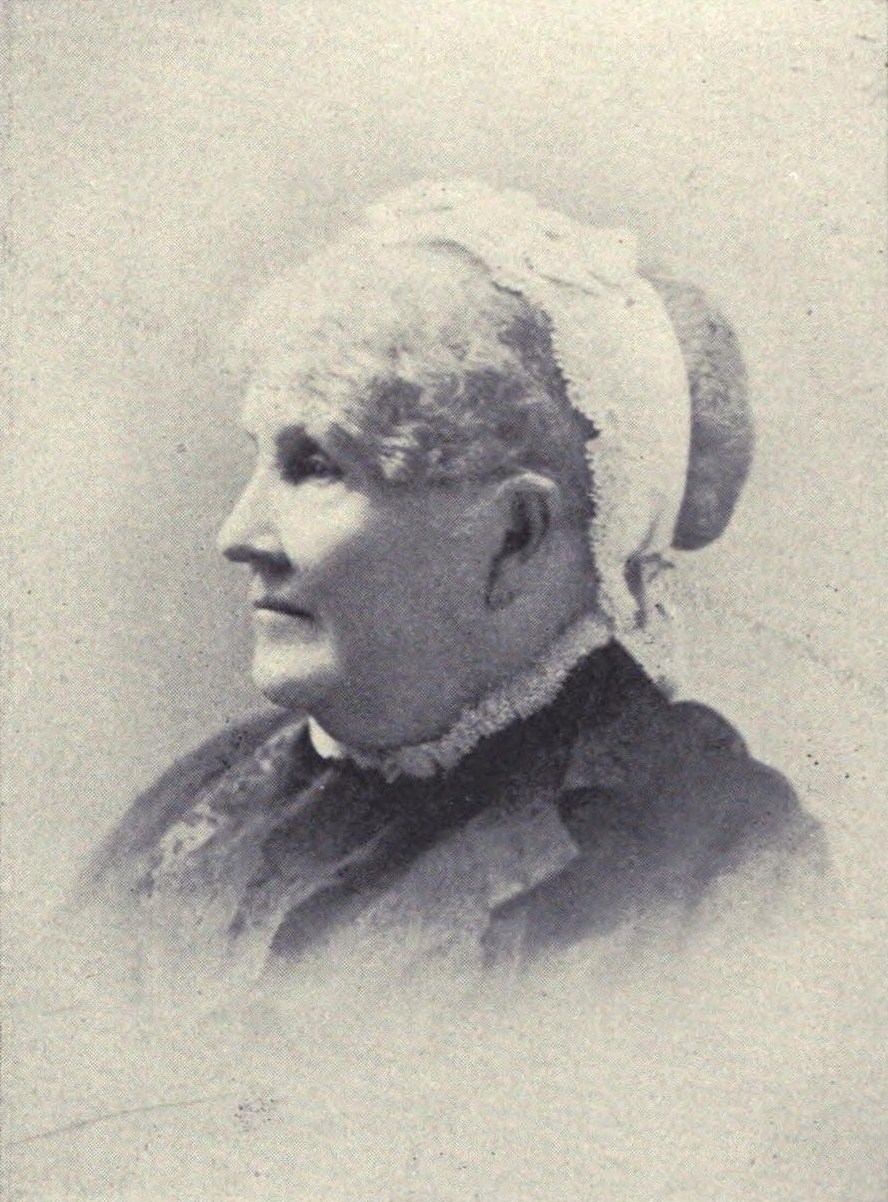
- Armstrong in 1885
- Born: May 15, 1805; Russell, Massachusetts, U.S.
- Died: July 20, 1891 (aged 86); San Francisco, California, U.S.
- Resting place: Oakland, California, U.S.
- Occupation: Missionary
- Spouse: Richard Armstrong (m. 1831; died 1860)
- Children: 10, including Samuel C. Armstrong, William Nevins Armstrong, and Ellen Armstrong Weaver
- Relatives: Reuben Atwater Chapman (brother)

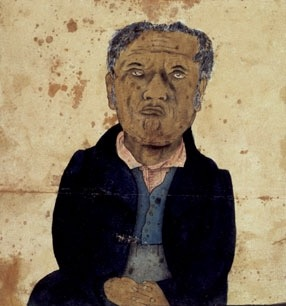
Bartimea Puaʻaiki, watercolor depiction by C. C. Armstrong

Clarissa Chapman Armstrong (May 15, 1805 – July 20, 1891) was an American missionary in the Hawaiian Islands and Marquesas Islands, from 1832 until 1847. She was part of the Fifth Company of missionaries sent to Hawaii by the American Board of Commissioners for Foreign Missions (ABCFM).

== Early life ==
Clarissa Chapman was born and raised on a farm in Russell, Massachusetts. Her father was "crippled by rheumatism" and she remembered assisting him in farm work. She trained as a teacher. Her brother was Reuben Atwater Chapman, a judge in Massachusetts.

== Mission work ==
Clarissa Chapman Armstrong sailed for Hawaii on a whaling ship in 1831, with her new husband, a Presbyterian minister. They were part of the Fifth Company of missionaries sent to Hawaii by the American Board of Commissioners for Foreign Missions (ABCFM). She was pregnant for the entire six-month journey. Her first child, Caroline, was born two months after the couple arrived, in Honolulu. The couple with Benjamin Wyman Parker and Mary Barker Parker were assigned as missionaries to Nuku Hiva in the Marquesas Islands from 1833 to 1834. Their first son was born there. The failure of the Marquesan mission prompted them to return to Hawaii. They lived at Wailuku on Maui from 1835 to 1840, and then moved to Honolulu. Armstrong taught literacy and Bible study classes for women. She did not always enjoy living among the native residents of Hawaii, writing that "Week after week passes and we see nothing but naked, filthy, wicked heathen with souls as dark as the tabernacles which they inhabit."

Armstrong also made watercolor sketches of native Marquesan and Hawaiian people and places.

Eric Kjellgren and Carol S. Ivory write, "During her time in the Marquesas, Clarissa Armstrong painted four small watercolor portraits. They show details of tattoo and personal adornment, and though somewhat naive in their rendering of the human body nevertheless capture the dignity, humanity, and individuality of their subjects." Subjects of her watercolor made in Hawaii included blind preacher Bartimea Puaʻaiki, Governor Hoapili of Maui and Queen Kalākua Kaheiheimālie.

Richard Armstrong left mission work in 1847 to take secular employment as the Minister of Public Instruction under King Kamehameha III. Clarissa Armstrong no longer taught classes, but continued to hold Bible study meetings, now with other wives of Hawaiian chiefs and government officials, including Queen Kalama. The Armstrongs lived in "the Stone House", a property of the Kingdom of Hawaii, which Clarissa kept as her residence after Richard's death in 1860. She sold the Honolulu house in 1881, and moved to San Francisco, California, to join her daughter's work at a Christian mission in that city's Chinatown.

== Personal life ==
Clarissa Chapman married Richard Armstrong on September 5, 1831, in Bridgeport, Connecticut. They had ten children. Their oldest son, William Nevins Armstrong (1835–1905) was Attorney General of the Kingdom of Hawaii from 1880 to 1882. Their youngest son, Samuel Chapman Armstrong (1839–1893) was a Union Army general during the American Civil War and afterwards the founder of the Hampton Institute. One of their daughters, Ellen Armstrong Weaver, co-founded the Daughters of Hawaii. She became a widow when Richard died in a riding accident in 1860. She died on July 20, 1891, aged 86 years, from injuries sustained in a fall, in San Francisco. Her gravesite is in Oakland, California. Her papers are archived with Samuel Chapman Armstrong's at Williams College.
