= Richard Armstrong (missionary) =

American Presbyterian missionary (1805–1860)

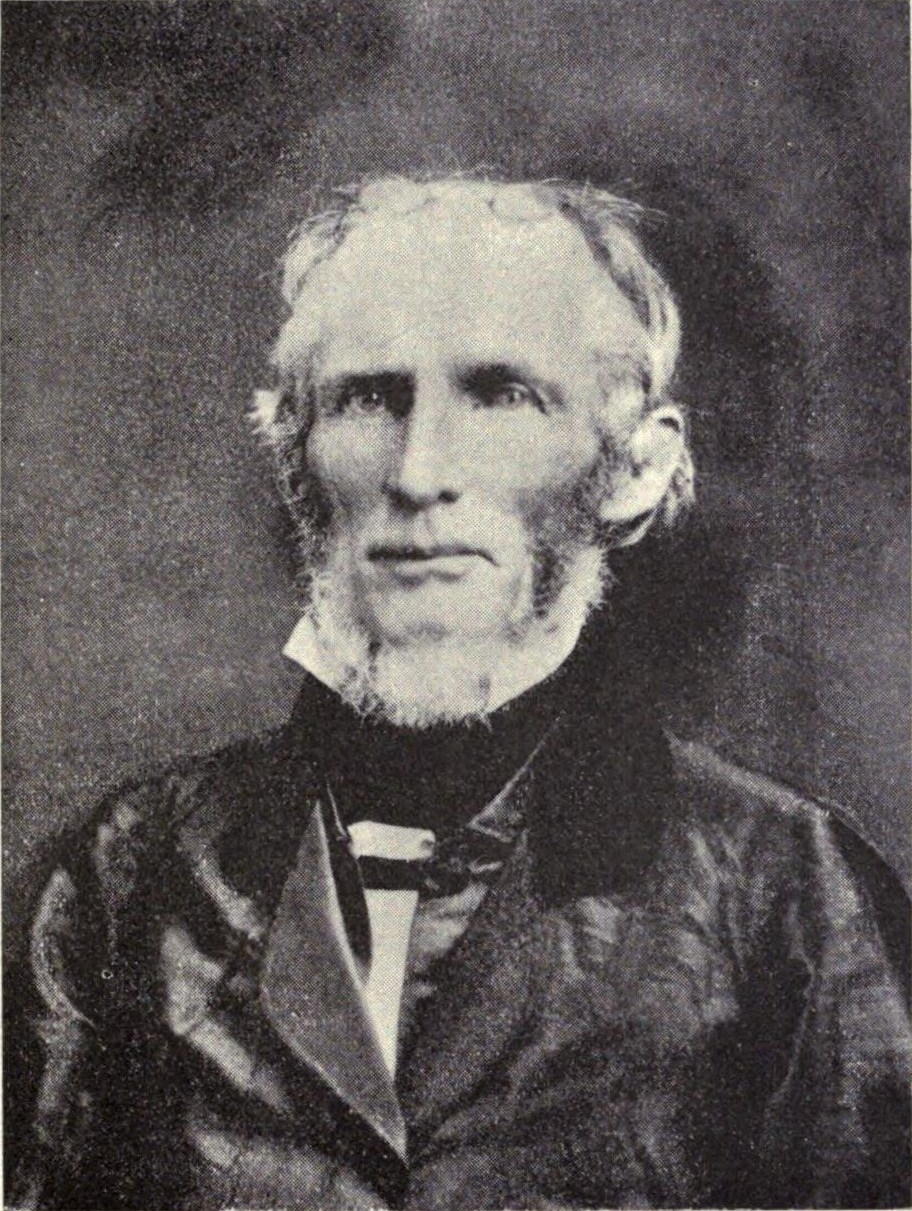
- Born: April 13, 1805; McEwensville, Pennsylvania, US
- Died: September 23, 1860 (aged 55); Honolulu, Hawaii
- Resting place: Kawaiahaʻo Church cemetery
- Education: Dickinson College; Princeton Theological Seminary
- Known for: Missionary; Educator
- Spouse: Clarissa Chapman Armstrong (1805–1891)
- Children: 10, including William Nevins, Samuel Chapman, and Ellen Armstrong Weaver

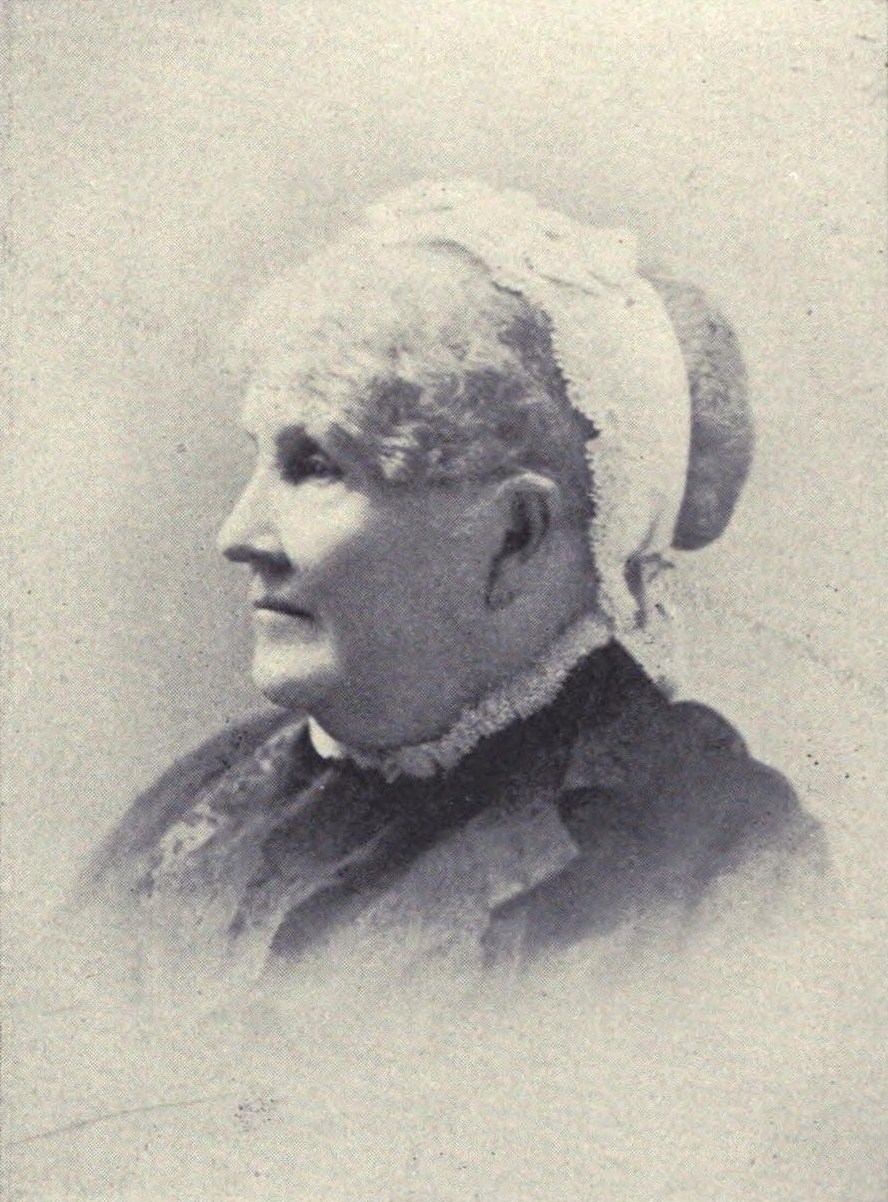
Clarissa Chapman Armstrong

Richard Armstrong (April 13, 1805 – September 23, 1860) was a Presbyterian missionary from Pennsylvania who arrived in Hawaii in 1832. With his wife, Clarissa, he served in mission fields of the Marquesas Islands and in the Kingdom of Hawaii. He established several churches and schools, and was Kahu (shepherd) of Kawaiahaʻo Church after the departure of Hiram Bingham I. Kamehameha III appointed him Minister of Public Instruction, and his accomplishments established an educational system that earned him the nickname "The father of American education in Hawaii".

== Background ==
Richard Armstrong was born in Northumberland County, Pennsylvania, on April 13, 1805, to James Armstrong and his wife, Eleanor Pollock, an American. The elder Armstrong had been born in Enniskillen, County Fermanagh, Northern Ireland, and in 1786 emigrated to the United States, where he married Eleanor. The family were Presbyterian. Richard was the youngest child of the union. He was educated at Milton Academy, in Massachusetts, and at Dickinson College, in Pennsylvania, and graduated from Princeton Theological Seminary in 1831.

== Nuku Hiva and Hawaii ==
Princeton president Archibald Alexander provided a letter of recommendation In 1831, when Armstrong made the decision to join the next contingent of missionaries being sent to Hawaii by the American Board of Commissioners for Foreign Missions. He received his ordination on October 27, and Armstrong and his new bride Clarissa Chapman departed with the other missionaries aboard the Averick on November 26. The ship docked in Honolulu on May 17, 1832, with Clarissa seven months pregnant. Daughter and first child Caroline Porter was born in Honolulu on July 17.

The board sent the Armstrongs to minister to cannibalistic tribes on Nuku Hiva in the Marquesas Islands July 2, 1833, through May 12, 1834, serving alongside two missionary couples—the Rev. William Patterson Alexander and his wife, Mary, and the Rev. Benjamin Wyman Parker and his wife, Mary Elizabeth. The first Armstrong son, William Nevins, was born on Nuku Hiva on January 2, 1834. The Nuku Hiva mission field was abandoned as futile.

The Armstrongs were reassigned to the Island of Maui, where the infant William Nevins died March 17, 1835, in Lahaina. Their second son had been born two days before, on March 15, and was given the name of his brother, William Nevins. In July of that year, the Armstrongs were assigned to Wailuku. Three more children were born during this assignment. Mary Jane was born June 2, 1836, in Honolulu. Two sons were born in Wailuku, Richard Baxter on August 15, 1837, and Samuel Chapman on January 30, 1839. During his assignment on Maui, Armstrong established churches at Waihee, Wailuku, Ulupalakua, and at Haiku, where he also became an 1858 founder of Haiku Sugar Company on land he owned.

In 1840, Armstrong was appointed Kahu (shepherd) of Kawaiahaʻo Church to replace Hiram Bingham I. On August 26, 1854, he was licensed to perform marriages in Hawaii. Armstrong officiated at the June 19, 1856, wedding of Emma Rooke and Alexander Liholiho in Kawaiahaʻo Church. Additionally, Armstrong served on the government Privy council and the House of Nobles.

=== Father of American education in Hawaii ===
Under Kamehameha III, the position of Minister of Public Instruction of the Kingdom of Hawaii was created. On April 3, 1846, William Richards was appointed to fill the new position. When Richards died in 1847, Armstrong was appointed to fill the position. Armstrong held the position until 1855, when he became President of the Board of Education. The educational model he established in the kingdom earned Armstrong the sobriquet "The father of American education in Hawaii". He created a structured environment that was financially supported by a school tax. With Armstrong at the helm, curriculum was standardized, and the responsibilities of faith-based citizenship became a part of it. The kingdom's teachers were given extended training. Land grants were implemented for additional and improved facilities, and the kingdom began issuing its own textbooks. The public school system accommodated the majority of the students, but Armstrong also chartered private educational institutions.

== Personal life and death ==
Richard Armstrong died September 23, 1860, after a riding accident, in which was punctured an artery in his neck. He was buried on the grounds of Kawaiahaʻo Church.

He married Clarissa Chapman of Russell, Massachusetts, on September 5, 1831, in Bridgeport, Connecticut. She died July 20, 1891, in San Francisco, California. They had 10 children: Caroline Porter Armstrong Beckwith, William Nevins Armstrong I, William Nevins Armstrong, Mary Jane Graham Armstrong. Richard Baxter Armstrong, Samuel Chapman Armstrong, Clarissa Hannah Armstrong Banning, Reuben Chapman Armstrong, Ellen Eliza Chapman Armstrong Weaver, and Amelia Hamilton Armstrong.
