= William Nevins Armstrong =

American lawyer

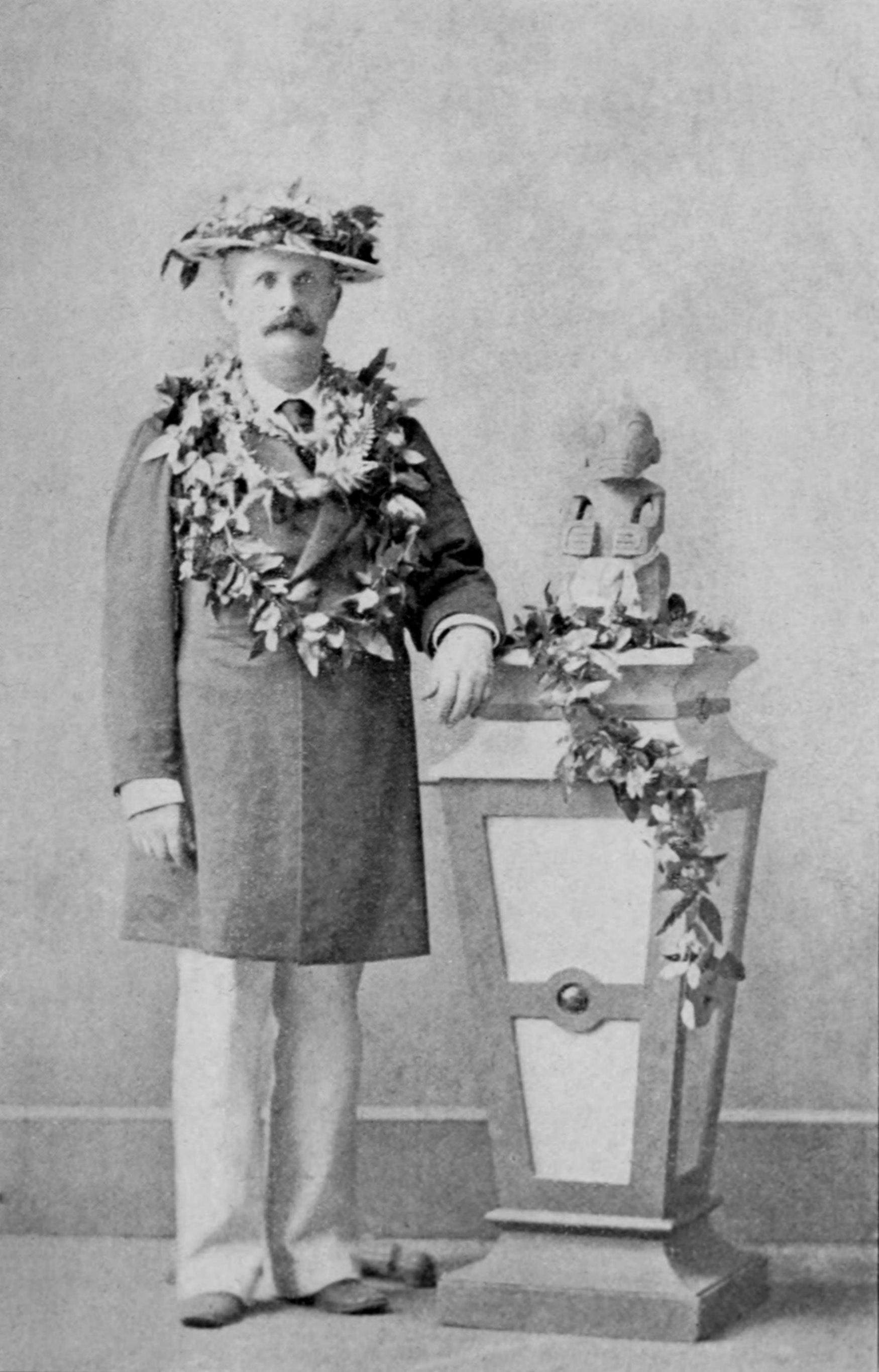

Kingdom of Hawaii Attorney General
- In office November 5, 1881 – May 19, 1882
- Monarch: Kalākaua
- Preceded by: Henry A. P. Carter
- Succeeded by: Edward Preston

Kingdom of Hawaii Attorney General
- In office November 29, 1880 – January 17, 1881
- Monarch: Kalākaua
- Preceded by: John Smith Walker
- Succeeded by: Henry A. P. Carter

Personal details
- Born: March 10, 1835 Lahaina, Maui, Kingdom of Hawaii
- Died: October 16, 1905 (aged 70) Washington, D.C.
- Resting place: Kawaiahaʻo Church

William Nevins Armstrong (March 10, 1835 – October 16, 1905), aka Nevins Armstrong and aka W. N. Armstrong, was the Attorney General of Hawaii during the reign of King David Kalākaua. He is most widely known outside of Hawaii for the book Around the World with a King, his insider account of Kalākaua's 1881 world tour.

== Early life ==
He was born in Lahaina on the island of Maui, the third of ten children of missionaries Clarissa Chapman Armstrong and Richard Armstrong, who later served as the second kahu (pastor) of Kawaiahaʻo Church, and subsequently was appointed President of the Board of Education for the Kingdom of Hawaii. William was given the name of his older brother who died in infancy. His grandfather Samuel Chapman was one of the founders of Russell, Massachusetts. Samuel C. Armstrong, his younger brother, was founder of Hampton University.

Young William was enrolled at Punahou School in Honolulu in 1842. By the age of 12, he was already looking ahead to fund his college education and was working part-time as a bookbinder. In 1849, he and schoolmate Charles Hastings Judd, as children of ministers of the cabinet of Kamehameha III, attended the Royal School. They formed a lifelong friendship with a younger schoolmate, future King of Hawaii David Kalākaua. When he was 15 years old, his mother accompanied him to the mainland United States, where he was enrolled in the university preparatory Phillips Academy at Andover, Massachusetts.

A graduate of Yale University, he studied law under the tutelage of his uncle, Massachusetts Supreme Judicial Court Chief Justice Reuben Atwater Chapman. He was admitted to the Bar in 1859 and practiced at Wheeler & Armstrong.

== King Kalākaua's world tour ==
When King Kalākaua visited New York City on his way to Washington, D.C., to negotiate the Reciprocity Treaty of 1875, Armstrong was his liaison with the city.

For the rest of his life, Armstrong lived in Hawaii for extended periods, but also spent extended periods with his family in Virginia. By 1880, he was again living in Hawaii. From November 29, 1880, to May 19, 1882, Armstrong was a member of the House of Nobles in the legislature of the Kingdom of Hawaii.

King Kalākaua appointed him Attorney General of the Kingdom of Hawaii in December 1880. Shortly thereafter, he was invited to participate in Kalākaua's 1881 world tour, an endeavor to encourage plantation labor immigration to Hawaii. Before sailing, Kalākaua appointed him Royal Commissioner of Immigration to authorize him to negotiate with foreign governments. It was his responsibility to compile a feasibility study of each country they visited, reporting back on which nations were likely to provide "a desirable population" for the Hawaiian labor force. Together with Chamberlain Colonel Charles Hastings Judd, and cook Robert von Oelhoffen, they circumnavigated the world from February 22 to October 29, visiting Asia, the Mideast and Europe. At the end, they took a railroad train trip from the east coast of the United States to California, and sailed back to Hawaii.

In Japan, both Armstrong and Judd had been awarded the Order of the Rising Sun during a ceremony in which Kalākaua was presented with the Order of the Chrysanthemum.

== Post world tour life ==
Upon their return, he resumed the position of Attorney General and held it until May 1882. Concurrently in that year, Armstrong held the positions of president of the Board of Immigration, president of the Board of Health, and Commissioner of Crown Lands. He was Chairman of the Labor Commission in 1894-1885.

In 1885 he returned to tend to the family oyster farming business in Virginia, helping organize the Oyster Convention in Hampton to convince the state legislature to allow privatization of oyster beds. He later served as a commissioner of the Massachusetts Supreme Court.

From 1897 through 1899, he was editor of the Honolulu daily newspaper The Pacific Commercial Advertiser. After returning to the mainland, he continued his reporting for the newspaper.

The detailed journal he had kept of the world trip with Kalākaua was published as Around the World with a King in 1904, the year before Armstrong died. This publication has been criticized for errors, inconsistencies and Armstrong's satirical writing style.

== Personal life ==
He wed Mary Frances Morgan on April 10, 1867. She predeceased him in 1903. The couple maintained a home in Virginia, and were the parents of a daughter Dorothy, and three sons, Matthew, Richard and Kalani.

Armstrong had been suffering from liver disease for a few years, and succumbed to catarrh at Garfield Hospital in Washington D. C. on October 15, 1905. He was cremated, and his ashes were returned to Hawaii and buried along with his parents at Kawaiahaʻo Church cemetery.
