= Ozias Johnson =

American football and basketball coach

Biographical details
- Born: August 26, 1910; Powhatan, Louisiana, U.S.
- Died: December 5, 1980 (aged 70); Grambling, Louisiana, U.S.

Coaching career (HC unless noted)

Football
- 1934–1937: Louisiana Negro

Basketball
- 1940–1942: Louisiana Negro

Head coaching record
- Overall: 0–2 (football)

Ozias Andrew Johnson Jr. (August 26, 1910 – December 5, 1980) was an American college football and college basketball coach and educator. He served head football coach at the Louisiana Negro Normal and Industrial Institute—now known as Grambling State University—in Grambling, Louisiana from 1934 to 1937. He coached the school's basketball team from 1940 to 1942.

Johnson was also the postmaster of Grambling, Louisiana while he coached at Louisiana Normal. He later coached and taught in the school system of Webster Parish, Louisiana. Johnson died on December 5, 1980, at St. Francis Medical Center in Grambling. His widow, fellow Grambling coach and professor Fidelia Adams Johnson, died in 1996.
