= Lewis Adams (activist) =

Enslaved American (1842–1905)

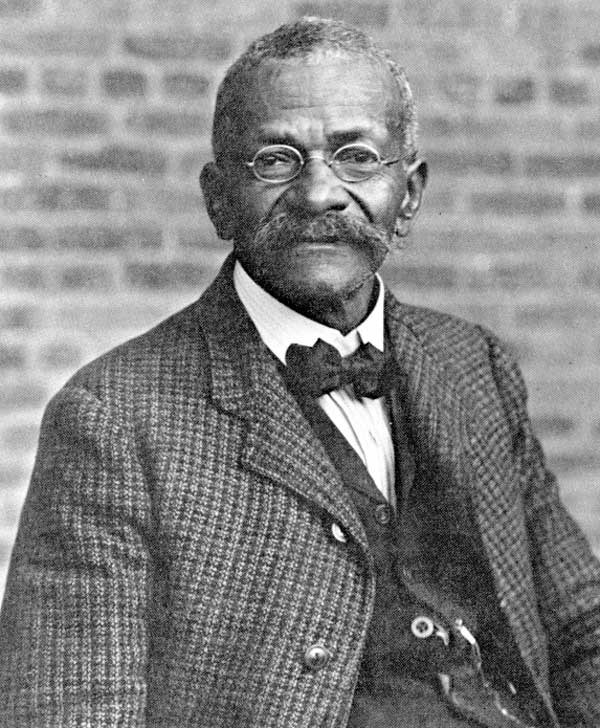
- Born: 27 October 1842; Alabama
- Died: 30 April 1905 (aged 62); Tuskegee, Alabama, United States
- Occupation: Activist

Lewis Adams (October 27, 1842 – April 30, 1905) was an African-American former slave in Macon County, Alabama, who is best remembered for his work in helping found the school in 1881 in Tuskegee, Alabama which grew to become the normal school that with its first principal, Booker T Washington, grew to become Tuskegee University.

Little is known of Adams' early life. It is known, however, that despite having no formal education, Adams could read, write, and speak several languages. He was an experienced tinsmith, harness-maker, and shoemaker. He was married to Sarah Adams, with whom he had sixteen children. He was an acknowledged leader of the county's African-American community.

Adams was especially concerned that, without an education, formerly enslaved people (and future generations) would not be able to support themselves fully. There were no institutions at that time to teach them essential skills. In partnership with a white former slave owner, Adams established a school in 1874.

In 1880, Adams was approached on behalf of two white candidates seeking election to the Alabama Senate. He was asked what it would take to get the votes of the community's black citizens. Rather than requesting or accepting personal gifts, a common practice, he made a deal with the Democratic Party in Montgomery, promising to secure the African-American vote if funding would be provided for a Normal school for African Americans at Tuskegee. He and a banker, George W Campbell, another former enslaver, skillfully convinced the Alabama Legislature to begin funding US$2,000 (~$55,769 in 2024) annually for a "Negro Normal School in Tuskegee" starting in 1881. (Normal schools were so named because they taught future teachers educational standards or norms.)

Lewis Adams then recruited and hired another formerly enslaved person, Booker T. Washington, upon recommendation of General Samuel C. Armstrong, the founder and principal of the Normal school for blacks in Hampton, Virginia, to become the first principal. From a humble beginning in a small school in a local church out-building on July 4, 1881, the school moved in 1882 to 100 acres (0.40 km^{2}) of plantation farmland, purchased with a $200 personal loan from the treasurer of Washington's former school (which eventually grew to become Hampton University).

Lewis Adams later translated Italian, French, and German for Booker T. Washington when he traveled to Europe. Lewis Adams' daughter Virginia Adams was the first graduate of Tuskegee Normal School to receive a diploma from Booker T. Washington, who led Tuskegee and, to some extent, led the nation in race relations.

Like Lewis Adams, Dr. Washington embraced the concept that formerly enslaved people needed practical job skills to support themselves and their families. Lewis Adams and Booker T. Washington had an uncle/nephew relationship, with Adams guiding Washington throughout the Tuskegee community. Adams and his family helped Washington galvanize support among the African-Americans in the Tuskegee community to support the growing school. Adams and Washington built the school into a self-contained, self-reliant community. Lewis Adams died in 1905.

In addition to building the school in Tuskegee, Washington became a famous orator. He secured significant funding from wealthy American philanthropists such as Andrew Carnegie, Collis P. Huntington, John D. Rockefeller, and Henry Huttleston Rogers. Despite his travels and widespread work, Dr. Washington remained the principal of Tuskegee until he died in 1915 at the age of 59. At the time of his death, Tuskegee's endowment exceeded US$1.5 million.

Another famous African American who taught at the school of Lewis Adams' dreams was Dr. George Washington Carver.
