= Warrenton Junction Raid =

Cavalry skirmish in Virginia during the American Civil War

Coordinates: 38°38′02″N 77°40′13″W

- Part of the American Civil War
- Fauquier County in Virginia
Date	May 3, 1863
Location	East of Warrenton, Virginia
Result	Union victory

Belligerents
United States (Union)	(Confederate States of America) CSA (Confederacy)

Commanders and leaders
Maj. Josiah Steele 1WVA; Maj. John Hammond 5NY	Maj. John S. Mosby

Units involved
1st WV Cavalry (det.); 5th NY Cavalry (det.)	Mosby's Rangers

Strength
1WVA 100, 5NY 40+	70-125

Casualties and losses
~19	~30
- Mosby surprised 1st (West) Virginia, then 5th New York surprised Mosby

The Warrenton Junction Raid (May 3, 1863) was a surprise attack by Confederate guerrilla warriors on a Union cavalry detachment during the American Civil War. The raid took place near a railroad junction in Virginia's Fauquier County, less than 10 miles (16 km) from the town of Warrenton. Confederate Major (eventually Colonel) John S. Mosby led the attack against about 100 men from the Union's 1st (West) Virginia Cavalry. At first, the raid was very successful, as many of the Union soldiers surrendered to the rebels. The remaining portion of the surprised force was surrounded in a house, and two of their leaders were wounded. The house was set on fire, and the Union soldiers surrendered. As Mosby's men rounded up prisoners and horses, a detachment of the 5th New York Cavalry surprised the rebels and rescued most of the captured Union soldiers. After a short fight, more men from the 5th New York, and the 1st Vermont Cavalry, joined in the pursuit of Mosby's fleeing rebels.

Casualties for the detachment of the 1st (West) Virginia Cavalry, the unit surprised by Mosby, totaled 16 men. Although Mosby was forced to release most of his prisoners while escaping from the 5th New York Cavalry, he still managed to keep at least two West Virginians in captivity. Mosby lost 1 killed and at least 30 taken prisoner—many of whom were wounded. The 5th New York Cavalry had three men wounded.

The two sides involved in this minor fight became very skilled in warfare—but were still learning those skills at that time. The Union's 1st Virginia Cavalry, renamed 1st West Virginia Volunteer Cavalry Regiment two months later, became one of West Virginia's most effective regiments and had 14 Medal of Honor recipients. It fought at the Battle of Gettysburg, had an important role in eliminating the Confederate Army of the Valley, and was present at General Robert E. Lee's surrender of his Army of Northern Virginia. The Confederacy's Mosby's Rangers suffered their first defeat, but became masters of guerrilla warfare and were a constant concern for Union armies in eastern Virginia.

== Background ==
By May 1863, the American Civil War was in its third year. The war began when southern states, including Virginia, seceded from the United States and formed a new nation called the Confederate States of America. The federal government of the United States did not accept the secession and fought to end the rebellion. The people of the state of Virginia were especially divided, as many in the western portion of the state preferred to remain as part of the United States instead of joining the Confederacy.

=== Fauquier County ===
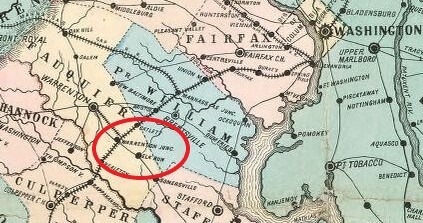
Fauquier County and Warrenton Junction

Fauquier County, Virginia, is located slightly less than 50 miles (80 km) west of Washington, DC, and slightly less than 100 miles (160 km) northwest of Richmond, Virginia, which was the capital of the Confederate States of America. The county's population in 1860 was 21,763, and about half of its people were slaves. (Note: The United States Census of 1860, for Fauquier County, Virginia, lists a population of 21,763 people (including 10,455 slaves) on page 516.) Because of the county's location and the presence of a railroad, troops for both sides in the American Civil War were often nearby. Some of the battles that occurred in the county were: the Battle of Thoroughfare Gap, the First Battle of Rappahannock Station, the Second Battle of Rappahannock Station, the First Battle of Auburn, and the Second Battle of Auburn.

The Orange and Alexandria Railroad, which ran through the county, had strategic significance because it was part of the only rail link between Washington and Richmond. It was also part of rail connections to the Shenandoah Valley, Charlottesville, Lynchburg, and into Tennessee. From Lynchburg, the Virginia and Tennessee Railroad connections accessed lead mines near Wytheville, Virginia, and the lead provided raw material for the bullets of the Confederate Army.

The town of Warrenton has always been the county seat of Fauquier County. Its first courthouse was built in 1790, and its population as of 1860 was 604. The Warrenton Branch line, which was 8.9 miles (14.3 km) long, connected the town of Warrenton to the main line of the Orange and Alexandria Railroad at Warrenton Junction. This branch line, which was completed by the 1850s, helped the town thrive as farmers brought crops and livestock for sale and distribution. The town was the home of William "Extra Billy" Smith, who was twice elected governor of Virginia. The town was also the home of the elite Black Horse Cavalry, which was founded before the war. The Black Horse Cavalry was eventually incorporated into the 4th Virginia Cavalry of the Confederate Army.

=== Mosby's Rangers ===
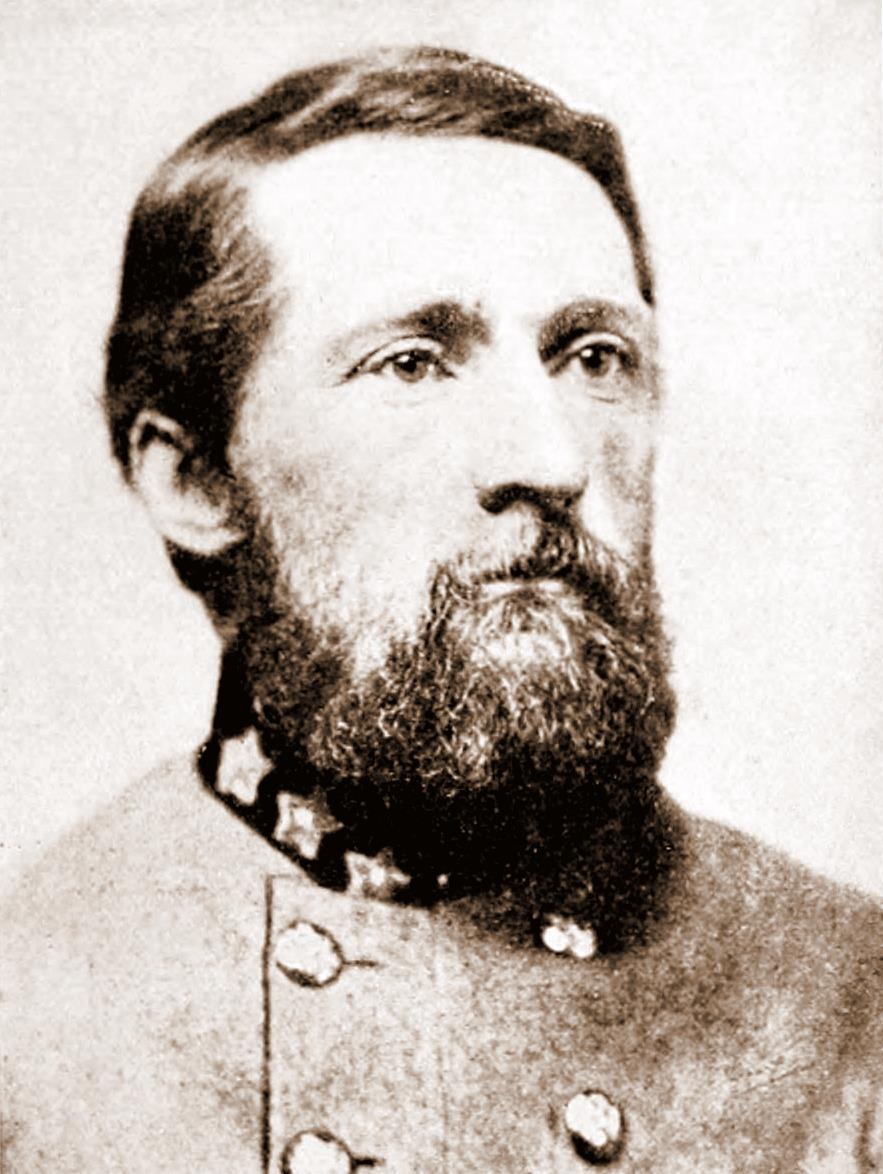
John Mosby

In early 1863, Confederate generals Robert E. Lee and James Ewell Brown "Jeb" Stuart gave permission for John Singleton Mosby to lead a group of 15 partisan rangers that would operate within enemy lines in northern Virginia. Mosby had been one of Stuart's best scouts, and his new cavalry unit became known as Mosby's Rangers. Mosby said that the purpose of his unit was not to win major battles, but to "compel the enemy either greatly to contract his lines or to reinforce them; either of which would be of great advantage to the Southern cause." This goal was accomplished through "incessant attacks", at night or day, when his enemy was not prepared for conflict.

As partisan rangers, Mosby's Rangers made quick strikes, and then disappeared. Mosby patterned his technique after General Francis Marion, a leader in the American Revolutionary War who learned his fighting style from the Cherokee Indians. Mosby's Rangers had no camp, and typically scattered among local farmhouses—especially in Fauquier and Loudoun Counties. Mosby's weapon of choice was the Colt 6-shot revolver. Each of his men usually had two or more revolvers, and no shooting was done until the target was within the 30 foot (9.1 m) range of the weapon. Mosby disdained sabers, and the Union cavalry standard procedure of getting close enough to use their sabers helped his men get their enemy within the range of their revolvers.

Mosby was a small-town Virginian before the war. His Mosby's Rangers operated primarily in a region surrounding Warrenton that included Clarke, Fauquier, Loudoun, Prince William, and Warren counties. Although Mosby's Rangers had existed for less than half a year, Mosby had already conducted successful raids including the capture of General Edwin H. Stoughton. After his raid in Fairfax that captured Stoughton (who had been asleep), Mosby became one of the most famous soldiers in America. Eventually Mosby's Rangers grew and became the 43rd Battalion, Virginia Cavalry. By the end of the war, Mosby's Rangers was one of the most renowned military units. The counties where Mosby's Rangers typically conducted operations became known as Mosby's Confederacy.

On May 2, Mosby assembled a group of 70 to 100 men for the purpose of attacking the supply wagons of Union General Joseph Hooker's army. (Note: Mosby wrote in his book that he had 70 or 80 men, and planned to attack Hooker's supply wagons. Other sources say the number of men in Mosby's command was around 100. Author Connery says "he and 100 men". Author Williamson says "Mosby, with 98 men". Union General Julius Stahel described the Confederate force as Mosby's guerrillas with the "Black Horse Cavalry and a portion of a North Carolina regiment". Union Brigadier General John J. Abercrombie reported that Mosby's force numbered "about 125".) They spent the night in Warrenton, and were on the road to Fredericksburg at dawn. Their plan was to attack Hooker's wagon train as it crossed the Rappahannock River, and the probable crossing point was about 20 miles (32 km) away. They were near Warrenton Junction between 8:00 and 9:00 am when they accidentally discovered the 1st (West) Virginia Cavalry.

=== 1st (West) Virginia Cavalry ===
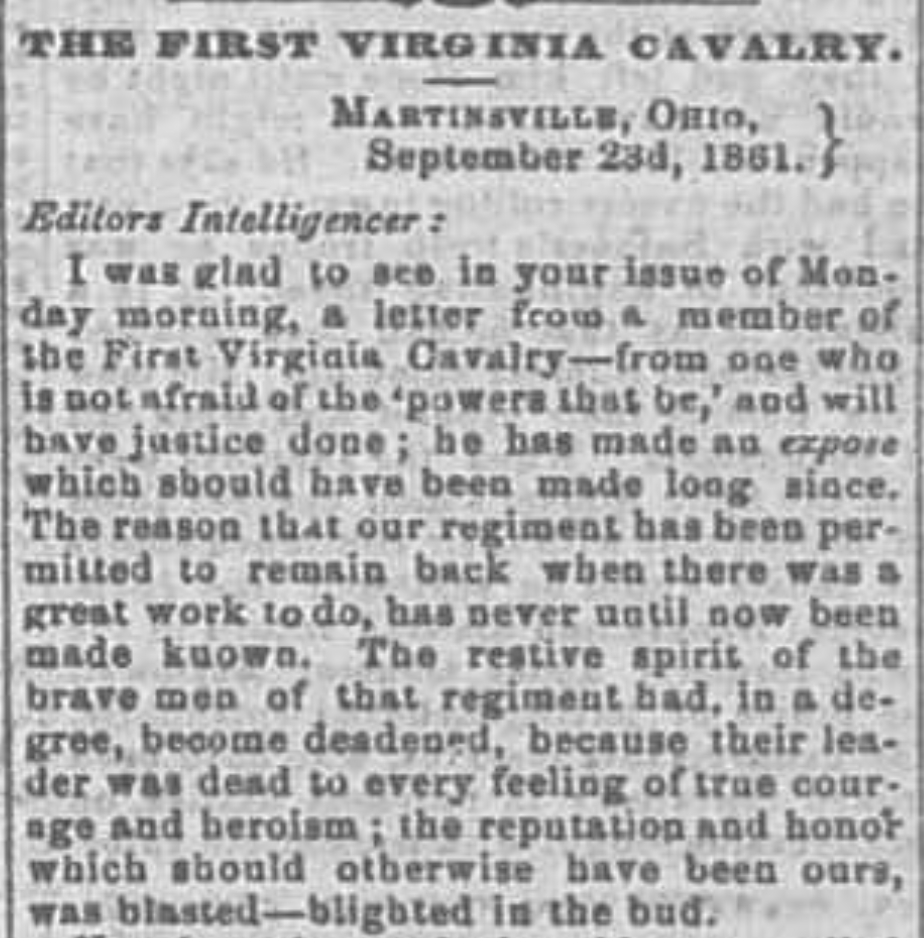
Low morale for 1VA Cavalry

In May 1863, two 1st Virginia Cavalries existed. One 1st Virginia Cavalry sided with the rebellion and fought for the Confederate States of America. Another 1st Virginia Cavalry preferred that the states remain in a union, and was therefore loyal to the Federal government of the United States. The 1st Virginia Cavalry that was loyal to the union was often noted with "union" or "loyal" near its name, and later with "West". On June 20, the new state of West Virginia consisting of northwestern counties of Virginia joined the union, and the loyal 1st Virginia Cavalry became the 1st West Virginia Cavalry—although many still called it the 1st Virginia.

The 1st West Virginia Cavalry was "the most active, and one of the most effective", West Virginia regiments by the end of the American Civil War. It had 14 Medal of Honor winners, the most of any West Virginia regiment. However, it took years for it to become an effective military unit. One Ohio soldier, writing about some fighting that occurred in early 1862, said that the 1st (West) Virginia Cavalry's original regiment commander "was one of the foreign adventurers who so largely officered our army at its beginning and were absolutely useless for any purpose except to draw their pay and to wear gold braid." Later in 1862, a report by Union General James Shields, sent to Secretary of War Edwin M. Stanton, said "First Virginia Cavalry good for nothing."

The 1st (West) Virginia's first two commanders were court-martialed, and during May 1863 it had no permanent commander. (Note: During 1862, General Frederick Lander brought court martial charges against the 1st (West) Virginia Cavalry's Colonel Henry Anisansel for "failing to obey an order to charge the enemy" at Bloomery Gap. Anisansel was exonerated because he claimed a battle injury made him unable to make the charge. After returning to duty, he resigned on August 6, 1862. He was succeeded by his second-in-command, Lieutenant Colonel Nathaniel P. Richmond. During December 1862, Richmond became involved in a dispute that resulted in his arrest for disobedience. Richmond remained under arrest until he resigned on March 18, 1863. However, Richmond was popular with his fellow officers. At least one soldier credited Richmond for changing the reputation of the regiment from bad to good. Historian Eric Wittenberg described Richmond as a "fine soldier who did his duty and did it well." Richmond was eventually reinstated as regiment commander, and had temporary command of a brigade during the Battle of Gettysburg.) The regiment was under the temporary command of Lieutenant Colonel John S. Krepps according to a May 5 after action report of Brigadier General John J. Abercrombie, but a report by the regiment's Major Benjamin F. Chamberlain lists himself as commanding. Neither is mentioned in the three Union after action reports as being present when the May 3 attack on a detachment of the regiment occurred. Major Josiah Steele is the regiment's highest-ranking officer discussed in the reports, and also Mosby mentions "commanding officer, Maj. Steel" in his memoirs. (Note: Scott's compilation of war records contains the after action reports. Mosby spells Major Steele as "Maj. Steel" in his memoirs.)

On May 3, 1863, the detachment was less than 60 miles (97 km) west of Washington, DC, near the junction of the Orange and Alexandria and Manassas Gap railroads. This junction was called Warrenton Junction, and it is about 10 miles (16 km) east of the town of Warrenton. A detachment of about 100 men finished their mission for the day, although it was still early in the morning (around 9:00 am). Their horses were unsaddled and feeding, and few precautions had been taken for the Union force's security. Based on a newspaper article, the detachment included men from Companies C, F, G, and L. The report of General Stahel mentions two captains from the 1st (West Virginia) Cavalry: William Harris, who led Company C; and William McCoy, who led Company F.

== Attack ==
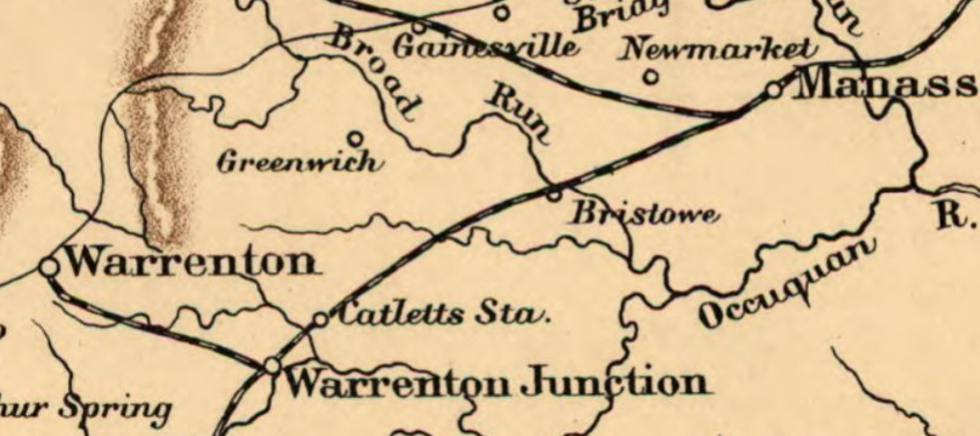
Warrenton Junction area, west of Washington, DC

As Mosby's men left the woods close to Warrenton Junction, they saw the 1st (West) Virginia Cavalry about 300 yards (270 m) away in an open field. When Mosby's men approached, the Union soldiers believed they were friendlies from the 1st Vermont Cavalry. Mosby ordered a charge, and his men "raised a yell".

The surprised men from the 1st (West) Virginia Cavalry ran for their weapons and sought cover in three nearby buildings. A small stream slowed Mosby enough that all but about 20 of the surprised soldiers could get behind cover. Most of the 20 men that were too far from buildings were quickly captured. The cavalry's Major Josiah Steele, seeing that it was impossible to saddle the horses in time to meet the attack, cut the horses loose to prevent them from being captured. The men who sought cover in the two smallest buildings soon found that they had little protection, and quickly surrendered. Many of the Union soldiers took cover in the largest building, which was located near the railroad tracks.

Mosby's men used their revolvers to attack the overcrowded building, and both sides fought fiercely. The fighting continued for about half an hour. Steele and Captain William A. McCoy of Company C initially refused Mosby's demand that they surrender. A few of Mosby's men entered the first floor of the building. Steele and McCoy were wounded, as were many of the men on the first floor. Although the men in the first floor surrendered, the men on the second floor continued the fight, so Mosby had his men set the structure on fire. This caused the remaining members of the 1st (West) Virginia Cavalry to surrender. Those that could leave the smoke-filled house exited through a first floor that was covered with blood. The Rangers collected prisoners and equipment, and then began to retrieve horses. (Note: Mosby wrote that he "had taken three times my own number prisoners, together with all their horses, arms and equipments." One author claims Mosby captured 300 soldiers. These claims disagree with the Union reports that mention 50 to 100 men.)

=== Rescue ===
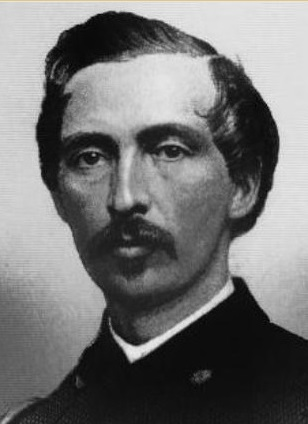
Maj. Hammond

When Mosby's men attacked, many of the Union horses set loose by Major Steele stampeded toward the camp of a 70-man detachment of the 5th New York Cavalry, which caused some of the New Yorkers' horses to also run off. About 40 of the New Yorkers, led by Major John Hammond, quickly rode to the rescue of the West Virginians—arriving right after Mosby collected prisoners from the burning house.

When Hammond arrived, many of the Rangers were trying to collect horses and discarded weapons. Mosby had about 40 prisoners that he was about to take back to Warrenton. This time, it was Mosby who was unprepared. His Rangers were scattered and he had not designated a second-in-command. He did not see the New Yorkers until they were about 250 yards (230 m) away. Unable to rally his troops, he was forced to give up much of what he captured while his men fled in every direction.

The fight became a running battle with Union cavalry pursuing Mosby's Rangers. The 5th New York's Captain Abram H. Krom was shot twice (face and leg) and his horse killed—yet Krom survived, and continued fighting with his saber. Mosby suffered significant losses, including some of his more-skilled men and 40 horses. Some Rangers escaped by crawling to safety or hiding. The 1st Vermont Cavalry arrived after the initial fighting and joined the pursuit of Mosby's men. More men from the 5th New York Cavalry joined the pursuit after they retrieved their horses. Newspaper reports later believed Mosby was wounded, and his best officer and best spy were among the casualties.

=== Casualties ===
Casualties for the Union totaled to 19. The 1st (West) Virginia had 2 killed and 14 wounded, including 2 officers. One of the officers (Steele) was mortally wounded. The 5th New York Cavalry had 3 wounded, including two officers. (Note: Casualty figures used herein for the 1st (West) Virginia Cavalry are from the May 3 report of Major Benjamin F. Chamberlain of the 1st (West) Virginia Cavalry. Casualties for the 5th New York match Chamberlain's report and a history of the regiment written by the 5th New York's chaplain. One author says casualties for the 1st (West) Virginia totaled to 17, and for the 5th New York totaled to at least 4 including 1 mortally wounded.) Mosby was still able to keep 2 prisoners from the 1st (West) Virginia. (Note: The Union prisoner count varies by source. The May 4 report of General J.J. Abercrombie says all prisoners were recovered except 2. Williamson says "Mosby brought out 7 prisoners and a few horses. Pyott says Mosby kept 8 prisoners. Mosby wrote "My men fled in every direction, taking off about 50 horses and a number of prisoners.)

Mosby had over 30 of his men, including several officers, taken prisoner and at least one killed. It was also believed that some of Mosby's wounded and killed were hidden by locals. About 40 horses were also captured. About 16 of the prisoners were severely wounded. (Note: Casualty figures used herein for Mosby are from the May 5 report of General Julius Stahal. Mosby wrote that he lost 1 killed and about 20 captured, and most of those captured were wounded. Black says Mosby had 1 killed and 23 taken prisoner, and 16 of the prisoners were wounded. One of Mosby's men believed about one-fourth of the Rangers were taken prisoner, one was killed, and 3 were mortally wounded.) "Templeton, the notorious spy," (actually Madison Templeman) was killed. (Note: Stahel's report was dated May 5 and mentions "Templeton". "Templeton" was actually Madison Templeman—a spy from Texas often misidentified by northerners.) Although one general's report, and a newspaper account, claimed Mosby was wounded, that was not true.

== Aftermath ==
At least one source believes that Union leaders hid the incompetency of the 1st (West) Virginia Cavalry, writing that in "an effort to excuse lax security, they later reported that the front rank of Rangers were dressed in Union uniforms." Union General J.J. Abercrombie's report that said Mosby's "front rank was dressed in the uniform of United States soldiers". A newspaper article also stated that Mosby's men were mistaken for the 1st Vermont Cavalry. Mosby agrees that his men were mistaken for Union cavalry, but wrote that his men were all dressed in the gray of the Confederate Army. Union Sergeant Edwin Havens described Mosby's men that were captured as having "no regularity of uniforms being clad in everything they could find"—and had no mention of the blue uniforms worn by United States soldiers. Lt. Colonel Krepps was not mentioned in after action reports by Stahel, Abercrombie, or Chamberlain.

=== Better cavalry ===
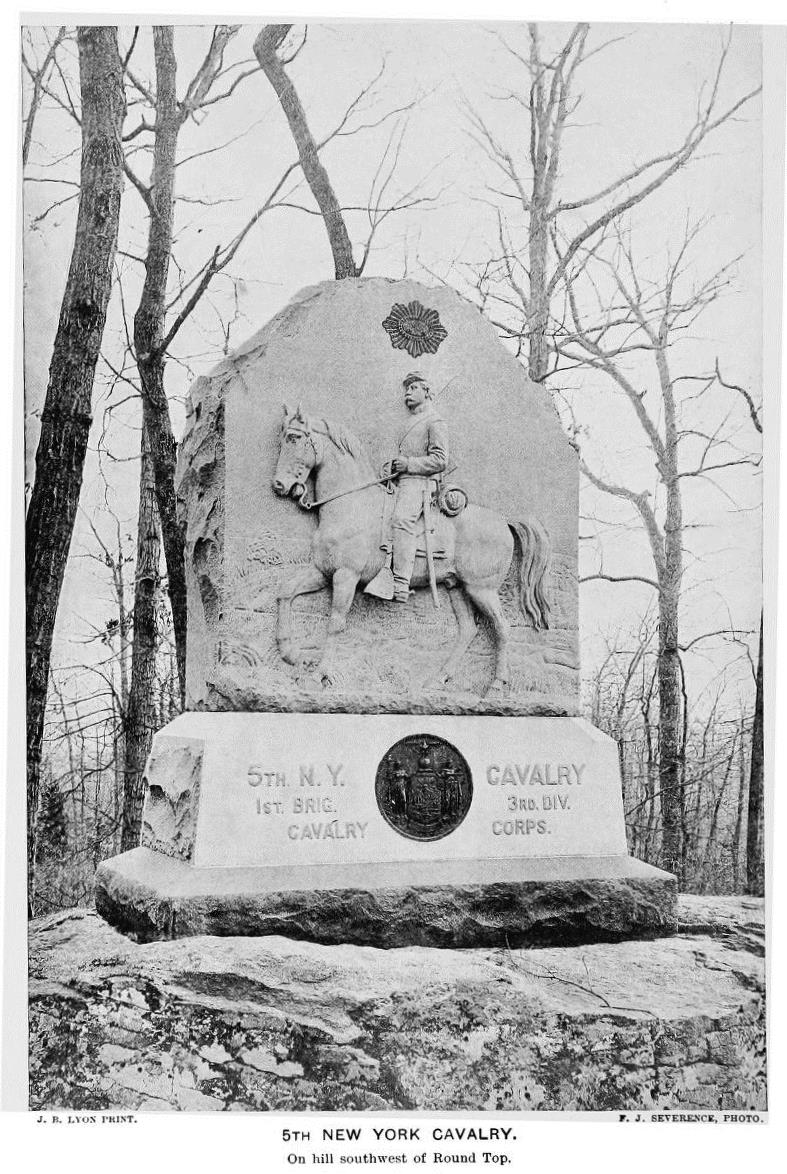
Gettysburg Memorial

The 1st (West) Virginia Cavalry soon had better leaders and better arms. During the spring after the Mosby encounter, the 1st (West) Virginia Cavalry Regiment became armed with Spencer repeating rifles. Krepps resigned from the 1st (West) Virginia Cavalry on May 22 for medical reasons. Officers from the regiment sent a petition to Secretary of War Stanton to have their well-thought-of second permanent commander, Lieutenant Colonel Nathaniel P. Richmond, reinstated. Richmond was reinstated as regimental commander on June 12. Later in June, after the new state of West Virginia joined the Union, the 1st (West) Virginia Cavalry became known as the 1st West Virginia Cavalry.

All three Union cavalry regiments involved in the Warrenton Junction Raid (5th New York, 1st Vermont, 1st West Virginia) fought at the Battle of Gettysburg as part of the same brigade. Richmond proved to be a good leader, and assumed temporary command of the brigade at Gettysburg after the commander was killed. He led the brigade for part of the pursuit after the battle. During that pursuit, the 1st West Virginia Cavalry charged down a mountain and captured a Confederate artillery piece and an entire wagon train.

In 1865, the 1st West Virginia Cavalry was in the Third Brigade of the Third Division of General Philip Sheridan's Army of the Shenandoah. This army eliminated General Jubal Early's Army of the Valley at the Battle of Waynesboro, Virginia when the Third Brigade charged and cut off over half of Early's force—which forced that portion of the rebels to surrender. The regiment also prepared for battle but did not fight in the Battle of Appomattox Court House, as General Robert E. Lee's Army of Northern Virginia surrendered.

In his memoirs, Mosby noted that Major Hammond was wise to attack immediately at Warrenton Junction, not waiting for the rest of his command, which enabled the 5th New York Cavalry to catch Mosby "in disorder and scattered". Hammond assumed command of the 5th New York Cavalry on June 1, 1863. He had an important role in the Battle of Hanover when the brigade was traveling to Gettysburg. His regiment's historian said he was known for his "coolness and bravery", and considered him a great equestrian and leader. In 1864, the New York Herald said that Colonel Hammond was "one of the best officers in the service." Hammond was not the only officer in the Warrenton Junction Raid that would eventually command a regiment. Abram Krom, a captain in the 5th New York Cavalry, became a major and briefly commanded the regiment in 1864 after Hammond left.

=== Mosby learned ===
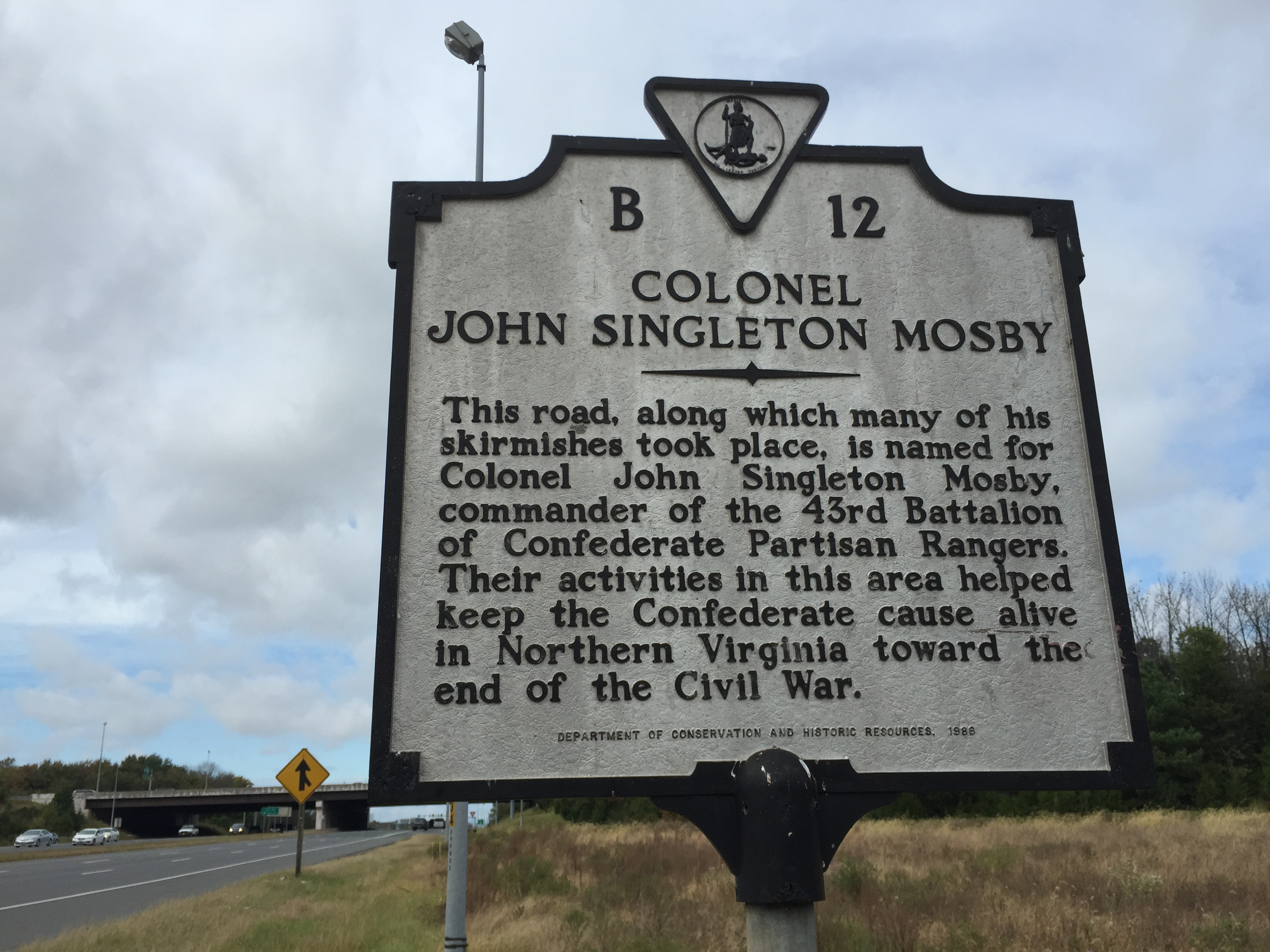
Mosby historical marker in Virginia

Mosby normally scouted, gathered intelligence, and planned thoroughly. At Warrenton Junction, he was distracted by an unexpected opportunity. He later wrote "When I ordered the charge at Warrenton Junction, I had no idea whether I was attacking a hundred or a thousand men." Not only was this reckless, it also prevented Mosby from accomplishing his goal of attacking Hooker's supply wagons. He also wrote "...it was a mistake my making this fight, even if I had been completely successful."

Mosby also learned that working with 100 men was different than working with 15. His men were from various units, and had "none of the cohesion and discipline that springs from organization". Since he had designated no unit commanders or even a second-in-command, it became difficult to rally his men when they were scattered about. During the fight, he also neglected to establish a security detail (pickets) surrounding the area of the fighting, which resulted in his surprise by the 5th New York Cavalry.

Mosby learned from his mistakes, and Mosby's Rangers became a constant concern for Union commanders in Virginia. General Ulysses S. Grant narrowly escaped capture by Mosby's men, and decided to avoid traveling to Washington from his headquarters with the Army of the Potomac. During September and the first half of November 1864, Mosby claimed to have captured "not less than seven hundred prisoners". Two of Sheridan's division commanders, General George Custer and General William H. Powell, became especially frustrated with Mosby. Retaliations and injustices occurred (depending on one's point of view), and Powell threatened to execute 22 prisoners for every one of his men he considered murdered by outlawed guerrillas. (Note: Powell had been part of the 2nd West Virginia Cavalry, which operated in the southern part of what is now West Virginia early in the war. Bushwhackers were a big problem for the Union forces, and they thought of a bushwhacker as an "unprincipled scoundrel who was too cowardly to join the army and fight as a man…". Powell believed Mosby's men were "illegal and outlawed", and executed three of them who he believed murdered two of his men—threatening to execute more.) After receiving a letter from Mosby, Sheridan agreed to a truce in the brutality committed by both sides against prisoners. Although more attempts were made to eliminate Mosby's Rangers, the Rangers were active until the end of the war. After the war was over, Mosby became a Republican and worked several jobs for the U.S. government. He died in 1916 and is buried in Warrenton.

== Notes ==
=== References ===
- Black, Robert C. (1952). The Railroads of the Confederacy. Chapel Hill: University of North Carolina Press. ISBN 978-0-80784-729-9. OCLC 1001503210.
- Black, Robert W. (2008). Ghost, Thunderbolt, and Wizard: Mosby, Morgan, and Forrest in the Civil War. Mechanicsburg, PA: Stackpole Books. OCLC 681219923.
- Boudrye, Louis N. (1865). Historic Records of the Fifth New York Cavalry, First Ira Harris Guard, Its Organization, Marches, Raids, scouts, Engagements, and General Services During the Rebellion of 1861-1865...Illustrated with Steel Portraits and Wood Cuts. Albany, NY: S. R. Gray. OCLC 558081147.
- Chernow, Ron (2017). Grant. New York: Penguin Press. ISBN 978-0-52552-195-2. OCLC 989726874.
- Connery, William S. (2013). Mosby's Raids in Civil War Northern Virginia. Charleston, SC: The History Press. ISBN 978-1-61423-877-5. OCLC 1051054591.
- Curry, W. L. (1898). Four Years in the Saddle - History of the First Regiment Ohio Volunteer Cavalry – War of the Rebellion 1861–1865. Columbus, Ohio: Champlin Printing Co.
- Hunt, Roger D. (2014). Colonels in Blue : Indiana, Kentucky and Tennessee : a Civil War Biographical Dictionary. Jefferson, North Carolina: McFarland & Company, Inc. ISBN 978-1-47661-386-4. OCLC 863157239.
- Hunter, Alexander (1904). Johny Reb and Billy Yank. New York: Konecky & Konecky. ISBN 978-1-56852-080-3. OCLC 36452398.
- Lang, Joseph J. (1895). Loyal West Virginia from 1861 to 1865 : With an Introductory Chapter on the Status of Virginia for Thirty Years Prior to the War. Baltimore, MD: Deutsch Publishing Co. OCLC 779093.
- Mosby, John S. (1887). Mosby's War Reminiscences, and Stuart's Cavalry Campaigns. New York: Dodd, Mead & Company. OCLC 11269959.
- O'Neill, Robert F. (2012). Chasing Jeb Stuart and John Mosby: the Union Cavalry in Northern Virginia from Second Manassas to Gettysburg. Jefferson, North Carolina: McFarland & Co. ISBN 978-0-78649-256-5. OCLC 794664336.
- Pyott, Michael D. (2014). Gray Ghost And His Featherbed Guerrillas : a Leadership Analysis Of John S. Mosby and the 43rd Virginia Cavalry. [Not listed]: Pickle Partners Publishing. ISBN 978-1-78289-497-1. OCLC 923348789.
- Scott, Robert N. (1885). The War of the Rebellion: a Compilation of the Official Records of the Union and Confederate Armies Series I Volume XII Part III. Washington, DC: Government Printing Office. OCLC 191710879.
- Scott, Robert N. (1889). The War of the Rebellion: a Compilation of the Official Records of the Union and Confederate Armies Series I Volume XXV Part I. Washington, DC: Government Printing Office. OCLC 191710879.
- Sutton, Joseph J. (2001) [1892]. History of the Second Regiment, West Virginia Cavalry Volunteers, During the War of the Rebellion. Huntington, WV: Blue Acorn Press. ISBN 978-0-9628866-5-2. OCLC 263148491.
- United States Congress (1895). "The Miscellaneous Documents of the House of Representatives for the Second Session of the Fifty-Third Congress 1893-'94". The War of the Rebellion: A Compilation of the Official Records of the Union and Confederate Armies Series I Volume XLIII Part I. U.S. Government Printing Office. OCLC 27268551.
- Wert, Jeffry D. (1990). Mosby's Rangers. New York: Simon & Schuster. ISBN 978-0-671-74745-9.
- Williamson, James J. (1909). Mosby's Rangers, a Record of the Operations of the Forty-third Battalion of Virginia Cavalry from its Organization to the Surrender. New York: Sturgis & Walton. p. 554. OCLC 1577261.
- Wittenberg, Eric J.; Petruzzi, J. David; Nugent, Michael F. (2008). One Continuous Fight: the Retreat from Gettysburg and the Pursuit of Lee's Army of Northern Virginia, July 4–14, 1863. New York: Savas Beatie. ISBN 978-1-9327144-3-2. OCLC 185031178.
