= 9th United States Colored Infantry Regiment =

Military unit on the Union side during the American Civil War

9th United States Colored Infantry
- Active: November 11, 1863, to November 20, 1866
- Country: United States
- Allegiance: Union
- Branch: Infantry
- Engagements: Siege of Petersburg; Battle of Chaffin's Farm; Second Battle of Deep Bottom; Battle of Darbytown Road; Battle of Fair Oaks & Darbytown Road; Appomattox Campaign

The 9th United States Colored Infantry was an infantry regiment that served in the Union Army during the American Civil War. The regiment was composed of African American enlisted men commanded by white officers and was authorized by the Bureau of Colored Troops which was created by the United States War Department on May 22, 1863.

== Service ==
The 9th U.S. Colored Infantry was organized at Camp Stanton in Benedict, Maryland, beginning November 11, 1863.

The regiment was attached to District of Hilton Head, South Carolina, Department of the South, to April 1864. District of Beaufort, South Carolina, Department of the South, to August 1864. 1st Brigade, 3rd Division, X Corps, Army of the James, Department of Virginia and North Carolina, to December 1864. 2nd Brigade, 3rd Division, XXV Corps, to January 1865. 2nd Brigade, 1st Division, XXV Corps, to January 1866. Department of Texas to November 1866.

The 9th U.S. Colored Infantry mustered out of service November 20, 1866.

== Detailed service ==
Duty at Benedict, Md., until March 1864. Moved to Port Royal, S.C., March 3–7. Duty at Hilton Head, S.C., until April 1864, and at Port Royal Island, S.C., until June. Ashepoo Expedition May 24–27. Expedition to Johns and James Islands June 30-July 10. Engaged July 7 and 9. Duty at Beaufort, S.C., until August. Moved to Bermuda Hundred, Va., August 4–8. Siege operations against Petersburg and Richmond August 1864 to April 1865. Demonstration on north side of the James River August 13–18. Skirmishes at Deep Bottom August 14–15. Russell's Mills August 16. Moved to Bermuda Hundred front August 18, then to Petersburg August 24, and duty in trenches until September 26. Demonstration on north side of James September 26–30. Battle of Chaffin's Farm, New Market Heights, September 28–30. Fort Gilmer September 29. Darbytown Road October 13. Battle of Fair Oaks October 27–28. In the trenches before Richmond until April 1865. Occupation of Richmond April 3. Duty at Richmond, Petersburg, and City Point until June. Moved to Brazos Santiago, Texas, June 7-July 1, then to Brownsville. Duty at Brownsville and on the Rio Grande River, Texas, until October 1866. Ordered to New Orleans, La., October 2.

== Casualties ==
The regiment lost a total of 315 men during service; 1 officer and 46 enlisted men killed or mortally wounded, 2 officers and 266 enlisted men died of disease.

== Commanders ==
- Colonel Thomas Bayley
- Colonel Samuel C. Armstrong

== See also ==
- List of United States Colored Troops Civil War Units
- United States Colored Troops
