= Charles P. Adams (college president) =

American academic administrator

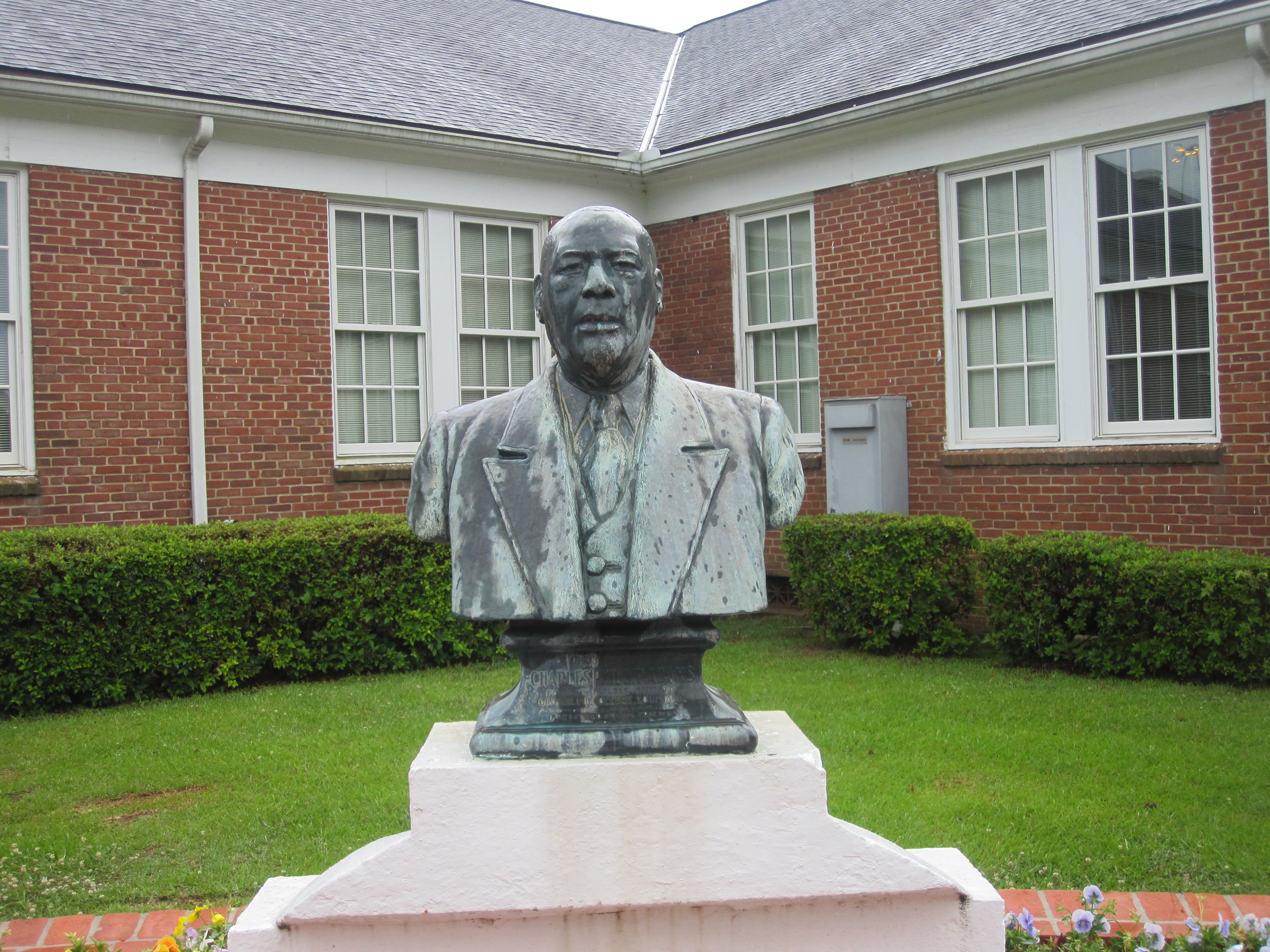
Bust of Charles P. Adams at Grambling State University

Charles Phillip Adams (July 22, 1873 – June 27, 1961) was an American academic administrator who served a 35-year term as the founding president of the Colored Industrial and Agricultural School, which later became Grambling State University.

== Early life ==
Born in Brusly, Louisiana, Adams grew up poor as the son of former slaves. He made some money through bartering and through farming his own land with his uncles, and this gave him enough money to attend college. He enrolled at the Tuskegee Institute at the age of 22. There he was a student of Booker T. Washington.

== Career ==
When the North Louisiana Farmer's Relief Association inquired with Washington as to someone who could lead the founding of an industrial school similar to Tuskegee, Washington recommended Adams. Adams was thinking of attending law school, but Washington convinced him that it would be more worthwhile to set up an educational institution for black people.

Adams became president of the school, then known as the Colored Industrial and Agricultural School, in late 1901. He has been described as "a force of nature"; he stood 6'10" tall, weighed 300 pounds, and had a booming voice.

To help generate funds for the construction of a classroom building and dormitory, Adams raised $700 from the sale of his share of the family farm. Adams was supposed to be paid $40 per month plus board, but he did not receive a paycheck from the financially strapped institution for about four years. Other than Adams, the only two original faculty members at the school were Adams' Tuskegee classmate A. C. Wilcher and Adams' future wife Martha.

The relationship between Adams and the farm organization was strained by disagreements over the general direction of the school. Adams was not opposed to seeking the financial support of white benefactors, which the farm association resisted. Some people at the school wanted to redirect the institution's focus toward preparing Baptist ministers, an idea that Adams did not support. In 1903, Adams replaced the school's board of directors with an all-white board, and the farm association tried to vote Adams out as president.

After a court case and subsequent appeal, Adams was able to remain president, but the adversarial relationships in the school's community created an untenable situation and the school separated into two competing institutions in Grambling. Adams and his supporters ran the North Louisiana Agricultural and Industrial School (later renamed Grambling State University), while Adams' critics worked at the religiously affiliated Allen Green Normal and Industrial Institute until it closed in the late 1920s.

== Later life ==
The Charles P. Adams House, built in 1936 when Adams retired, is a cottage just off the Grambling State University campus. It is listed on the National Register of Historic Places. Adams lived there until his death in 1961.
