= Charles P. Adams House =

Historic house in Louisiana, United States

- U.S. National Register of Historic Places
- Location within Louisiana Location within the United States
- Location: 549 Main Street, Grambling, Louisiana
- Coordinates: 32°31′06″N 92°42′48″W
- Area: 1 acre (0.40 ha)
- Built: 1936
- NRHP reference No.: 96000145
- Added to NRHP: February 23, 1996

The Charles P. Adams House is a historic house located at 549 Main Street in Grambling, Louisiana.

Built in 1936, it is a 1 1/2-story cottage with some aspects of Bungalow architecture, located just south of the Grambling State University campus. It was donated by the family of Charles P. Adams to the university in 1979. It is notable as the "only surviving structure directly associated with the founder of Grambling State University".

The house was listed on the National Register of Historic Places on February 23, 1996.

== See also ==
- National Register of Historic Places listings in Lincoln Parish, Louisiana
