= Samuel C. Armstrong =

American soldier and educator (1839–1893)

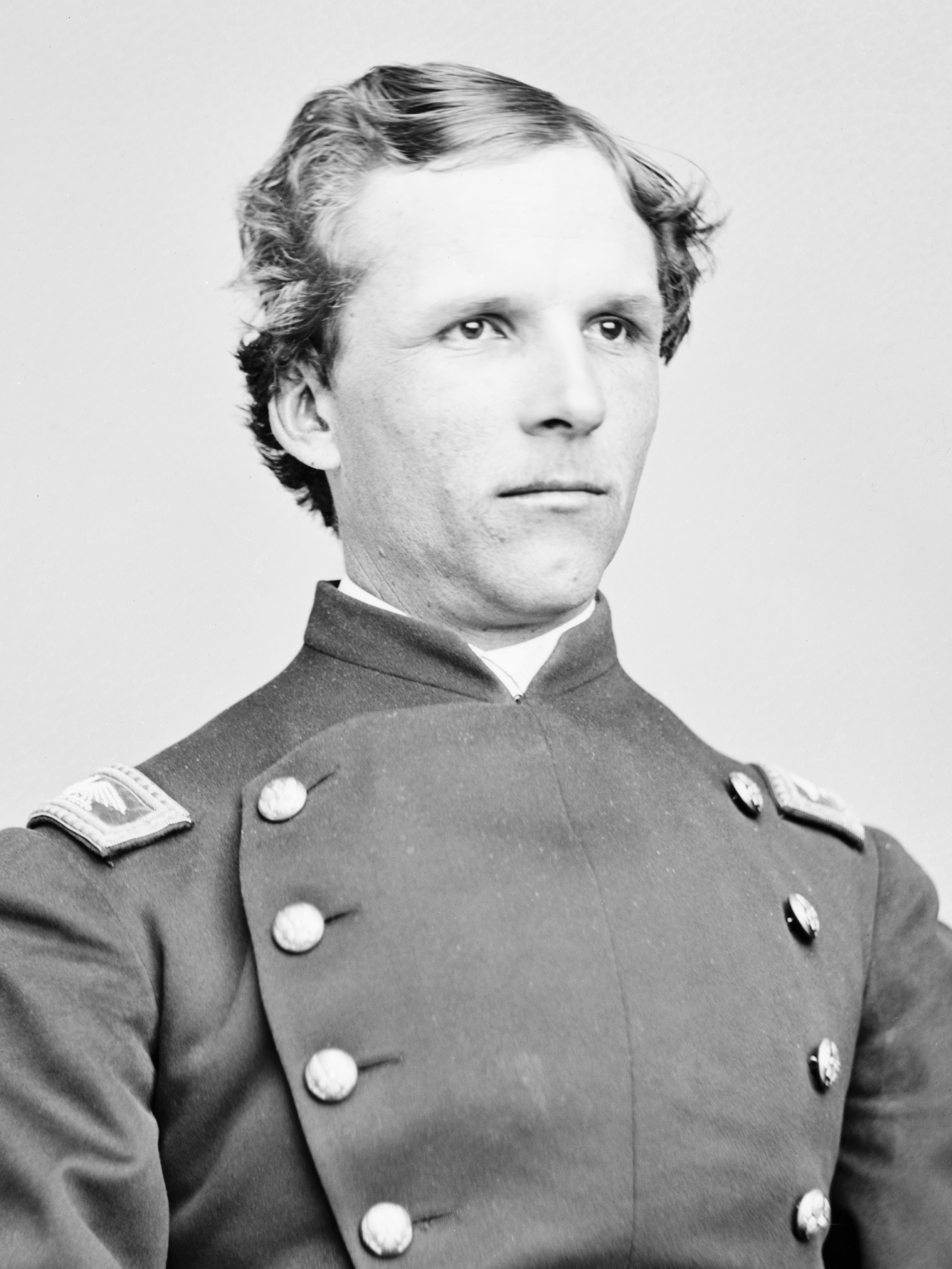
- Armstrong, c. 1865

First President of Hampton Institute
- In office 1868–1893
- Preceded by: Position established
- Succeeded by: Hollis B. Frissell

Personal details
- Born: Samuel Chapman Armstrong; January 30, 1839 Wailuku, Kingdom of Hawaiʻi
- Died: May 11, 1893 (aged 54) Hampton, Virginia, U.S.
- Resting place: Hampton Institute school cemetery, Hampton, Virginia
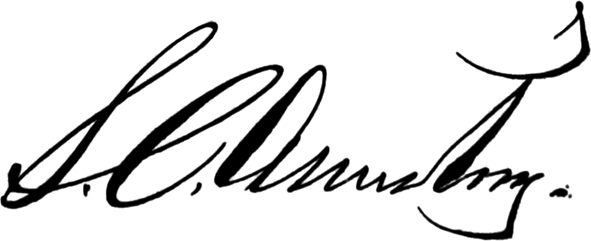
- Signature

Military service
- Allegiance: United States (Union)
- Branch/service: Union Army
- Years of service: 1862–1865
- Rank: Colonel; Bvt. Brigadier General
- Unit: 125th New York Infantry Regiment; 9th U.S. Colored Infantry Regiment
- Commands: 8th U.S. Colored Infantry Regiment
- Battles/wars: American Civil War; Battle of Harpers Ferry (POW); Battle of Gettysburg; Siege of Petersburg; First Battle of Deep Bottom; Second Battle of Deep Bottom

Samuel Chapman Armstrong (January 30, 1839 – May 11, 1893) was a soldier and general during the American Civil War who later became an educator, particularly of non-whites. The son of missionaries in Hawaii, he rose through the Union Army during the American Civil War to become a general, leading units of Black American soldiers. He became best known as an educator, founding and becoming the first principal of the normal school for Black American and later Native American pupils in Virginia which later became Hampton University. He also founded the university's museum, the Hampton University Museum, which is the oldest Black American museum in the country, and the oldest museum in Virginia.

== Early and family life ==
The third son of Christian missionary Richard Armstrong (1805–1860), Armstrong was born in Wailuku, Maui, Kingdom of Hawaiʻi, the sixth of ten children, eight of whom reached adulthood. His mother, Clarissa Chapman Armstrong, grew up in a Congregational family in Stockbridge, Massachusetts. His father was a Presbyterian minister sent by the American Board of Commissioners for Foreign Missions, which was founded by several Williams College graduates associated with various Protestant denominations. His parents were among the first missionaries to what were then known as the Sandwich Islands. Arriving in 1832, they established several Christian congregations on various Hawai'ian islands. In 1840, after the death of experienced missionary [eh?], Richard Armstrong became the second shepherd of Kawaiahaʻo Church, in Honolulu, on Oʻahu, when Samuel was an infant. Many chiefs and their families attended the historic church (which received its current name in 1853, under Richard Armstrong). Richard Armstrong also served on the kingdom's privy council and became the Minister of Education and later the Superintendent of Public Instruction. He established schools throughout the kingdom, and emphasized learning a manual trade in addition to farming. He graduated students proficient in blacksmithing, carpentry, and barrel-making, in addition to reading, writing, and arithmetic.

Like many children of missionaries and tribal leaders, Samuel attended Punahou School and the associated Oahu College, in Honolulu, for his elementary education. There is a bronze plaque at Punahou commemorating him as a "Son of Punahou". After finishing at Punahou, he became his father's secretary. After his father suffered a horseback-riding accident and died, in 1860, Samuel Armstrong, aged 21, followed his father's wishes and sailed from Hawaiʻi for the United States, to begin his own studies at Williams College, in Massachusetts. He graduated in 1862.

Armstrong married Emma Dean Walker, of Stockbridge, Massachusetts, on October 13, 1869. She died on November 10, 1878, after giving birth to two daughters, Louise H. Armstrong Scoville and Edith E. Armstrong, both of whom taught briefly at the Hampton Institute (where Louise's husband, William Scoville, served for decades as a trustee). He remained a widower for more than a decade. Armstrong remarried in Montpelier, Vermont, on September 10, 1890, to Mary Alice Ford, a teacher at the Hampton Institute. Their son, Daniel Armstrong, became a career U.S. Naval officer and commanded the Negro Recruit Training Program at the Great Lakes Naval Training Center, near Waukegan, Illinois, during World War II. Their daughter, Margaret Armstrong, married the Hampton's Institute's president during the Great Depression, Arthur Howe; their sons served as trustees from the 1950s into the 1970s.

== Civil War ==
During Samuel Armstrong's studies at Williams College, the American Civil War divided the United States. Like his father, Armstrong supported the abolition of slavery. Although he considered himself a Hawaiian, on August 15, shortly after graduating with future General and President James A. Garfield, Armstrong volunteered to serve in the Union Army. By August 26, he had recruited a company near Troy, New York, and received the rank of captain in the 125th New York Infantry, a three-years regiment in George L. Willard's brigade. Within weeks Armstrong and his troops were among the 12,000 man garrison at Harpers Ferry. Though without combat training, the 125th initially held their position during the Confederate Maryland Campaign on September 13, 1862, but were surrendered two days later by career U.S. Army officer Dixon S. Miles to Confederate General Stonewall Jackson shortly before the Battle of Antietam.

After being paroled in a prisoner exchange, Capt. Armstrong returned to the front lines in Virginia in December. The following summer, as part of the 3rd Division of the II Corps under Alexander Hays Armstrong fought at the Battle of Gettysburg in July 1863, defending Cemetery Ridge against Pickett's Charge. Armstrong subsequently received a promotion to major on August 26, 1863 (but effective July 3, 1863, the third day of the Battle of Gettysburg).

Armstrong volunteered to lead African-American troops, resigned from his New York unit, and received the rank of lieutenant colonel, and assignment to the 9th United States Colored Infantry (USCT) in November 1863. When Armstrong was assigned to command the USCT, training was conducted at Camp Stanton near Benedict, Maryland. While at Camp Stanton, Armstrong established a school to educate the black soldiers, most of whom had no education as slaves.

Lt. Col. Armstrong was then assigned to lead the 8th U.S. Colored Troops when its previous commander fell wounded. Armstrong's experiences in Hawai'i and with these regiments aroused his interest in the welfare of black Americans. Armstrong noted that Hawaiians J. R. Kealoha and Kaiwi were privates in different USCT regiments. Armstrong led the 8th Regiment during the Siege of Petersburg, and his troops became one of the first Union regiments to enter the city after the Confederates withdrew from their trenches.

In November 1864, Armstrong received a promotion to Colonel "for gallant and meritorious services at Deep Bottom and Fussell's Mill" during the Siege of Petersburg. The 8th USCT pursued the Army of Northern Virginia during the subsequent Appomattox Campaign.

After Robert E. Lee surrendered at Appomattox Court House, Armstrong and his men returned to Petersburg briefly, before being sent by sea to Ringgold Barracks near Rio Grande City on the Mexican border in Texas. On October 10, 1865, the 8th USCT began marching from Texas to Philadelphia, Pennsylvania, where Armstrong and his men were discharged out of the military on November 10, 1865, shortly after their belated arrival.

On January 13, 1866, President Andrew Johnson nominated Armstrong for the award of the brevet grade of brigadier general of volunteers to rank from March 13, 1865, and the U.S. Senate confirmed the new commission on March 12, 1866.

== Educator ==
At the war's end, Armstrong joined the Freedmen's Bureau. With the help of the American Missionary Association, he established the Hampton Normal and Agricultural Institute—now known as Hampton University—in Hampton, Virginia, in 1868. The institute was meant to be a place where black students could receive post-secondary education to become teachers, as well as training in useful job skills while paying for their education through manual labor, as his father had advocated back in Hawai'i.

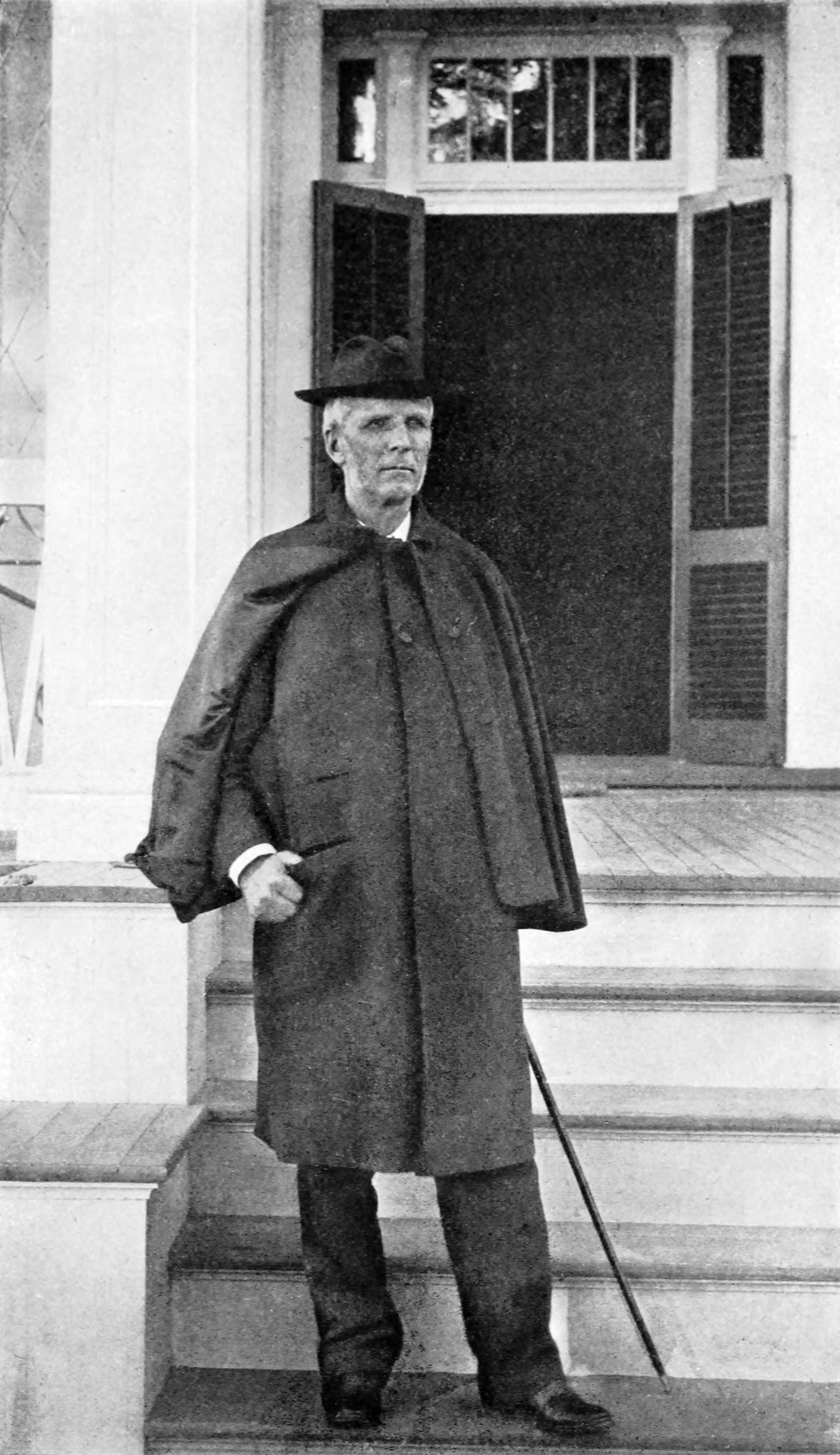
Armstrong in his later life

During Armstrong's career, and during Reconstruction, the prevailing concept of racial adjustment promoted by whites and African Americans equated technical and industrial training with the advancement of the black race. This idea was not a new solution and traced its history to before the American Civil War. But especially after the war, blacks and whites alike realized the paradox that freedom posed for the African American population in the racist south. Freedom meant liberation from the brutality and degradation of slavery, but as W. E. B. Du Bois described it, a black person "felt his poverty; without a cent, without a home, without land, tools, or savings, he had entered into competition with rich, landed, skilled neighbors. To be a poor man is hard, but to be a poor race in a land of dollars is the very bottom of hardships." Although the end of slavery was the inevitable result of the Union victory, less obvious was the fate of millions of penniless blacks in the South. Former abolitionists and white philanthropists quickly focused their energies on stabilizing the black community, assisting the newly freed blacks to become independent, positive contributors to their community, helping them improve their race and encouraging them to strive toward a standard put forth by American whites.

In the aftermath of Nat Turner's slave rebellion in 1831, the Virginia General Assembly passed new legislation making it unlawful to teach slaves, free blacks, or mulattoes to read or write. Similar laws were also enacted in other slave-holding states across the South. The removal of these laws after the Civil War helped draw attention to the problem of illiteracy as one of the great challenges confronting these people as they sought to join the free enterprise system and support themselves.

One instrument through which this process of racial uplift could take place was schools such as the Hampton Normal and Industrial Institute. The Hampton Institute exemplified the paternalistic attitudes of whites who felt it was their duty to develop those they regarded as lesser races. General Samuel Armstrong molded the curriculum to reflect his background as both a wartime abolitionist and the child of white missionaries in Hawaii. Armstrong believed that several centuries of the institution of slavery in the United States had left its blacks in an inferior moral state and only whites could help them develop to the point of American civilization. "The solution lay in a Hampton-style education, an education that combined cultural uplift with moral and manual training, or as Armstrong was fond of saying, an education that encompassed 'the head, the heart, and the hands.'" The general insisted that blacks should refrain from voting and politics because their long experience as slaves and, before that, pagans, had degraded the race beyond responsible participation in government. "Armstrong maintained that it was the duty of the superior white race to rule over the weaker dark-skinned races until they were appropriately civilized. This civilization process, in Armstrong's estimate, would require several generations of moral and religious development." The primary means through which white civilization could be instilled in African Americans was by the moral power of labor and manual industry.

At the heart of the early Hampton-style education during Armstrong's tenure was this emphasis on labor and industry. However, teaching blacks to work was a tool, not the primary goal, of the institute. Rather than producing classes of individual craftsmen and laborers, Hampton was ultimately a normal school (teacher's school) for future black teachers. In theory, these black teachers would then apply the Hampton idea of self-help and industry at schools throughout the U.S., especially the South. To this end, a prerequisite for admission to Hampton was the intent to become a teacher. In fact, "approximately 84 per cent of the 723 graduates of Hampton's first twenty classes became teachers." Armstrong strove to instill in these disciples the moral value of manual labor. This concept became the crucial component of Hampton's training of black educators.

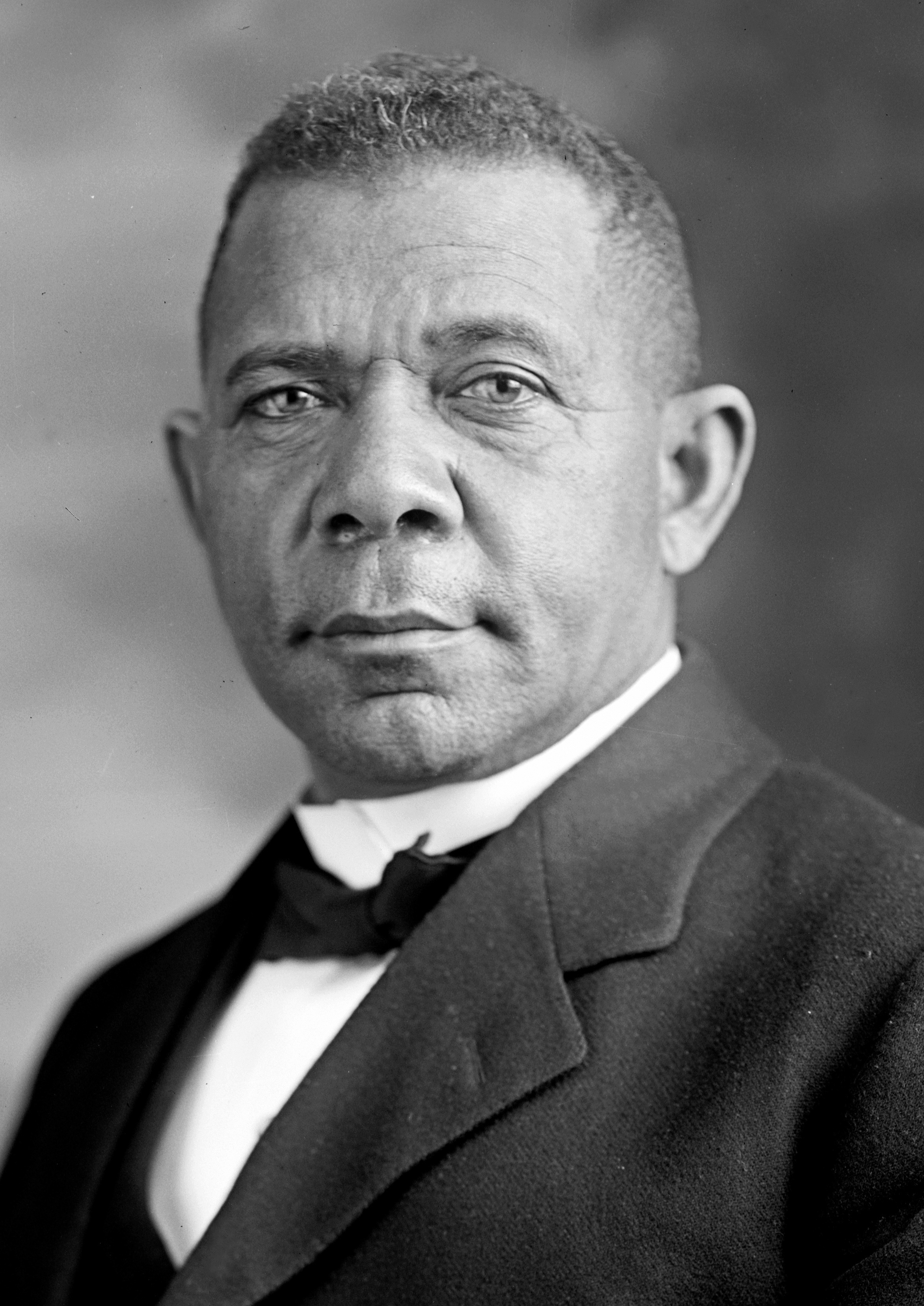
Booker T. Washington

Perhaps the best student of Armstrong's Hampton-style education was Booker T. Washington. After coming to the school in 1872, Washington immediately began to adopt Armstrong's teaching and philosophy. Washington described Armstrong as "the most perfect specimen of man, physically, mentally and spiritually the most Christ-like…." Washington also quickly learned the aim of the Hampton Institute. After leaving Hampton, he recalled being admitted to the school, despite his ragged appearance, due to the ability he demonstrated while sweeping and dusting a room. From his first day at Hampton, Washington embraced Armstrong's idea of black education.

Washington went on to attend Wayland Seminary in Washington, D.C., and he returned to Hampton to teach on Armstrong's faculty. Upon Sam Armstrong's recommendation to George W. Campbell, Lewis Adams, and Mirabeau B. Swanson, a three-man board of commissioners appointed by the Alabama Legislature, Booker Washington became in 1881 the first principal of the new normal school in Alabama, which evolved to become Tuskegee University in the 20th century. Many religious organizations, former Union Army officers and soldiers, and wealthy philanthropists were inspired by the work of pioneering educators such as Samuel Armstrong and Dr. Washington, to create and fund educational efforts specifically for the betterment of African Americans in the South.

In his autobiography Up From Slavery, Booker T. Washington stated that what made the greatest impression on him at Hampton was General Samuel C. Armstrong, "the noblest, rarest human being that it has ever been my privilege to meet." "One might have removed from Hampton all the buildings, classrooms, teachers, and industries, and given the men and women there the opportunity of coming into daily contact with General Armstrong, and that alone would have been a liberal education." (Up from Slavery, Chapter III)

== Death and legacy ==
Partially disabled by a stroke while on a speaking tour in 1892, Armstrong returned to Hampton in a private railroad car provided by his multimillionaire friend, Collis P. Huntington, builder of the Chesapeake and Ohio Railway and Newport News Shipbuilding and Drydock Company, with whom he had collaborated on black-education projects. Armstrong died at the Hampton Institute on May 11, 1893, after suffering a second stroke. His widow returned to New England. As discussed in the family section above, all his daughters would be associated with Hampton University, and his son Daniel Armstrong would become a career Naval officer and train African American troops during World War II. His grandson, Harold Howe II, became Commissioner of Education under the Presidency of Lyndon Johnson. His papers (and those of some family members) are held by the Special Collections division of the Williams College library.

=== Growth and decline of Normal Schools ===
As the ever-increasing numbers of new teachers went back to their communities, by the first third of the 20th century, over 5,000 local schools had been built for blacks in the South with private matching funds provided by individuals such as Henry H. Rogers, Andrew Carnegie, and most notably, Julius Rosenwald, each of whom had arisen from modest roots to become wealthy. Dr. Washington later wrote that, by requiring matching funds, the benefactors felt they were also addressing self-esteem. The recipients locally would have a stake in knowing that they were helping themselves through their own hard work and sacrifice. In many communities, the histories of the so-called Rosenwald schools reflect that to have proved true.

In time, the normal schools which had been originally established primarily to work with blacks at Hampton, Tuskegee, and elsewhere evolved from their primary focus on industrial training, practical skills, and basic literacy, into institutions of higher education focused not only upon training teachers, but upon teaching diverse academic subjects. Many of those institutions evolved into fully accredited universities.

=== Namesakes ===
Armstrong High School in Richmond, Virginia, was named after Armstrong in 1909.

Armstrong Manual Training School in Washington, D.C., was named for him in 1902. It was renamed Veterans High School in 1958, and then the Armstrong Adult Education Center in 1964. It currently hosts Friendship Armstrong Academy.

US Army Fort Armstrong, (Hawaii) built just before World War I, was a coastal artillery battery guarding Honolulu harbor. Part of the land was used for the Prince Kuhio Federal Building. Other parts of Fort Armstrong became a container terminal for military supplies, which still uses the name. A building and alumni award for humanitarian contributions were named for him at Punahou School.

Armstrong Hall (Science Building) at Tuskegee University was named after Armstrong in 1929.

== See also ==
- List of American Civil War generals (Union)
