= Jean de Saint Cyr =

American fortune-hunting gigolo and playboy

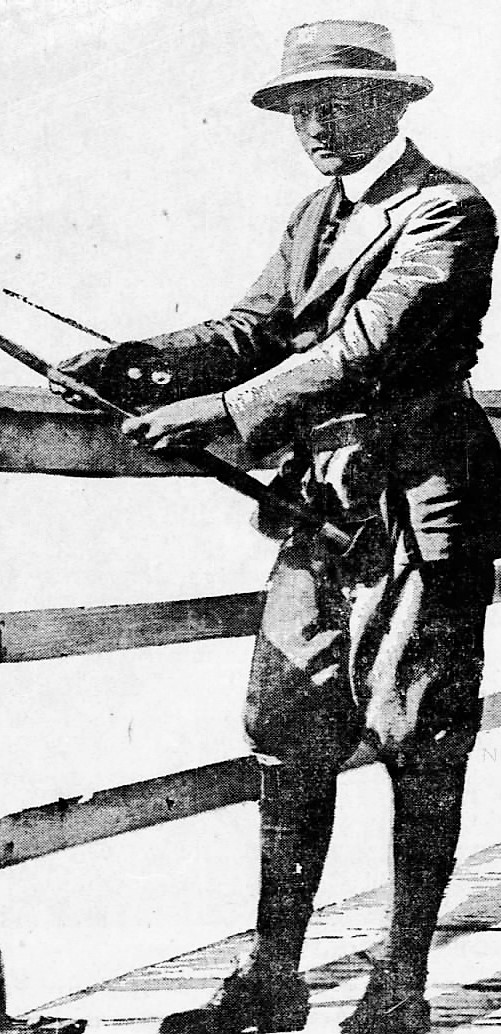
Jean de Saint Cyr fishing at Palm Beach, Florida in 1916

Jean Harold (Harald) Edward de Saint Cyr (April 9, 1875 – November 3, 1966) was the alias of John Henry Edward Thompson of Waco, Texas. He was a fortune-hunting playboy who married three older wealthy widows. His first wife Caroline Redfield was 34 years older than he was. After her husband Henry Redfield died in 1907, she began to rely on Bob Swem (aka Robert von Schwemm), an acquaintance of her husband's. Swem made himself indispensable to the widow Redfield, and was believed to be a fortune hunter. The two of them were in turn befriended by Saint Cyr, reportedly a hotel clerk who convinced both Swem and Redfield that he was affiliated with the entertainment business. When Saint Cyr became Caroline's live-in companion and escort, Swen was nudged out of the picture. Saint Cyr and Caroline married in 1909, and he inherited the bulk of her $1,000,000 estate upon her death in January 1915.

In April 1915 he married Annie Armstrong Stewart Smith. She was the widow of one of the world's wealthiest men, and 11 years older than Saint Cyr. They belonged to the international social set of wealthy people whose entire lifestyle consisted of attending parties. During this marriage, Saint Cyr employed fake non-American accents to suit whichever nationality he was pretending to be. The couple lived on her estate in San Mateo, California. Upon her 1925 death, Saint Cyr received one-third of the estate, and was also named as an executor of the will, and trustee over two of the estate's funds. The Eugene J. de Sabla, Jr., Teahouse and Tea Garden portion of the estate is currently on the National Register of Historic Places for San Mateo County, California.

His third wife Helen Strong Carter was only nine years older than he was. Heiress to the Eastman Kodak fortune, and the widow of Hawaii governor George R. Carter, she and Saint Cyr married in April 1939, and she filed for divorce in December 1939.

== Background ==
He was born John (Jack) Henry Edward Thompson on April 9, 1875, in Waco, Texas. Little is known about his early life in Texas. He was living in New York by 1907. Having unsuccessfully tried his luck in a variety of jobs, including musical stage productions, he began promoting himself as a theatrical agent by the name of Jean Harold Edward de Saint Cyr. With various spellings, he used the name Saint Cyr throughout the rest of his life.

== Caroline Redfield ==
Caroline Peck Redfield was born October 3, 1840, and was 34 years older than Saint Cyr. Trenton, New Jersey resident Bob Swem (aka Robert von Schwemm) met Phoenix National Bank president Henry A. Redfield and his wife Caroline through mutual acquaintance Alfred Moore Livingstone. After her husband's February 1907 death, Caroline began relying on Swem as a social escort. He moved into the Redfield house and made himself indispensable as her escort, secretary and accountant. He came to assume he would inherit her estate.

It is believed that Swem and Mrs. Redfield first met Saint Cyr when he worked as a hotel clerk at Alexandria Bay, New York. He presented himself as affiliated with the entertainment field, and was apparently overt that Saint Cyr was a stage name. Although his attire was that of someone down on his luck, he charmed her enough to get his foot in the door, and eventually became a permanent resident in her home. From that point forward, Saint Cyr lived the life of what was then called a "kept man", a gigolo financially supported by a wealthy woman in exchange for his relationship in her life. She bought him expensive clothing, a new car, and hired a French chauffeur and a Japanese valet for him. He began to treat the household staff as though they worked for him, and by 1908 replaced Swem in her affections. Lavishing her wealth upon both Saint Cyr and Swem severely drained her inheritance and necessitated the sale of the Redfield mansion on March 31, 1909.

They moved to Yonkers, where she and Saint Cyr secretly wed on June 9, 1909. The bride was 68 years old, and the groom was 34. Her last will was made June 18, 1912, amended by a codicil on October 2, 1913. Omitting Swem entirely, the bulk of her $1,000,000 estate was left to Saint Cyr. Her son Henry S. Redfield was bequeathed $150,000 and some valuable jewels. After her January 2, 1915, death of pneumonia, her will was contested by her son.

== Annie Armstrong Stewart Smith ==
Annie Armstrong Stewart Smith was born May 2, 1864, and was 11 years older than Saint Cyr. Prior to meeting him, she had lived a life of the socially elite, those whose existence revolved around traveling from one party to another, one resort to another. Her first marriage was to affluent lawyer William Rhinelander Stewart Sr. Their daughter Anita became Princess Miguel of Braganza, Duchess of Viseu. The marriage also produced a son, William Rhinelander Stewart Jr. After divorcing her first husband, she married James Henry "Silent" Smith in 1907, considered one of the world's wealthiest men. He died on their honeymoon.

According to a friend of the Redfields, Colonel Alfred Montgomery Shook, Saint Cyr was distraught after the death of his wife Caroline. However, Major E. Gray Pendleton, who introduced him to Annie Smith a month later, said Saint Cyr was eager to resume the party lifestyle. Shortly after their April 25, 1915, marriage, Pendleton confronted them about reports that Saint Cyr's life prior to the Redfield marriage was that of an average working man employed in a variety of temporary professions. His new wife's response was, "I don't care what they call him, as long as they don't call me an old woman."

Saint Cyr had begun to affect a French accent, claiming to have been born near Paris. While he and his new wife were in Palm Beach, Florida, in 1916, investigative journalists outed him as Jack Thompson of Texas. Happening concurrently with the exposé of his real identity, was an ongoing court battle contesting the will of Caroline Redfield. The couple denied he was Jack Thompson, but they eventually left Palm Beach amid the brewing scandal. A year later, journalists took note that he had replaced the fake French accent with a British accent.

There was an indication of a separation at some point in the marriage, but not a divorce. Upon Anne de Saint Cyr's March 3, 1925 death, they were living on an estate in San Mateo, California, that she had purchased in June 1919. It included the Eugene J. de Sabla, Jr., Teahouse and Tea Garden that is currently on the National Register of Historic Places for the county. The NRHP form states, "In 1922, upon dissolution of the second marriage, Anne sold it back to her husband." Her 1925 obituary lists Saint Cyr as her husband, sitting by her bedside with the rest of the family at the time of death. Her estate was valued at $40,000,000. Saint Cyr received one-third of the estate, and was also named as an executor of the will, and trustee over two of the estate's funds.

As a wealthy widower, he continued the lifestyle to which he had become accustomed, among the rich and famous of his era. He hosted the 1926 wedding of actress Constance Talmadge and her second husband Alastair MacIntosh on the estate. In 1926, Jean de Saint Cyr sold the mansion and grounds to a real estate developer. The Eugene J. de Sabla, Jr. Teahouse and Tea Garden was not included in the sale. The 1928 party he hosted at the Menlo Polo Club was described as, "one of the most elaborate and unique parties given on the peninsula".

== Helen Strong Carter ==
Born March 11, 1866, Helen Strong Carter was nine years older than Saint Cyr. She was the widow of Hawaii governor George R. Carter, who died in 1933. Carter was a wealthy heiress through her father Henry A. Strong, co-founder and president of Eastman Kodak, and his first wife Helen Phoebe Griffin. Carter was known for her philanthropic generosities. She helped establish, and sat on the board of directors of, the dental hygiene program at the University of Hawaii, and the Honolulu Dental Infirmary. The Strong-Carter Dental Clinic was established to train young women for careers as dental hygienists. In 1922, Helen and her sister Gertrude made a $1,000,000 donation towards the building fund for the Strong Memorial Hospital at the University of Rochester in New York.

In what the news reports called a "surprise ceremony", Saint Cyr and Carter were wed in New Orleans on April 26, 1939, attended only by her son, one of her daughters and her son-in-law. A month after the wedding, Saint Cyr sold the teahouse and grounds to her for $400,000. It was a short-lived marriage. The couple spent September–October 1939 entertaining at her Honolulu estate. By December, she had taken up residence in Reno, Nevada to file for divorce. At the same time her attorneys claimed his "whereabouts unknown", the Los Angeles Times reported he was in Hollywood hosting a dinner party at the Earl Carroll Theatre for American socialite Louise Cromwell Brooks, wife of actor Lionel Atwill. The divorce was finalized February 17, 1940, and she resumed using the name Helen Strong Carter. Afterwards, she sold the Japanese teahouse and garden to developer David D. Bohannon.

== Later years and death ==
By 1959 at age 84, Saint Cyr was afflicted with Parkinson's disease, and was unable to care for himself. His foster son H. R. Friss was named as his conservator. Attempts to contact relatives in California and Texas received no response.

When he died November 3, 1966, the will that was probated had been executed in 1949. At the time of death, the estate was valued at $500,000. Probate proceedings listed a brother and five sisters. He was buried next to his second wife Annie Armstrong Stewart Smith, in Cypress Lawn Memorial Park at San Mateo.
