= Helen Strong Carter =

First Lady of the Territory of Hawaii; philanthropist

First Lady of the Territory of Hawaii
- In office 1903–1907
- Governor: George R. Carter
- Preceded by: Anna Prentice Cate Dole
- Succeeded by: Mary Dillingham Frear

Personal details
- Born: Helen Strong; March 11, 1866 Rochester, New York, U.S.
- Died: May 28, 1945 (aged 79) San Francisco, California, U.S.
- Spouse(s): George R. Carter (1892–1933; his death); Jean de Saint Cyr (div.)
- Children: 4, including Elizabeth Carter Bogardus

Helen Strong Carter (1866–1945) was First Lady of the Territory of Hawaii from 1903 to 1907. Her philanthropic activities included the establishment of the Strong-Carter Dental Clinic at Palama Settlement in Hawaii, and the Strong Memorial Hospital in Rochester, New York.

== Personal life ==
She was born in Rochester, New York, on March 11, 1866, to the co-founder and first president of Eastman Kodak, Henry A. Strong (1838–1919) and his first wife Helen Phoebe Griffin (1839–1904). The family had one daughter besides Helen, Gertrude Strong Achilles, and two sons Henry Griffin Strong and Herbert Strong who died in infancy. On April 19, 1892, she married George R. Carter in Rochester, the son of Hawaii diplomat Henry A. P. Carter. The couple returned to live in Hawaii in 1893, and had three daughters and one son: Elizabeth, Phoebe, another daughter who died in 1903, and George Robert Jr.

Her husband was appointed the second Territorial Governor of Hawaii for the term November 23, 1903 – August 15, 1907. Governor Carter died in 1933, and Helen remarried to Jean de Saint Cyr in April 1939. They divorced in 1940, and she resumed using the Carter name.

== Philanthropies ==
The dental hygiene program at the University of Hawaii, and the Honolulu Dental Infirmary, with her husband George as president, were established with endowments from Helen in memory of her parents. Both Helen and her husband served on the board of directors. In addition to providing dental care and dental hygiene education to the public, the School of Dental Hygiene was established to train young women for careers as dental hygienists. The school was opened in 1920 at Palama Settlement in the Kalihi area, and the first year focused on 1st- and 2nd-grade students. The first meeting of the board of directors in July 1921 reported that, with the clinic only open one day a week with a hygienist and dentist, they had treated 1168 patients. The clinic was later renamed as the Strong-Carter Dental Clinic. On the 20th anniversary of the clinic, her generosity in establishing the clinic was honored by 20,000 children at Honolulu Stadium. The festivities included a performance by the Royal Hawaiian Band and the President William McKinley High School Reserve Officers' Training Corps.

In 1922, Helen and her sister Gertrude were the only two members of their immediate family remaining when they honored their parents with a $1,000,000 donation towards the building fund for the Strong Memorial Hospital at the University of Rochester in New York. Their donation was part of a total of $15,091,671 in individual gifts for the construction.

== Death ==
Helen Strong Carter died on May 28, 1945, in San Francisco, California.

== Bibliography ==
- Fitch, Charles E. (1916). Encyclopedia of Biography of New York, a Life Record of Men and Women Whose Sterling Character and Energy and Industry Have Made Them Preëminent in Their Own and Many Other States. The American historical society, inc. – via HathiTrust.
