= Elizabeth Carter Bogardus =

Hawaiian founder of the Junior League of Honolulu (1895–1928)

- Born: Elizabeth Carter III; August 28, 1895; Honolulu, Hawaiian Kingdom (now Hawaii, U.S.)
- Died: December 21, 1928 (aged 33); Honolulu, Territory of Hawaii (now Hawaii, U.S.)
- Burial place: O'ahu Cemetery, Honolulu, Hawaii, U.S.
- Occupation(s): Community leader, socialite
- Spouse: Washington Everardus Bogardus (m. 1917–1928; her death)
- Parents: George Robert Carter (father); Helen Strong Carter (mother)
- Relatives: Henry Alpheus Peirce Carter (paternal grandfather), Henry A. Strong (maternal grandfather), Gerrit P. Judd (paternal great grandfather)

Elizabeth Carter Bogardus (née Carter; 1895–1928) was a Hawaiian community leader, socialite, and the founder of the Junior League of Honolulu.

== Early life and family ==
Elizabeth Carter was born on August 28, 1895, in Honolulu, Hawaiian Kingdom (now Oahu, Hawaii, U.S.), to American parents Helen (née Strong) and George Robert Carter. Her parents came from the United States to the Hawaiian Kingdom two years prior to her birth, in 1893. Her mother Helen Strong Carter worked as a philanthropist, and helped establish medical and dental facilities in Hawaii. Her father George Robert Carter served as the second territorial governor of Hawaii. Her grandfathers included Henry A. Strong, an Eastman Kodak president; and Henry Alpheus Peirce Carter, a diplomat in the Hawaiian Kingdom.

In October 1917, she married Washington Everardus Bogardus (1896–1931), a banker from a prominent American family of Dutch heritage.

== Career ==
In 1923, Bogardus founded the Junior League of Honolulu with 30 female founding members, a local Junior League nonprofit organizations. At the time of its founding, the group was focused on working with the local children's hospital, Kapiʻolani Maternity Home (now Kapiolani Medical Center for Women and Children).

The League produced a movie, The Kamaaina (1929), which was shown in various locations in the United States. By 1928, the league had grown to 117 members. The Junior League of Honolulu has later focused on community service projects for Honolulu and the greater area.

Additionally Bogardus had lobbied for the preservation of Queen Emma Summer Palace (Hānaiakamalama) in Honolulu and Huliheʻe Palace in Kailua-Kona.

== Death and legacy ==
Bogardus died on December 21, 1928 in Honolulu, Territory of Hawaii, at the age of 33 after an illness. She was survived by her husband and parents, and was buried at O'ahu Cemetery in Honolulu.

After her death, a bed at the Kapiʻolani Maternity Home children's hospital was dedicated in her honor. In 1929, a new Junior League building at the Pearl Harbor Yacht Club was erected as a memorial for Bogardus.
