= Joseph O. Carter =

American legal advisor (1835–1909)

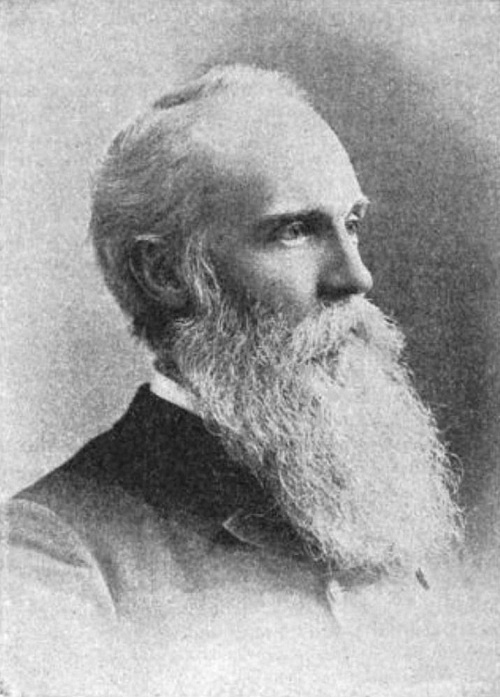
- Born: Joseph Oliver Carter; December 20, 1835; Honolulu, Kingdom of Hawaii
- Died: February 27, 1909 (aged 73)
- Occupation: Attorney
- Known for: Kingdom of Hawaii Privy Council; Bishop Estate Trustee; Bishop Museum Director; C. Brewer & Co. President and Manager; Commercial Agent for Japan
- Spouse: Mary Elizabeth Ladd
- Children: Charlotte; Mary; Rachel; Joseph Oliver Jr. Sarah; Henry
- Parent(s): Capt. Joseph O. Carter Sr. Hannah Trufant Lord

Joseph Oliver Carter (December 20, 1835 – February 27, 1909), known professionally as Joseph O. Carter, also known as J. O. Carter and Joe Carter, was a legal advisor to Queen Liliʻuokalani, serving on her Privy Council of State.

He served in the Provisional Government of Hawaii after the overthrow of the Kingdom of Hawaii and was an opponent to annexation by the United States. Carter was trustee of many large estates in Hawaii and was one of the first directors of the Bishop Museum.

During the reign of King Kalākaua, Carter was Acting Commercial Agent for Japan and served two terms as representative in the Legislature of the Kingdom of Hawaii. He was president of C. Brewer & Co. in Honolulu.

== Early life and family background ==
Carter was born December 20, 1835, in a grass house in Honolulu, the first of six children of Massachusetts sea captain Joseph Oliver Carter (1802–1850) and his wife Hannah Trufant Lord (1809–1898). Captain Carter was a trader of Chinese commodities to Hawaii and California, and was the first-generation Carter family immigrant in the Kingdom of Hawaii. Hannah Trufant Lord of Hallowell, Maine immigrated to Hawaii in 1832 and married Capt. Carter in 1833, spending the first few years of their married life accompanying him on his voyages.

According to Territorial Governor of Hawaii George R. Carter, son of Joseph's brother Henry A. P. Carter (1837–1891), no one in the family was named Joseph Oliver Carter Sr., and the only Jr. was a grandson of the sea captain. Sons Henry and Samuel Morrill Carter (1838–1893) were also born in Honolulu. Son Alfred Wellington Carter (1840–1890) was born aboard the ship Caliope off the coast of Tahiti. Their two youngest children Frederick William Carter (1842–1860), and Catherine Rebecca Carter Lewers (1844–1924) were born in Honolulu.

Governor Carter recalled being told by his uncle Joseph that after his birth in Honolulu, he and his mother Hannah accompanied Capt. Carter on a trip to Hong Kong where the young Joseph was baptized by a British sea captain. On November 28, 1859, he wed Mary Ladd, daughter of William Ladd who formed the sugar cane partnership Ladd & Co. Mrs. Carter was a lady-in-waiting to Liliʻuokalani. The couple had six children.

== Early career and politics ==
One of Carter's earliest jobs was as a journalist with the Pacific Commercial Advertiser. He was secretary of the local fire department and then elected as "Delegate to the Fire Department".

Carter was collector of special tax for roads and bridges, and eventually set up his own office as a tax collector. Shortly before the election of King Kalākaua, Carter began to rise in the political arena. He served two terms with the House of Representatives in the Legislature of the Kingdom of Hawaii, for sessions April 30 – July 29, 1872 and January 8 – 20, 1873. During the 1874 Honolulu Courthouse riot provoked by the Legislative Assembly electing Kalākaua over Queen Emma, former representative Carter sustained injuries when he became a target of mob harassment and violence while helping to rescue legislators. When he refused to leave the scene, the rioters carried him off. He was subsequently appointed as Commercial Agent for Japan in September 1880, succeeding J. D. Brewer, and served until the establishment of the Japanese Consulate in 1885 and appointment of Jiro Nakamura. Carter also served as registrar for public accounts. He began at C. Brewer & Co. in 1880 as treasurer and secretary, and worked his way up to being elected president and manager of the company.

== Adviser to Liliʻuokalani and annexation ==
Carter managed Liliʻuokalani's personal real estate holdings and had been her friend and confidant for years before she ascended to the throne on January 29, 1891. When Liliʻuokalani became regent, Carter was appointed royal adviser on the Privy Council of State. At a June 23, 1892 ceremony at Iolani Palace when Japanese Consul-General Taigo Masaki bestowed Liliuokalani with the Grand Cross of the Imperial Japanese Order of the Crown, Carter was bestowed with Third Class Order of the Sacred Treasurer.

Liliʻuokalani's proposed 1893 Constitution provoked protests, but Carter advised against her cabinet's suggestion of requesting American intervention to maintain civil order. He prepared a proclamation signed by the Queen and her cabinet that promulgation of a new constitution had been abandoned, but it was not enough to stave off the overthrow and installation of a provisional local government. Carter counseled her to resign under protest, and on January 17 she temporarily ceded her power to the United States. Following the overthrow, Carter was part of a group sent to Washington D. C. by the provisional government to plead its case for annexation. He was appointed by provisional president Sanford B. Dole to the Board of Health.

President Grover Cleveland attempted a restoration of the monarchy, with the stipulation that Liliʻuokalani grant amnesty to everyone responsible. Over her demands of beheadings for all involved, Carter obtained her written assent to amnesty. Dole refused to re-instate the Queen, and the Republic of Hawaii was declared on July 4, 1894.

Carter's standing in the business community suffered from his association with the Queen. According to Boston author Julius A. Palmer Jr., Carter's loyalty to her resulted in his being voted out of his position at C. Brewer & Co. The Queen was put on trial and under house arrest for her alleged part in the 1895 Robert Wilcox rebellion attempt to restore her to the throne. She was granted a full pardon in October 1896. When she left Hawaii for the United States in December, seeing her off at Honolulu Harbor were Carter, on whose arm she leaned as she walked up the gangplank, Robert Wilcox, and her former Minister of Foreign Affairs Samuel Parker.

At an October 1897 gathering of 2,000 anti-annexationists, Carter was the main speaker. He traveled to Washington D. C. in January 1898 to lobby against annexation. Newspaper coverage alleged he made the trip at the request of sugar plantation owner Claus Spreckels. When Hawaii was annexed in 1898, the Crown Lands were seized by the United States government. Liliʻuokalani spent the next several years unsuccessfully lobbying the government for return of the Crown Lands, during which she relied on Carter for legal consultation.

== Trustee-estate manager business ==
Toward the end of his life, Carter was handling all Liliʻuokalani's financial affairs. Carter was trustee and/or executor of the estates of several members of the Hawaiian nobility, including King Lunalilo. Most notably, the trusteeship that occupied much of Carter's final years was the Bernice P. Bishop estate. In addition to being one of the estate's trustees, he was one of the early directors of the Bishop Museum. Native Hawaiian politician John Adams Cummins, son of High Chiefess Kaumakaokane Papaliʻaiʻaina, made Carter trustee of his estate. He was one of the executors of the estate of James Campbell, husband of Abigail Kuaihelani Campbell who was a descendant of the Kalanikini line of Maui chieftains. At the time of his death, Campbell was one of the largest landholders in the Territory of Hawaii and left an estate estimated at $3,000,000.

He was designated as trustee and/or estate manager of numerous non-nobility trusts, including that of his brother Henry A. P. Carter, and as a trustee of Central Union Church. Samuel C. Allen, Kauai businessman, developer and financial backer of Port Allen, Hawaii, left an estate in excess of $2,000,000 in 1903, naming Carter as one of his executors.

== Death ==
Mary Carter died December 15, 1908, after an extended illness. Her obituary noted her close friendship with Liliʻuokalani. Joseph O. Carter died of pulmonary edema on February 27, 1909. His sister Catherine Rebecca Carter Lewers was his only surviving sibling. The Carters were survived by their children Joseph Jr., Henry, Charlotte, Mary, Rachel and Sara.

== See also ==
- Robert Lewers

== Notes ==
=== Bibliography ===
- Alexander, William DeWitt (1896). History of Later Years of the Hawaiian Monarchy and the Revolution of 1893. Honolulu, HI: Honolulu, Hawaiian Gazette Company – via HathiTrust.
- Bonura, Sandra; Day, Deborah (2012). An American Girl in the Hawaiian Islands: Letters of Carrie Prudence Winter, 1890–1893. University of Hawai'i Press. ISBN 978-0-8248-3722-8 – via Project MUSE.
- Bonura, Sandra; Witmer, Sally (2013). "Lydia K. Aholo — Her Story Recovering the Lost Voice". Hawaiian Journal of History. 47. Hawaiian Historical Society. hdl:10524/36266.
- Carter, George Robert (1915). Joseph Oliver Carter: the founder of the Carter family in Hawaii, with a brief genealogy. Genealogical Committee of the Hawaiian Historical Society – via HathiTrust.
- Dabagh, Jean (1974). "King is Elected: One Hundred Years Ago". Hawaiian Journal of History. 8. Hawaiian Historical Society. hdl:10524/112.
- Palmer, Julius A. (1894). Memories of Hawaii and Hawaiian correspondence. Boston, MA: Lee and Shepard – via HathiTrust.
- Lydecker, Robert Colfax, ed. (1918). Roster Legislatures of Hawaii, 1841–1918. Honolulu: Hawaiian Gazette Company. OCLC 60737418.
- Kuykendall, Ralph Simpson (1967). The Hawaiian Kingdom 1874–1893, The Kalakaua Dynasty. Vol. 3. Honolulu: University of Hawaii Press. ISBN 978-0-87022-433-1. OCLC 500374815.
- Liliʻuokalani (1898). Hawaii's story by Hawaii's Queen, Liliʻuokalani. Boston, MA: Lee & Shepard – via HathiTrust.
- Wakukawa, Ernest Katsumi (1938). A History of the Japanese People in Hawaii. Honolulu: The Toyo Shoin. OCLC 10076382.
