= Pritchard-Strong Company =

- Industry: Manufacturing
- Founded: 1905
- Founder: Albert R. Pritchard; Henry A. Strong; Henry G. Strong; Thomas B. Pritchard

The Pritchard-Strong Company of Rochester, NY, was a manufacturer of lanterns and other hardware specialties. It was founded in 1905 by partners Albert R. Pritchard, Henry A. Strong, Henry G. Strong and Thomas B. Pritchard. At the time of incorporation, stock ownership was as follows: Albert R. Pritchard, 490 shares, Henry A. Strong, 490 shares, Henry G. Strong, 10 shares, and Thomas B. Pritchard, 10 shares.

In 1909, Henry G. Strong left the company to enter the automobile business, and it was subsequently renamed, The Pritchard Stamping Company. The Pritchard Stamping Company went out of business in 1919.

In addition to various household items, they manufactured kerosene lanterns under the names "Pritchard-Strong" and "Prisco". They also manufactured lanterns for Standard Oil, under the "Rayo" brand name.
