= Gay Polo League =

Worldwide polo club

The Gay Polo League is a worldwide organization of LGBTQ polo players with members in 15 countries.

== History ==
It was founded in 2006 by polo player Chip McKenney. It is headquartered in Wellington, Florida.

The league has been designated by the United States Polo Association (USPA) as a polo club. It has organized clinics and social events at Eldorado Polo Club, Empire Polo Club, Menlo Polo Club, San Diego Polo Club, Santa Barbara Polo Club, and Will Rogers Polo Club in Los Angeles. Recently, the Polo League has held events celebrating their pride as well as their love for the sport at the International Gay Polo Tournament hosted at the National Polo Center (formally International Polo Club Palm Beach.) The league has also produced GPL polo events in Argentina, England and France.

Since 2010, the league has organized an annual International Gay Polo Tournament. The tournament took place at the Grand Champions Polo Club, owned by Melissa and Marc Ganzi, until 2014. In 2015, it moved to the International Polo Club Palm Beach. During the tournament, each team is joined by a high-goaler. For example, in 2010, eight-goal Nic Roldan joined one of the teams.

The GPL is a 501(c)(3) designated organization and has made charitable contributions to the Wellington Rotary Club, Compass, Palm Beach County chapter of the Human Rights Council, Services & Advocacy for GLBT Elders (SAGE), and onePulse Foundation.
