= DeSabla, California =

Unincorporated community in California, United States

De Sabla
- Unincorporated community
- Location in California De Sabla (the United States)
- Coordinates: 39°52′28″N 121°36′45″W
- Country: United States
- State: California
- County: Butte
- Elevation: 2,762 ft (842 m)

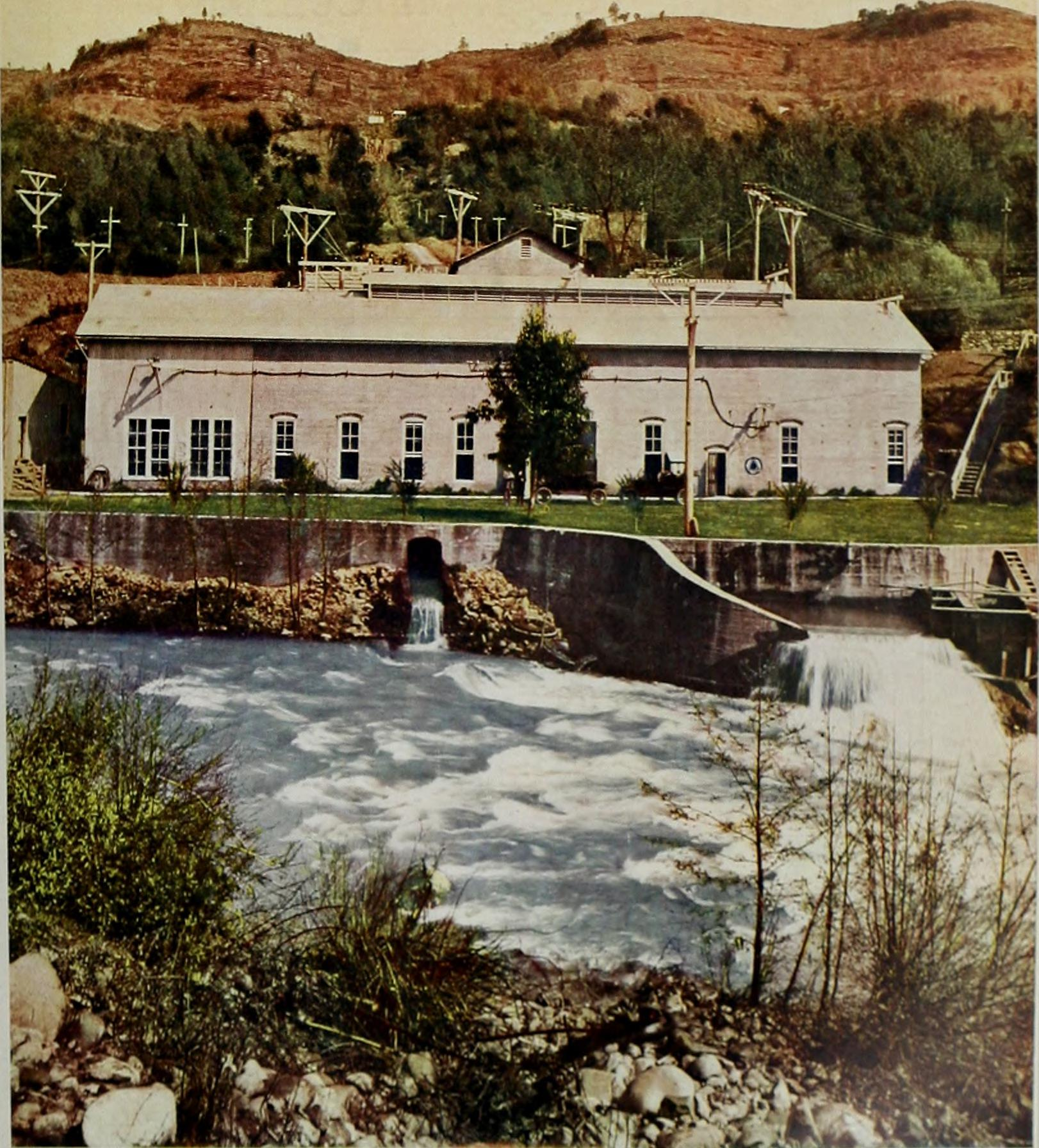

DeSabla (also known as De Sabla, deSabla and de Sabla; formerly, Hupps Mill and Hupp) is an unincorporated community in Butte County, California, United States. It lies at an elevation of 2762 feet (842 m) and was named after one of the Pacific Gas and Electric founders and is the site of Lake de Sabla reservoir and a powerhouse named for him. The community's ZIP code is 95954, and is shared with the community of Magalia. The area code is 530. NAD27 latitude and longitude for the community are 39°52′26″N 121°36′06″W and official elevation is 2,780 feet (850 m) above mean sea level.

== Climate ==
DeSabla has a hot-summer Mediterranean climate (Csa) according to the Köppen climate classification system.

Climate data for De Sabla (1906-2012)
Month	Jan	Feb	Mar	Apr	May	Jun	Jul	Aug	Sep	Oct	Nov	Dec	Year
Record high °F (°C)	82 (28)	82 (28)	87 (31)	94 (34)	97 (36)	108 (42)	109 (43)	112 (44)	106 (41)	102 (39)	90 (32)	86 (30)	112 (44)
Mean daily maximum °F (°C)	52.3 (11.3)	54.2 (12.3)	59.5 (15.3)	64.9 (18.3)	73.8 (23.2)	82.8 (28.2)	90.5 (32.5)	90.0 (32.2)	83.8 (28.8)	72.6 (22.6)	58.2 (14.6)	51.1 (10.6)	69.5 (20.8)
Mean daily minimum °F (°C)	31.8 (−0.1)	33.6 (0.9)	35.9 (2.2)	38.8 (3.8)	45.1 (7.3)	51.2 (10.7)	56.2 (13.4)	54.9 (12.7)	49.8 (9.9)	43.6 (6.4)	36.5 (2.5)	32.3 (0.2)	42.5 (5.8)
Record low °F (°C)	−2 (−19)	11 (−12)	14 (−10)	16 (−9)	21 (−6)	31 (−1)	39 (4)	28 (−2)	30 (−1)	19 (−7)	15 (−9)	5 (−15)	−2 (−19)
Average precipitation inches (mm)	11.89 (302)	11.62 (295)	9.59 (244)	5.13 (130)	2.91 (74)	0.91 (23)	0.04 (1.0)	0.15 (3.8)	1.14 (29)	3.75 (95)	7.87 (200)	12.67 (322)	67.67 (1,718.8)
Average snowfall inches (cm)	11 (28)	4.9 (12)	6.7 (17)	1.3 (3.3)	0 (0)	0 (0)	0 (0)	0 (0)	0 (0)	0 (0)	1.1 (2.8)	4.4 (11)	29.4 (75)
Average precipitation days	12.6	11.5	11.7	8.9	6.3	2.9	0.3	0.7	2.7	5.8	10.6	12.6	86.6
Source: WRCC

== History ==
The Hupp post office opened in 1909, changed its name to De Sabla in 1911, and closed in 1942. Hupp was named in honor of John Hupp, sawmill owner; De Sabla was named in honor of Eugene de Sabla, who supervised construction of a power generation station here in 1903.
