= Robert Lewers =

American businessman (1836–1926)

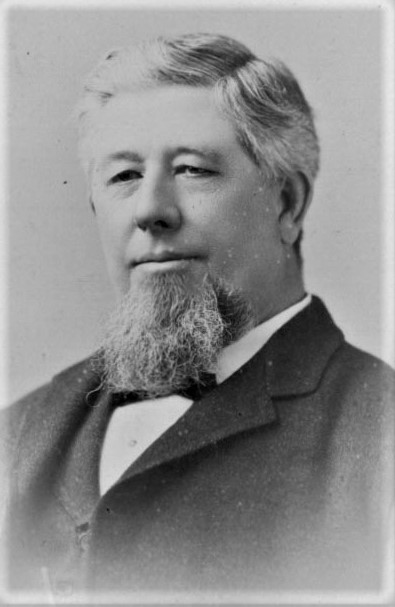
- Born: March 15, 1836; New York City
- Died: November 3, 1924 (aged 88); Honolulu, Hawaii
- Occupation: Businessman
- Spouse: Catherine Rebecca Carter
- Children: William; Harriett

Robert Lewers (March 15, 1836 – November 3, 1926) was a businessman during the Kingdom of Hawaii, Republic of Hawaii, and Territory of Hawaii. Born in New York City, he accompanied his cousin Christopher H. Lewers to Honolulu. The two of them worked to build a lumber firm, and benefited from the influx of sugar plantation customers following the Reciprocity Treaty of 1875. Upon the death of Christopher, Robert continued the business and in 1880, he and partner Charles Montague Cooke renamed it Lewers & Cooke, Ltd.

== Early life and career ==
He was born in New York City on March 15, 1836. His parents were William and Mary Lowe Lewers. His cousin Christopher H. Lewers (C. H. Lewers) preceded him to Hawaii and, along with partner J. G. Dickson, established the Lewers & Dickson lumber business. A few years later, C. H. Lewers enjoyed a sojourn on America's east coast, and returned to Hawaii on February 21, 1856, with his cousin Robert in tow. After employment in a variety of carpentry jobs, Robert went to work for his cousin C. H. in 1860.

Initially, business was modest, but the economic prosperity from the Reciprocity Treaty of 1875 trickled down to the lumber industry as sugar plantations had increasing needs for on-site construction materials. C.H. died in 1877, at which time Robert Lewers and Charles Montague Cooke (C. M. Cooke) formed a partnership with Dickson. Frederick J. Lowrey became employed there in 1879. Upon the 1880 death of Dickson, the firm became Lewers & Cooke, Ltd. Breaking away from the norms of businesses of that era, the new partnership stipulated in their articles of incorporation that the directors be given the discretion of making corporate contributions towards the social and religious benefit of the community. Lowrey was made a partner in 1886, and became president in 1901.

Transporting lumber evolved during Lewers' association with the company, from drays and hand carts to motorized vehicles. Two schooners were launched for the importation of lumber, the first of which bore his name. The Robert Lewers was built in 1889 in Port Blakely, Bainbridge Island, Washington. She was based in San Francisco, California, and went aground at Vancouver Island, British Columbia, Canada, in 1923. The schooner Alice Cooke was named for the daughter of corporate partner Cooke. Sometime after 1926, the schooner was sold and eventually destroyed by fire.

In 1889, Lewers was one of the founding partners of the Oahu Railway and Land Company.

== Personal life ==
Lewers was a volunteer fireman, belonged to the Oʻahu Bethel Church, and shared his good fortune with others. His fraternal and civic memberships included the Freemasons, Oahu Country Club, the Odd Fellows and the Shriners.

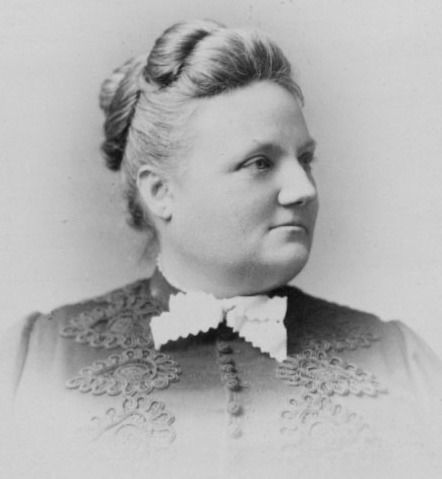
Catherine Rebecca Carter Lewers

He maintained social ties within the Hawaiian community, and every Christmas hosted a breakfast for them in his home. Not being part of any political affiliations, he played no part in the Overthrow of the Hawaiian Kingdom, and subsequent government changes. However, during a period of political upheaval when Hawaiians were barred from his neighborhood, Lewers had the Christmas breakfast delivered to them.

Lewers married Catherine Rebecca Carter on July 16, 1867. She was born February 24, 1844, in Honolulu, the only daughter of Massachusetts sea captain Joseph Oliver Carter (1802–1850) and his wife Hannah Trufant Lord (1809–1898). Brothers Joseph O. Carter (1835–1909), Henry A. P. Carter (1837–1891), Samuel Morrill Carter (1838–1893) and Frederick William Carter (1842–1860) were also born in Honolulu. Her brother Alfred Wellington Carter (1840–1890) was born aboard the ship Caliope off the coast of Tahiti.

Robert and Catherine had two children, William Henry Lewers and Harriett Layman Lewers. No individual invitations were sent for their 50th wedding anniversary celebration, in order for all who wanted to come to feel welcome. The resultant crowd was estimated in excess of 300 well-wishers. Catherine died December 31, 1924, just eight weeks after the November 3 death of her husband.

The two-story beach-front home he built for his family in 1883 was at the end of what is now Lewers Street in Waikiki, currently the location of the Halekulani hotel.

== Bibliography ==
- Staff (1920). Centenary Number, 1820–1920: Commemorating the Hundredth Anniversary of the Landing of the First American Missionaries in Hawaii. A Romance in Lumber: Honolulu Star-Bulletin, Limited.
- Carter, George Robert (1915). Joseph Oliver Carter: the founder of the Carter family in Hawaii, with a brief genealogy. Genealogical Committee of the Hawaiian Historical Society – via HathiTrust.
- White, Gary M. (2008). Hall Brothers Shipbuilders. Arcadia Publishing. ISBN 978-0-7385-5614-7.
- Kuykendall, Ralph Simpson (1967). The Hawaiian Kingdom 1874–1893, The Kalakaua Dynasty. Vol. 3. Honolulu: University of Hawaii Press. ISBN 978-0-87022-433-1. OCLC 500374815.
- US Treasury Dept (1894). Annual List of Merchant Vessels of the United States. U.S. Government Printing Office.
