= Grand Champions Polo Club =

Polo club in Wellington, Florida

Coordinates: 26°37′33″N 80°15′30″W

The Grand Champions Polo Club is a polo club in Wellington, Florida.

== Location ==
The club is located at 13444 Southfields Road in Wellington, Palm Beach County, Florida.

== History ==
The club was established by Marc Ganzi and his wife, Melissa Ganzi.

It hosts many polo tournaments every year. For example, in 2013, it hosted the USPA Fall Classic, the USPA Kay Colee Memorial, the US Trust Cup, the USPA Fall Plates, the Pedro Morrison Memorial, the Palm Restaurant Invitational, etc. Moreover, from 2010 to 2014, it hosted the annual International Gay Polo Tournament, organized by the Gay Polo League. On November 29, 2014, it hosted the North America Cup between Team USPA and Mexico.
