= Eugene J. de Sabla, Jr., Teahouse and Tea Garden =

Historic garden in California

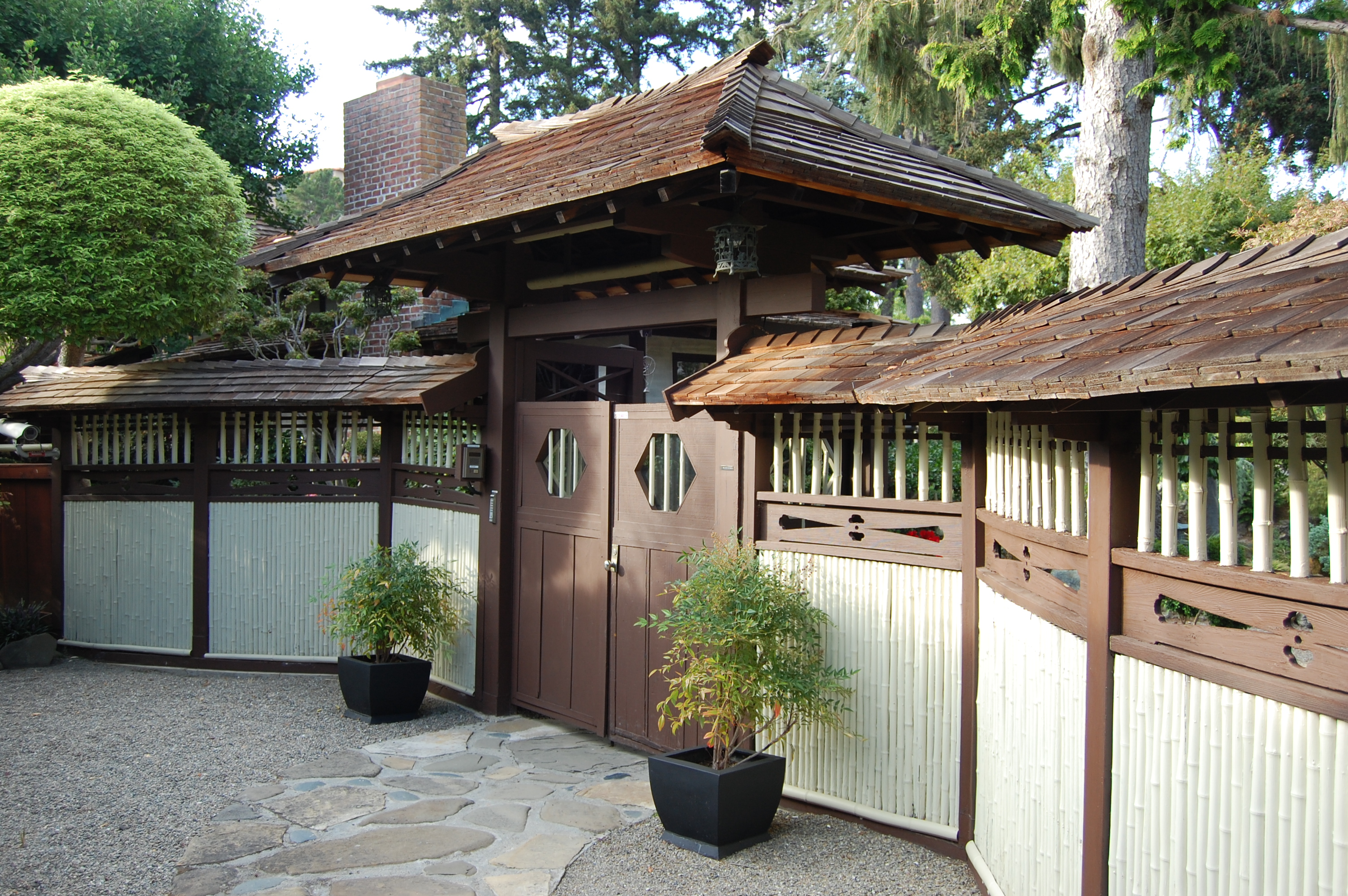
Entrance to the garden.

The Eugene J. de Sabla, Jr., Teahouse and Tea Garden is a historic garden located in San Mateo, bordering Hillsborough, California. It has been described as both a Higurashi-en and a Shin-style garden and is the only surviving private garden designed by the widely respected Japanese garden designer Makoto Hagiwara. It was built around 1907 on the El Cerrito estate and is listed in the National Register of Historic Places.

== Early history of the property ==
The El Cerrito estate, and eventually the tea garden on the property, passed through the hands of many notable California families and people throughout its history. The estate was originally owned by a rich merchant from San Mateo named William Davis Merry Howard in 1853. Howard gave the estate the name of El Cerrito, or Little Hill in Spanish. His wife, Agnes Poett, later inherited the property and brought gardener John McLaren to the estate. McLaren later gained fame by becoming the superintendent of San Francisco's Golden Gate Park after leaving the job at the Howard estate. While working at Golden Gate Park, he collaborated with Hagiwara, who is most known for building the Japanese Tea Garden that still survives in the park today. The garden was originally a part of the Japanese village at the California Midwinter Fair at the park in 1894. After Poett died in 1893, the property fell to her third husband, attorney Henry Pike Bowie. Bowie did not stay in the property after Poett's death though, he instead traveled to Japan and became an American expert on the country after returning to his homeland in 1902. Bowie developed some aspects of the tea garden on the property due to his Japanese influence, but the brunt of the development came when the property was owned by Eugene Joly de Sabla, Jr., who purchased it in 1906.

== Property under de Sabla ==
The de Sabla family allegedly descends from an exiled French noble whose family settled in Central America in the 1700s and involved themselves in politics and business there. Eugene J. de Sabla Jr. set out on his own entrepreneurial ventures, though, getting into the electric and gas power industry. He partnered with John Martin to form PG&E in 1905, a utilities giant that still powers much of California to this day. A year after the founding of PG&E, de Sabla purchased the El Cerrito estate. By 1907, high-class social events were already being hosted at the tea garden. The exact date of construction for the garden is unknown, but is thus estimated to be around 1907. The teahouse was constructed a couple years afterward. It is unknown exactly how de Sabla met Hagiwara, but a possible reason for Hagiwara's availability was that an anti-Asian clause in the city of San Francisco meant that Hagiwara left his role maintaining the Golden Gate Japanese Tea Garden and instead helped build many private Japanese-style tea gardens all over northern California. Of those, the de Sabla property is the only one that still stands, adding to its notability. Hagiwara was able to acquire these gigs because the Midwinter Fair he helped organize in 1894 made Japanese-style gardens a trend in the region while the Victorian style of gardens fell out of style. After the garden was constructed, local social events were regularly hosted in its confines, even after de Sabla sold the property to another wealthy socialite family, the St. Cyr clan, in 1919.

== Post de Sabla history ==
The St. Cyr family owned the property until 1940, hosting many locally notable social events within it during their ownership of the property. Eventually, they sold the estate to a local builder and developer who auctioned off the contents of the manor and then divided the estate into residential areas. This is something that happened to most large estates of the area at the time. The real estate developer, David Bohannon, did not turn the garden area into a residential lot though, looking to sell it instead. One potential buyer was Shirley Temple, but she did not finalize. Instead, Eri Richardson, an army veteran, bought it in 1946. Richardson was primarily a home developer, and after researching Japanese architecture he made some additions to the garden and then sold it again in 1949. Since then, the property has been sold several times, with many of its owners offering house and garden tours to the public. In 1992, the property was added to the National Register of Historic Places, following a restoration of the historic garden.

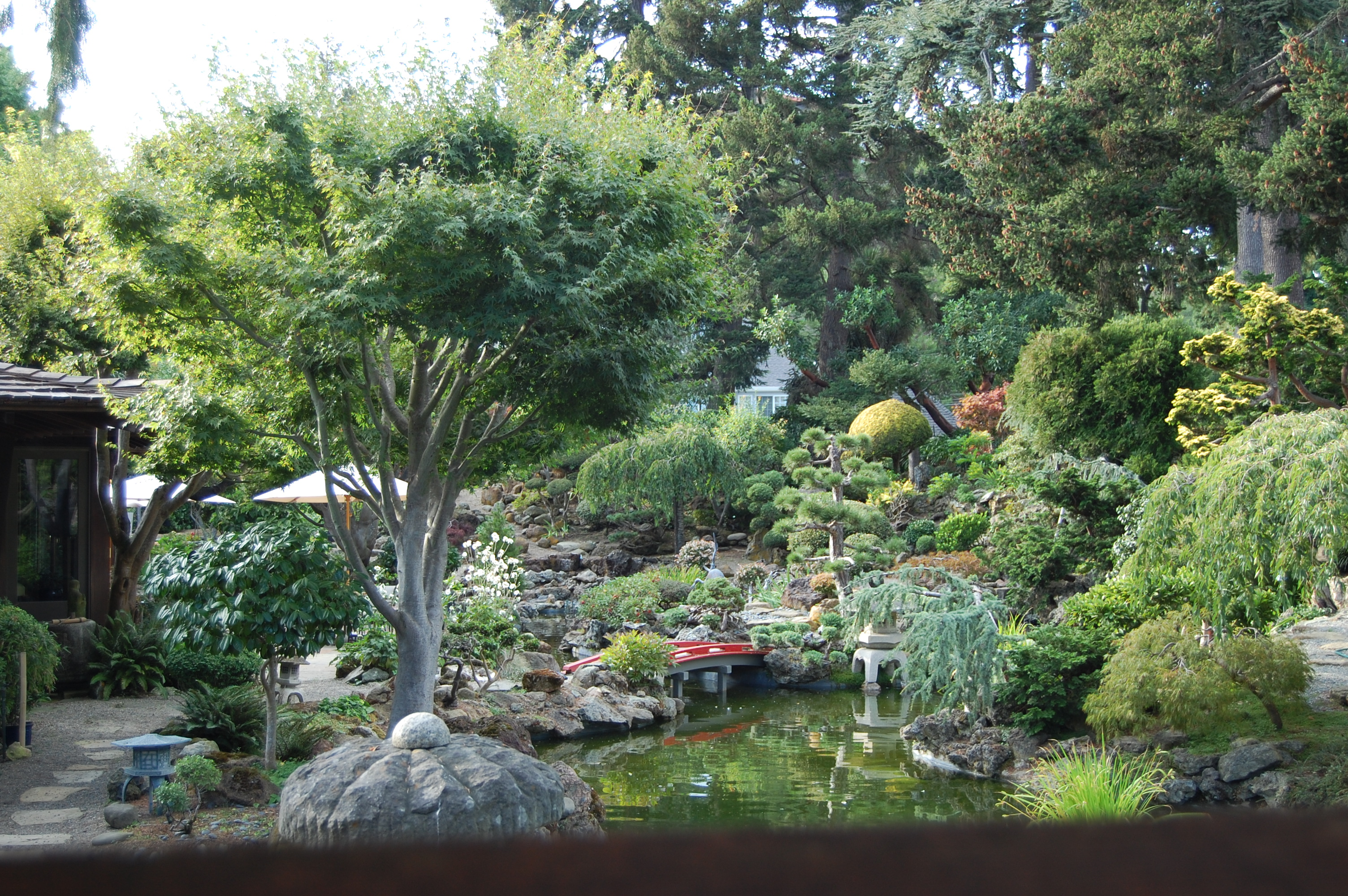
A view of the garden.

== Layout ==
The tea garden itself has been described as both a Higurashi-en, which is translated into "a garden worthy of a day of contemplation" and a Shin-style hill garden. The garden is almost one acre, in an estate that was once 35 acres when de Sabla bought it. A variety of trees surround the garden, many of which McLaren planted when he worked on the estate. It additionally includes a small, man-made mountain made partly of volcanic Japanese rock from which a stream flows out of and into a waterfall and a lake filled with Koi. The garden also includes lanterns, a Buddha statue, a bridge, a tsukubai, and more. Tiny electric lights illuminate the garden at night and a bamboo fence with a roofed entrance surrounds the entire estate. The teahouse is on the West side of the garden. It was eventually turned into a large full residence adding a guest house and garage in the corner of the garden. The teahouse itself is one story high, with shoji screen doors and plaster walls with wood beams. A scroll, incense, and flower arrangements are displayed inside of the teahouse.

== See also ==
- Japanese architecture
- San Francisco
