= Albert Richard Pritchard =

American businessman

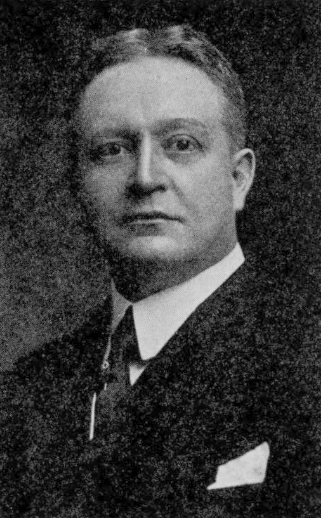
- Born: March 12, 1863; Rochester, New York, US
- Died: July 8, 1927 (aged 64); Lynn, Massachusetts, US
- Burial place: Mount Auburn Cemetery
- Education: Yale University
- Occupation: Businessman
- Spouses: Harriet E. Hare (m. 1889; died 1907) Pauline Harriette Lyon (m. 1907)

Albert Richard Pritchard (March 12, 1863 – July 8, 1927) was a businessman in Rochester, New York. He was engaged in the manufacture of stamped metal products.

== Early life and education ==
He was born at Rochester, March 12, 1863, the son of Alfred Richard and Mary Burroughs (Servoss) Pritchard, and always resided there. He prepared for college at Exeter, and entered the Class of '87 at Harvard, but changed to Yale in sophomore year.

== Career ==
After graduation Pritchard founded the Rochester Stamping Company, manufacturers of household metal goods, and was treasurer and manager of the company until 1905. He then sold his interest in the company and established the Pritchard-Strong Company.

In 1909 he became the general manager of the Lisk Manufacturing Company, of Canandaigua, New York and the Reed Manufacturing Company of Newark, New York. He served as president and manager until 1912.

Also in 1909, his partner Henry G. Strong left Pritchard-Strong, and the company was renamed The Pritchard Stamping Company. He served as President of Pritchard Stamping until it went out of business in 1919. In 1920 he founded The Pritchard Storage & Warehouse Company and served as its President until 1926.

He was director of the German-American Bank of Rochester from 1900-1905; Trustee of University of Rochester and of Rochester Theological Seminary from 1896-1910 and a member of the First Baptist Church, Rochester.

== Personal life ==
Pritchard married Harriet E. Hare on April 23, 1889, in Geneseo, New York. Mrs Pritchard died February 5, 1907. Pritchard married Pauline Harriette Lyon (née Putnam) on September 3, 1907, in Chicago, Illinois. There were no children by either marriage. He died July 8, 1927, in Lynn, Massachusetts, and was buried in Mount Auburn Cemetery, Cambridge, Massachusetts.
