= Hattie M. Strong =

American philanthropist (1864–1950)

Hattie Maria Corrin Strong
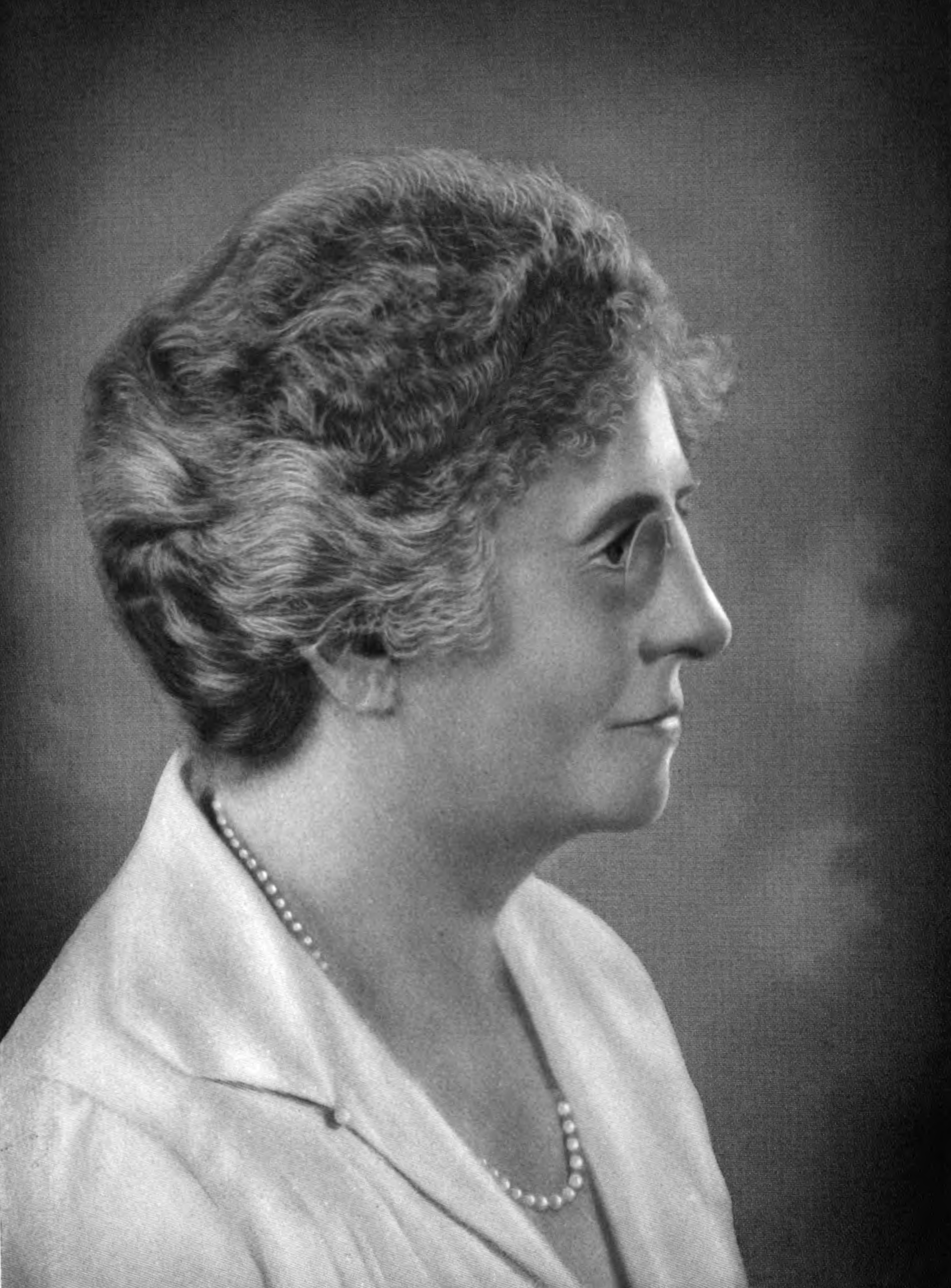
- Born: Hattie Maria Corrin; October 24, 1864; South Coventry, Connecticut, U.S.
- Died: June 6, 1950 (aged 85); Winston-Salem, North Carolina, U.S.
- Occupation: Philanthropist
- Years active: 1908–1950
- Spouses: Lester B. Lockwood (m. 1888; div. 1897) Henry A. Strong (m. 1905; died 1919)

Hattie Maria Strong (1864–1950) was an American philanthropist who funded the building of hospitals, educational institutions, and social service agencies throughout Africa, Asia, Europe, and the United States. She was awarded the French Legion of Honor after establishing in 1927 a retreat near Paris for soldiers wounded during World War I.

== Personal life ==
Hattie Marie Corrin was born on October 24, 1864, in South Coventry, Connecticut. She and her family enjoyed a luxurious lifestyle, until the business recession of 1877 and the subsequent death of her father a few years later. After that, her family had to move in with their relatives and she began offering piano lessons as a way of earning income.

In 1888 she married Lester B. Lockwood and moved with him to Tacoma. She gave birth to her only child, Lester Corrin, in 1892. In 1897 she divorced Lockwood after he had abandoned her. She was left with limited financial resources.

During the Klondike Gold Rush, Strong travelled with her son and a friend, who was a nurse, to establish a hospital for sick and injured miners. The ship they were on, carrying construction and medical supplies, wrecked. While stranded in Skagway, Strong worked as a nurse before moving to Southern California.

She married Henry A. Strong, co-founder and first president of Kodak Eastman in 1905.

== Philanthropic work ==
Beginning in 1908–1909, with the funding of the Strong Academy at Shiloh Orphanage in Augusta, Georgia, Strong's philanthropy focused heavily on funding buildings.

Strong funded the construction of buildings around the world at educational and medical institutions and many are named after her—either using her married name of Strong or her maiden name of Corrin—at Peking University in China, Rollins College in Florida, the University of Rochester in New York, George Washington University in Washington D.C., and Salem College in North Carolina. She also funded the YWCAs in Rochester and Washington D.C.

The Hattie M. Strong Residence Hall at George Washington University is listed on the National Register of Historic Places. The hall was the first women's residence hall built on the campus.

Strong gained the name "Mother Strong" through her relationship and philanthropy with Rollins College in Winter Park, FL. Strong Hall at Rollins College was completed in 1939 at Rollins and was slated for a complete renovation in 2018.

At Salem College, Strong funded the Corrin Refectory and the Strong Honors House, which is available for first-year students and upper-class students in the honors program. The dormitory building houses up to 34 students in double rooms in the two-story building. It was designed to Strong's specifications to include living quarters for her on the first floor, where she lived until her death.

== Legacy ==
The Hattie M. Strong Foundation began running a student loan program in 1928. Loans are zero interest and offer flexible repayment schedules that can be adjusted to students' economic needs. In 2009, the foundation began a scholarship program instead of a loan program. The program is specifically aimed toward students pursuing a teacher's licensure and is currently available to students attending twenty-four colleges and universities in Maryland, Virginia, North Carolina and Washington, D.C. The scholarships are offered to students during the semester that they are conducting student teaching, in order to reduce the financial strain of full-time teaching while still students.

Her official papers are collected at the Salem College library and archives in Winston-Salem, N.C. The Hattie Strong Collection includes items such as photographs, scrapbooks, diaries, and personal correspondence. The items are a cumulation of items already held by Salem College and items donated by the Hattie Strong Foundation.

== Death ==
Strong died in Winston-Salem, North Carolina on June 6, 1950. She is buried in Rochester, N.Y.
