= Hawaiian Kingdom–United States relations =

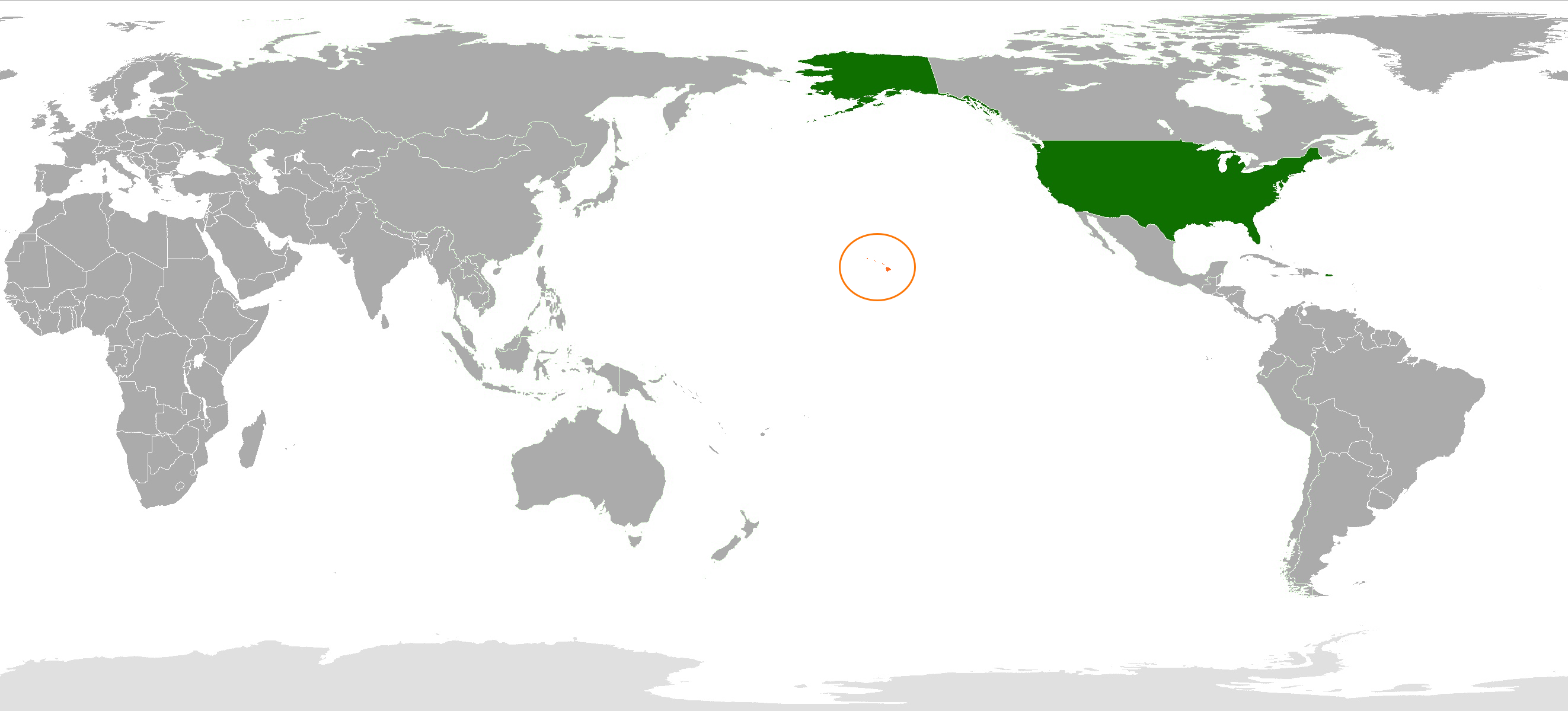

- United States: Hawaii

Hawaiian Kingdom–United States relations refers to the historical relationship between the independent Hawaiian Kingdom and the United States. Relations included several treaties and exchanges of trade and diplomatic representatives from 1820 to 1893.

== History ==
While American missionaries and businessmen had settled as residents in the Hawaiian Kingdom since 1820, relations with the United States developed slowly, beginning in 1826, when the first treaty between the two countries was signed by Captain Thomas ap Catesby Jones and Kuhina Nui Kaʻahumanu.

However, US recognition of Hawaii's government was suspended following the 1843 Paulet Affair, after which the United Kingdom and France announced their recognition of the Hawaiian Kingdom. Recognition was restored in 1849, when the United States and the Kingdom signed a treaty that established relations between the two countries. This treaty was signed one year after the US has expanded its territorial base to the Pacific coast of North America, making the two countries "neighbors".

The first United States Minister to Hawaii (diplomatic rank roughly equivalent to a modern Ambassador) was David L. Gregg, who became minister to Hawaii in 1853. A commercial agent (called Consul starting in 1844) had served in the islands since 1820.

From November 1874 to February 1875, King Kalākaua made a state visit to the United States. This was the first time that any foreign head of state or head of government had visited the United States. Kalākaua visited the United States again in 1881 as part of his world tour.

Further treaties were signed between the United States and Hawaii, including the Reciprocity Treaty of 1875. Relations between the two countries were aggravated following the 1893 Overthrow of the Hawaiian Kingdom, in which then-Minister John L. Stevens had participated; he was accused of inappropriate conduct by the Blount Report, and was forced into retirement by the United States government that same year. After the Republic of Hawaii was proclaimed, a new minister, James Henderson Blount, was sent to the country to investigate the overthrow of the monarchy. After Blount issued his report, he was succeeded by Albert Sydney Willis, who convinced the deposed queen to grant an amnesty to the instigators of the coup, and then demanded that the Provisional Government turn power back to the monarchy. This was refused by Sanford B. Dole.

== Diplomats from the kingdom to the US ==
Diplomatic representation in Washington, DC in the kingdom was through a series of ad hoc envoys, and a post roughly equivalent to the current diplomatic rank of Ambassador of full-time Minister to the United States.

- William Richards 1842
- James Jackson Jarves 1849
- William Little Lee 1855–1856
- Elisha Hunt Allen 1856–1883
- Henry A. P. Carter 1883–1891
- John Mott-Smith 1891–1893

== See also ==
- United States Minister to Hawaii
- List of bilateral treaties signed by the Hawaiian Kingdom
- Hawaii–Tahiti relations
- Legal status of Hawaii
