= Hawaii–Tahiti relations =

Hawaiian–Tahitian relations

- Hawaii: Tahiti

Hawaiʻi–Tahiti relations refers to the historical relationship between the independent Kingdom of Hawaiʻi and the Kingdom of Tahiti. Relations included one treaty, proposed marriage alliances and exchanges of trade and diplomatic representatives from the early 1800s to 1880.

== History ==
According to oral traditions the second migration of Polynesians to the Hawaiian Islands came from a place to the south called Kahiki, which is often identified as Tahiti. This second migration allegedly replaced some of the older Marquesan settlers and formed the new aliʻi social class. Communication between the two regions ceased for more than 500 years before the arrival of Captain James Cook, who was already famous for exploring the Pacific islands, including Tahiti. Cook and his crew noted the similarity between the Tahitian and Hawaiian languages; many of his crewmen were able to communicate with the Hawaiians. Some of the first Tahitians came to Hawaii aboard foreign vessels as sailors or translators. In 1804, British Captain John Turnbull took a Tahitian couple to Kauaʻi. Tahitian missionaries led by William Ellis from the London Missionary Society arrived to assist the American missionaries in Hawaiʻi.

A few years before 1804, King Kaumualiʻi of Kauaʻi had sent an envoy to Tahiti to select a wife suitable for his lineage and position, and to forge an alliance with the Tahitians in the event of any attempt by King Kamehameha I to invade Kauaʻi. The envoy settled in Tahiti and never returned to Kauaʻi. Before his kidnapping by Queen Kaʻahumanu in 1819, Kaumualiʻi had planned a voyage to Tahiti with Reverend Hiram Bingham I for the purpose of exploring the possibilities for trade and missionaries there.

Using western weaponry, native rulers on both Hawaiʻi Island and Tahiti were able to consolidate their power and defeat rival chiefs. Kamehameha I united all eight islands of Hawaiʻi by 1810 and Pōmare I united the island of Tahiti along with Moʻorea, Tetiʻaroa, and Mehetiʻa although he was never able to conquer Maiʻao and the Leeward Islands, which remained independent and ruled by three separate kingdoms. There were some instances of correspondence between the Kamehameha Dynasty and the Pōmare Dynasty.

The two kings proposed a double marriage alliance in which a daughter of each would be married to a son of the other. Kekāuluohi was chosen for this but with the death of Pōmare, plans for a match collapsed.

Both the rulers of Tahiti and Hawaiʻi adhered to the Protestant faith and did not hesitate in persecuting native Catholics and deporting Catholic missionaries—in the case of Tahiti, Queen Pōmare denied such doings—which resulted in conflict with France, the dominant Catholic power during the 1800s. Hawaiʻi was able to escape colonialism by gaining the recognition of France, Great Britain, and the United States while Tahiti was not so fortunate. In 1842, Queen Pōmare IV was forced to accept a French protectorate over her kingdom and in 1843, French troops were landed in the islands by Admiral Abel Aubert du Petit-Thouars in the Franco-Tahitian War (1844–1847). This effectively placed Tahiti under French control and rendered the queen a puppet ruler. Queen Pōmare wrote to King Kamehameha III:

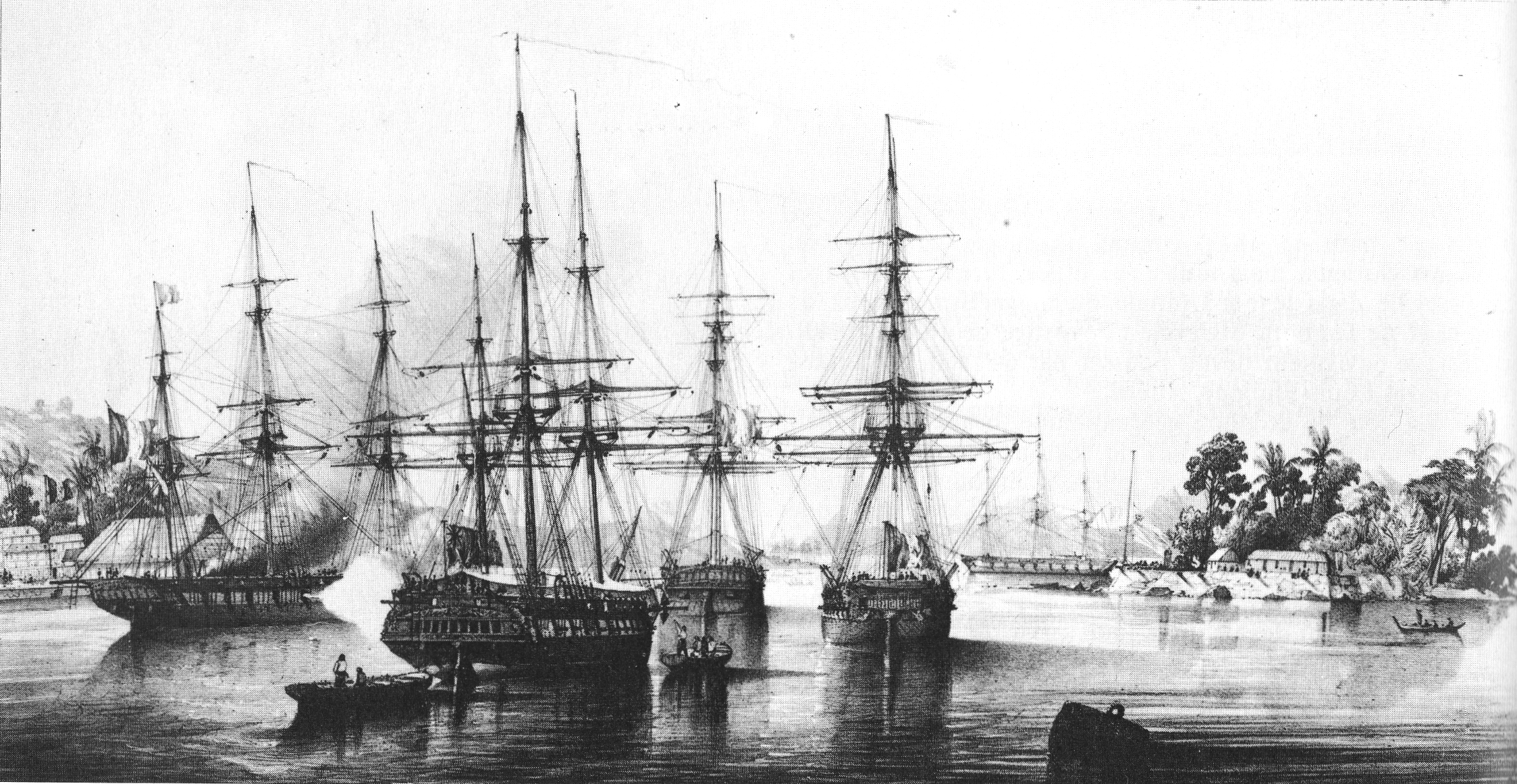
French Navy Capitaine Abel Aubert du Petit-Thouars taking over Tahiti on September 9, 1842

O King of the Sandwich Islands, may you be saved by the true God!
This is my word to you. In a certain newspaper, printed and circulated at Honolulu, called the Polynesian, there are made known to all men some false statements, spoken by Frenchmen and those who agree with them.
I write this little word to you to tell you to undo the wrong and injury done to me, your sister, Queen of the Islands of the South, and tell the editor and printer to print in the Polynesian this word, the copy of a letter that I have written to the King of the French, and which makes known the truth, and the truth only.
Beware of the Roman Catholics and the friends of the Roman Catholics.
POMARE
Encampment of Vaioau, Island of Raiatea, this twenty-fifth of September, 1844.
The foregoing is a true translation, and I am witness of Queen Pōmare's signature.

GEO. [George] PLATT.

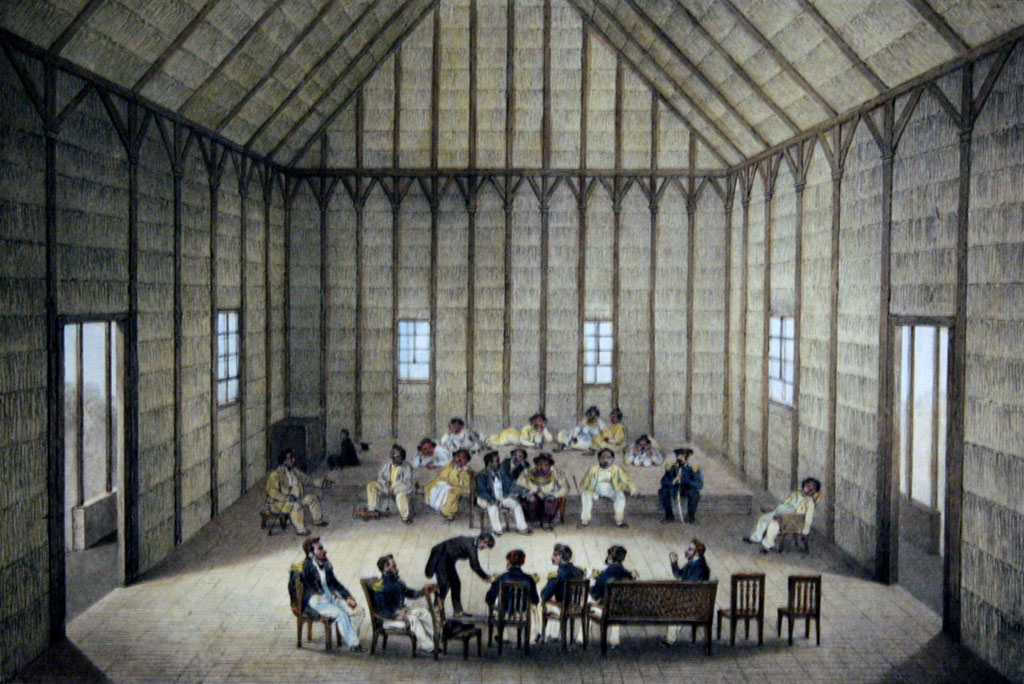
Meeting between Abel Aubert du Petit-Thouars and Hawaiians in July 1837

Hawaiians, who were sympathetic to the Tahitian Queen, were horrified at the situation in Tahiti, knowing Hawaiʻi was as susceptible—if not more so—to European colonial aggression in the Pacific. The Hawaiians were especially fearful of the French. The French admiral Dupetit Thouars, who had invaded Tahiti, landed in Hawaiʻi a decade before in 1837 aboard the French frigate La Venus and had demanded the Premier Kaʻahumanu II and the young King Kamehameha III stop persecuting the French Catholic missionaries; at that time Dupetit Thouars was captain of an exploring expedition and didn't have the power or men to put any pressure on the Hawaiians. The demands were ignored and the anti-French stance of the government continued until the 1839 Laplace Affair that forced the Hawaiian government to pay $20,000 in compensation and acknowledge the rights of Catholics in their realm with the Edict of Toleration. Western pressure on Hawaiʻi continued with the 1843 Paulet Affair involving the British and the threat of annexation was ever present.

From the palace of Honolulu, Kamehameha III wrote back to her on February 4, 1845:

To Queen Pomare,

Aliʻi of Tahiti
Respectful greetings to you.
I received your letter on the 25th day of September with a copy of your petition to the Christian King, Louis Phillippe, the King of France. As soon as I received it I quickly ordered these documents to be published in the Polynesian, in accordance with your idea that the people of this land should hear of it.
I have frequently heard of your troubles and of the death of your Government and of your grief, but I don't have the power [mana] within me to help you. At one time, however, I thought of fetching you, and of bringing you to live here in Hawaiʻi with us, but upon reflection I hesitate lest you soon become a refugee from your own country. Therefore I have put aside my thoughts to invite you to come here. Perhaps this latter thought is right [pono] because I have heard things may be right again. Perhaps it is better for you to rely upon the generosity of the King of France, in order that you might not prejudice your petition that seeks redress and affection from him.
Just before this, I had a problem similar to yours, although yours is the graver situation. God was truly generous to me, and my Government emerged victorious at this time. In my time of trouble certain people stood by my side to aid me. I had a foreigner haole who had sworn an oath before me, to have no other Sovereign but myself, and he worked with vigor as is the foreigner's way, quickly deciding what was for our good and what should be done. There were other foreigners also, and including my man, T. Haʻalilio. They were in Britain and in France. As soon as they heard of the events here in Hawaiʻi, they quickly petitioned the British Government in order to ascertain if their approval had been given. Here I reign with the support of some righteous foreigners and I think therein my Government shall endure in times when I am again troubled by foreign governments. My own people and those from foreign lands are equally protected under me. I reign in peace. I am not too frequently bothered by very burdensome tasks, but it is my duty to observe and supervise all the work that my Officers do.
Please be generous to my Hawaiian people that travel to your land, as I am generous to your people of Tahiti. Indeed, as I generously care for your people that come here to Hawaiʻi
Oh Sovereign, I deeply regret your trouble. May the Lord that is our Savior liberate you. May you be blessed through the Sacrifice of salvation.
Fond farewell,

Kamehameha III.

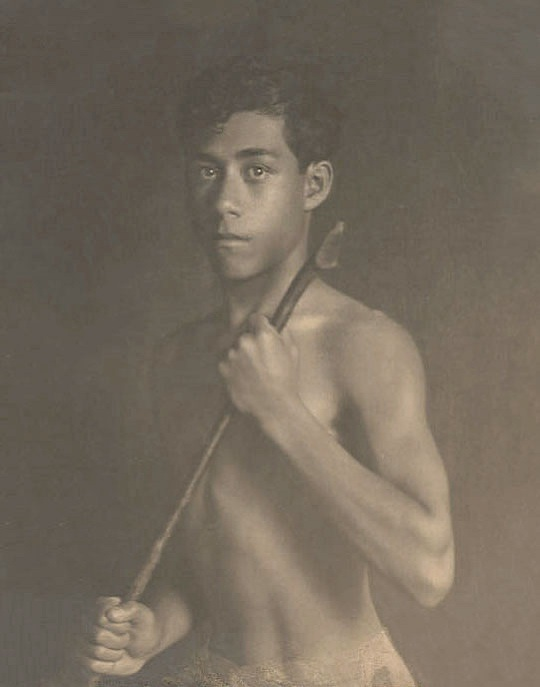
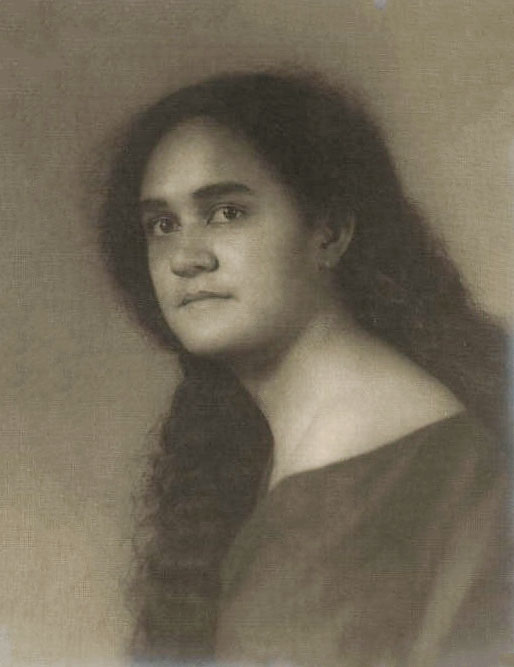
Photograph of young Tahitian-Hawaiian boy and girl, 1909

The French Admiral De Tromelin invaded Honolulu in 1849, causing $100,000 in damage and took the king's yacht, Kamehameha III, which was sailed to Tahiti. Hawaiʻi escaped French annexation because the balance of American, British, and French interests in the islands made it impossible for any of the three nations to annex the islands.

In 1849, Tahitian Princess Ninito Teraʻiapo accompanied by her cousins—all nieces of Queen Pōmare IV—arrived in Honolulu from Tahiti as guests of De Tromelin. She was betrothed to Prince Moses Kekūāiwa but arrived to news of his death and she married John Kapilikea Sumner. Ninito returned to Tahiti with her husband, who served as Hawaiian consul to Tahiti for a number of years.

On November 24, 1853, Tahiti and Hawaiʻi signed a postal treaty that set postage rates in both kingdoms at 5¢ per 0.5 oz (14 grams). This was the only formal diplomatic treaty between the two countries.

Hawaiʻi maintained a consul in the Tahitian capital Papeʻetē; this representation continued after the French annexation of Tahiti in 1880, but as a diplomatic gesture to France and its colonies rather than to the former relationship between Tahiti and Hawaiʻi.

King Pōmare V planned to visit Honolulu in August 1882 but this planned trip never occurred. In response, King Kalākaua also planned to visit Tahiti in late 1887 to renew Hawaiʻi's connection with the Tahitian royal family as part of his aim at forming a Polynesian confederation. Pōmare V asked the French government to create a Tahitian Royal Order of Pōmare V so he could reciprocate the Hawaiian decorations he anticipated to receive from Kalākaua on the planned visit. This request was refused. On July 6, 1887, Kalākaua was forced to sign the Bayonet Constitution. To avoid the criticism of his political opponents in his cabinet, Kalākaua canceled the Tahitian trip.

== Diplomats from Hawaiʻi to Tahiti ==
Diplomatic representation in Papeʻetē, Tahiti, was through a series of ad-hoc envoys and a post roughly equivalent to the current diplomatic rank of Ambassador of Consuls to Tahiti. Records of Consuls prior to the 1880s are scant.

- John K. Sumner, 1883–1885
- vacant, 1886
- Joseph T. Cognet, 1888–1890
- A. F. Bonet, 1891–1893

== Huahine ==
Flag of Huahine

King Kamehameha II had a brief correspondence with Mahine Teheiʻura, King of Huahine, one of the three independent kingdoms in the windward side of the Society Islands, which was linguistically and culturally tied to Tahiti. Here is a translation of one of the first Hawaiian letters ever written:

Hawaii, August 16, 1822

Mahine:
I will now make a communication to you. I have compassion towards you on account of your son's dying. My love to you with all the chiefs of all your islands. I now serve the God of you and of us. We are now learning to read and write. When I shall become skillful in learning I will then go and see you. May you be saved by Jesus Christ.

Liholiho Kamehameha II.

== See also ==
- Polynesian confederation
- Hawaiian Kingdom–United States relations
- List of bilateral treaties signed by the Hawaiian Kingdom

== Bibliography ==
- Anderson, Gerald H. (1999). Biographical Dictionary of Christian Missions. Grand Rapids: Wm. B. Eerdmans Publishing. ISBN 978-0-8028-4680-8. OCLC 1004925339.
- Banner, Stuart (2007). Possessing the Pacific. Cambridge, MA: Harvard University Press. ISBN 978-0-674-02052-8. OCLC 1027492022.
- Barrere, Dorothy (1989). "Tahitian in the History of Hawai'i: the Journal of Kahikona". Hawaiian Journal of History. 23. Honolulu: Hawaiian Historical Society: 75–107. hdl:10524/426.
- Buck, Elizabeth (2010). Paradise Remade: The Politics of Culture and History in Hawai'i. Philadelphia: Temple University Press. ISBN 978-1-4399-0608-8. OCLC 1124320382.
- Deering, Mabel Clare Craft (1899). "How Royalty is Buried". Hawaii Nei. San Francisco: W. Doxey. pp. 101–108. OCLC 1620719.
- Forbes, David W., ed. (2000). Hawaiian National Bibliography 1780–1900, Volume 2: 1831–1850. Vol. 2. Honolulu: University of Hawaii Press. ISBN 978-0-8248-2379-5. OCLC 123279964.
- Gonschor, Lorenz Rudolf (August 2008). Law as a Tool of Oppression and Liberation: Institutional Histories and Perspectives on Political Independence in Hawaiʻi, Tahiti Nui/French Polynesia and Rapa Nui (PDF) (MA thesis). Honolulu: University of Hawaii at Manoa. hdl:10125/20375. OCLC 798846333. Archived from the original (PDF) on January 2, 2020.
- Gonschor, Lorenz (2019). A Power in the World: The Hawaiian Kingdom in Oceania. Honolulu: University of Hawaii Press. ISBN 978-0-8248-8001-9. OCLC 1056198239.
- Gulick, Orramel Hinckley; Gulick, Ann Eliza Clark (1918). The Pilgrims of Hawaii: Their Own Story of Their Pilgrimage from New England and Life Work in the Sandwich Islands, Now Known as Hawaii. New York, Chicago: Fleming H. Revell Company. OCLC 752322844.
- Jarves, James Jackson (1843). History of the Hawaiian Islands. Boston: Tappan and Dennet. OCLC 10163451.
- Joesting, Edward (1984). Kauai: The Separate Kingdom. Honolulu: University of Hawaii Press. ISBN 978-0-8248-0943-0. OCLC 10998717.
- Judd, Henry P. (1937). "Great Britain and France in the Society Islands". Forty-Fifth Annual Report of the Hawaiian Historical Society for the Year 1936. Honolulu: Hawaiian Historical Society: 53–65. hdl:10524/69.
- Kamehiro, Stacy L. (2009). The Arts of Kingship: Hawaiian Art and National Culture of the Kalākaua Era. Honolulu: University of Hawaii Press. ISBN 978-0-8248-3263-6. OCLC 663885792.
- Kuykendall, Ralph Simpson (1965) [1938]. The Hawaiian Kingdom 1778–1854, Foundation and Transformation. Vol. 1. Honolulu: University of Hawaii Press. ISBN 978-0-87022-431-7. OCLC 47008868.
- Hawaiian Kingdom (1875). Treaties and Conventions Concluded Between the Hawaiian Kingdom and Other Powers, Since 1825. Honolulu: Pacific Commercial Advertiser Print. OCLC 11200324.
- Polk, Josiah F., ed. (April 1846). "Queen Pōmare's Manifesto". The Investigator, and Advocate of Independence. Vol. II, no. 4. Washington, DC: Printed by James N. Davis. pp. 110–120. OCLC 52810305.
- Schütz, Albert J. (1994). The Voices of Eden: A History of Hawaiian Language Studies. Honolulu: University of Hawaii Press. ISBN 978-0-8248-1637-7. OCLC 31011735.
- Schweizer, Niklaus Rudolf (2005). Turning Tide: The Ebb and Flow of Hawaiian Nationality. Bern: Peter Lang. ISBN 978-0-8204-7030-6. OCLC 150066482.
- Taylor, A. P. (1929). Ford, Alexander Hume (ed.). "Niniko, 'Garden of Rest'". The Mid-Pacific Magazine. 37 (5). T. H., A. H. Ford; Pan-Pacific Union, Pan-Pacific Research Institution: 433–440.
- Topolinski, John Renken Kahaʻi (1981). "Nancy Sumner, Hawaiian Courtlady". Hawaiian Journal of History. 15. Honolulu: Hawaiian Historical Society: 50–58. hdl:10524/285.
