= Empire Polo Club =

Polo club in Indio, California

Coordinates: 33.679811°N 116.237256°W

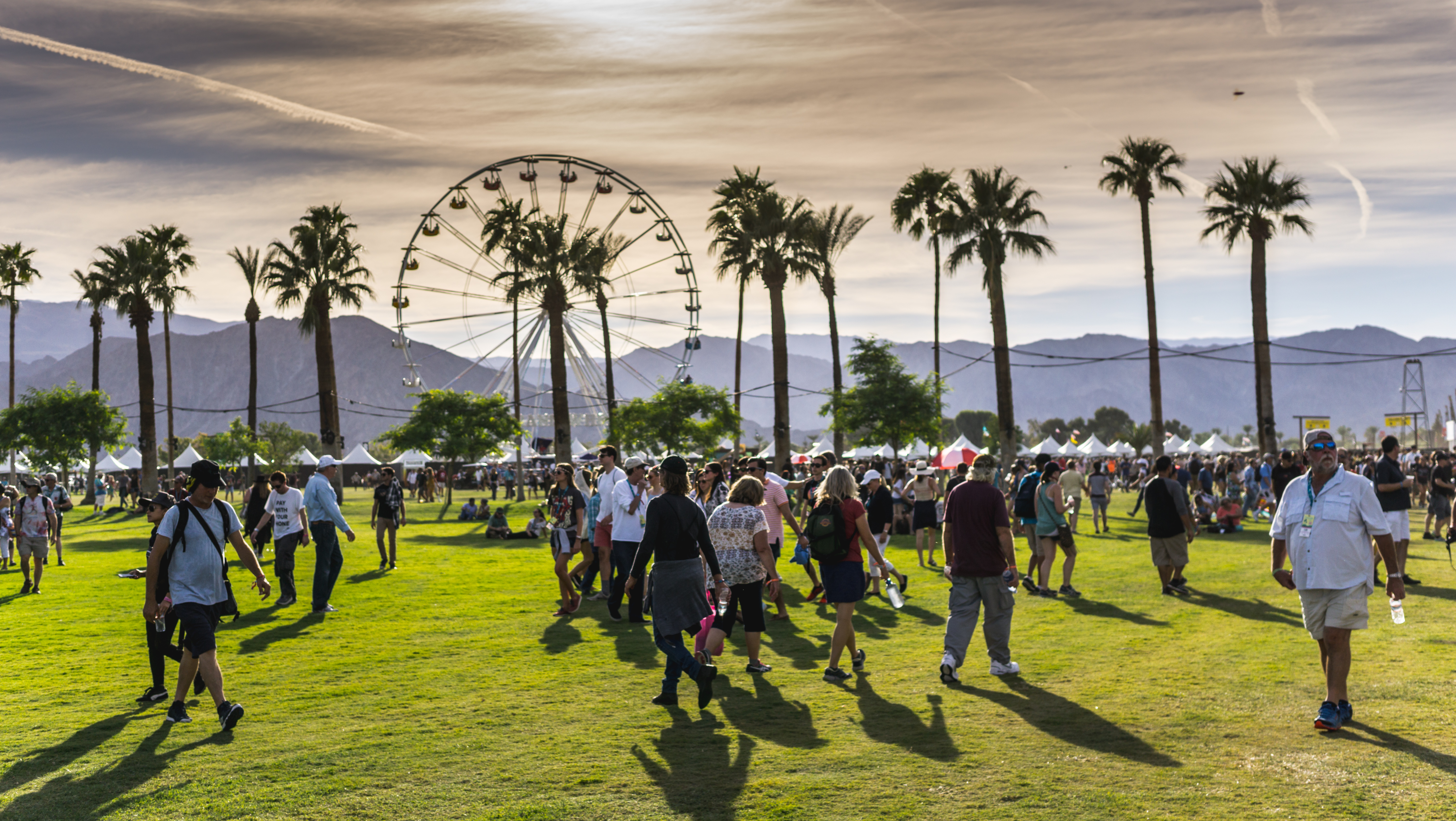
The Empire Polo Club, hosting the Desert Trip music festival in October 2016

The Empire Polo Club is a 1,000-acre event venue in Indio, California, located in the Coachella Valley of Riverside County, approximately 22 miles southeast of Palm Springs. It was founded in 1987 for use by polo players, hosting international polo tournaments. Since 1993, the grounds have been leased out for events, including the annual Coachella Valley Music and Arts Festival and Stagecoach Festival in April.

== Location ==
The club is located at 81-800 Avenue 51 within the city of Indio, in the Coachella Valley and Colorado Desert of Southern California. It is around a half hour drive from Palm Springs and a 2 to 2-and-a-half hour drive from downtown Los Angeles or San Diego.

== History ==
The club was founded in 1987. It has twelve polo grounds, making it one of the largest polo clubs on the West coast of the United States.

It hosts local, national and international matches and tournaments. In 2013, it hosted a match between the British Schools and Universities Polo Association (SUPA) and the USPA Intercollegiate/Interscholastic. It has also hosted events for the Gay Polo League. In 2015, it hosted the USPA Townsend International Challenge Cup.

The grounds are owned by Alex Haagen III. Since 1993, the Empire Polo Club has leased its polo grounds annually to Goldenvoice, a subsidiary of the Anschutz Entertainment Group, the organizers of the Coachella Valley Music and Arts Festival and the Stagecoach Festival. Goldenvoice signed a 28-year lease agreement in 2021 for full operational control of the Empire Polo Grounds amid plans to host more events. The polo fields were closed in November 2021 and the staff were laid off on short notice.

AEG began hosting a winter soccer tournament, named the Coachella Valley Invitational, in 2022. It is an annual preseason tournament for Major League Soccer and National Women's Soccer League teams that grew to 30,000 attendees by 2024.

In June 2025, the club proposed a mixed-use development near the festival grounds, including homes, shops, restaurants, and general entertainment.

=== Other events ===
In October and November 2009, the club hosted Phish's Festival 8. During the Halloween show that year, Phish performed the Rolling Stones' album Exile on Main Street in its entirety.

In October 2016, the club hosted Desert Trip, a music festival featuring legendary rock performers Bob Dylan, the Rolling Stones, Paul McCartney, Neil Young, Roger Waters, and The Who.

In October 2023, the Power Trip took place at the club, featuring Guns N' Roses, AC/DC, Judas Priest, Metallica, Iron Maiden, and Tool.
