= Menlo Polo Club =

Polo club in Atherton, California

The Menlo Polo Club is a historic polo club in Atherton, California. Founded in 1923, it organizes the annual Silicon Valley Polo Classic tournament.

== Location ==
The club is located at the Menlo Circus Club, 190 Park Lane, Atherton, California.

== History ==
It was founded in 1923. It is affiliated with the United States Polo Association (USPA). The polo grounds are with Bermuda grass. The club president is Lyn Jason Cobb. The club manager is Erik Wright.

The club organizes the annual Silicon Valley Polo Classic tournament. Since 2010, it has also hosted the ExpertQuote Ladies’ Cup. It has hosted events with the Gay Polo League.

The club has held philanthropic fundraisers for the Square Peg Foundation Community Riding Program in Half Moon Bay and the Lucile Packard Children's Hospital at Stanford University in Palo Alto.
