= Henry G. Strong =

American businessman

- Born: Henry Griffin Strong; July 18, 1873; Rochester, New York, US
- Died: August 13, 1919 (aged 46); Los Angeles, California, US
- Occupations: Businessman, Automotive
- Spouse: Millie Hoefler

Henry Griffin Strong (July 18, 1873 – August 13, 1919) was an American businessman from Rochester, New York. He was a partner in the Pritchard Strong Company, a manufacturer of stamped metal products. In 1910 he organized the Strong-Crittenden Company, sales agents for the Lozier, Pope-Hartford and White automobiles.

He was born on July 18, 1873, in Rochester, New York. The son of Henry A. Strong, president of the Eastman Kodak Company, and Helen (Griffin) Strong.

He was married March 5, 1895, to Miss Millie Hoefler, daughter of Charles Hoefler of Rochester, N. Y. They had two sons: Alvah Griffin (1900–1966), in New York City; and Pritchard Hopkins (1906–1937), in Rochester, New York.

Henry G. Strong died in Los Angeles, California on August 13, 1919, as a result of complications from influenza.
