= Will Rogers Polo Club =

Polo club in Pacific Palisades, Los Angeles, California

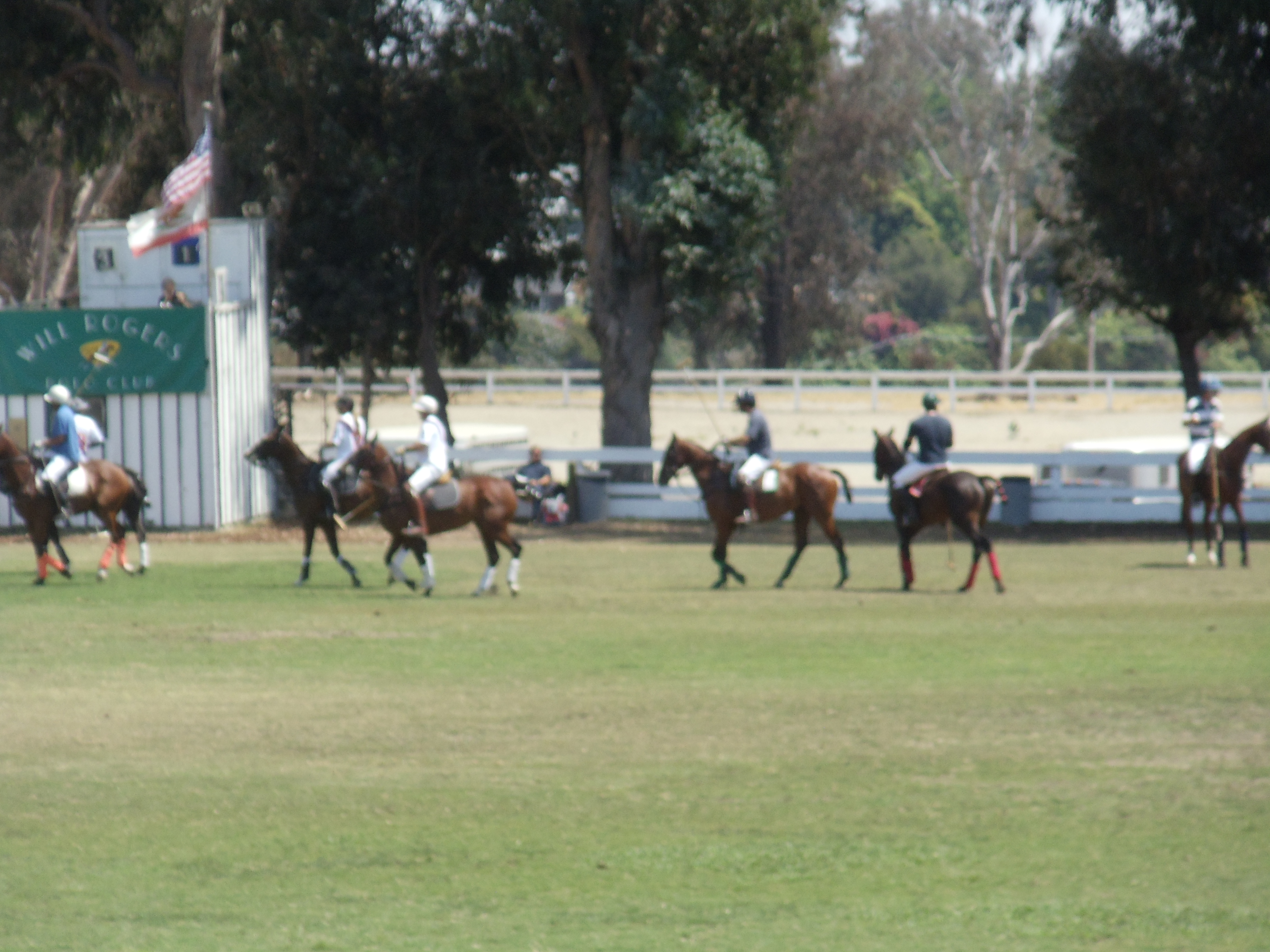
Match between the Will Rogers Polo Club and the Dallas Polo Club at the Will Rogers Polo Club on 29 June 2013.

The Will Rogers Polo Club is a polo club in Pacific Palisades, Los Angeles, California. It is located within Will Rogers State Historic Park.

== Location ==
It is located at 1501 Will Rogers State Park Road, Pacific Palisades, Los Angeles, California.

== History ==
The original polo field was designed by Will Rogers (1879-1935) on his ranch before he even designed his house in the 1930s. Early players were friends of Rogers, including David Niven (1910–1983), Spencer Tracy (1900–1967), Hal Roach (1892–1992), Walt Disney (1901–1966), Clark Gable (1901–1960), and Robert Montgomery (1904-1981).

In 1953, amateur polo player C.D. LeBlanc started the Will Rogers Polo Club. As such, it became the thirteenth oldest polo club in the United States.

In 2012, then-mayoral candidate (now former Mayor) Eric Garcetti threw the ball for the 59th Annual C.D. LeBlanc Tournament.

== Matches ==
Polo matches are played every weekend from April through September. Significant matches include the Annual Ronald Reagan Tournament, the Celebrity Ranch Cup, the Annual C.D. LeBlanc Memorial Tournament, the Farah Cup Challenge, the Dog Iron Polo Cup, Chukkers for Charity, the Annual Hector Sustaita Memorial Tournament, the Annual Will Rogers Memorial Tournament, and the Annual Will Roger's Women's Challenge.

== Charity ==
Philanthropic endeavors supported by the club include Safety Harbor Kids and the Promises Foundation.
