= Henry A. P. Carter =

American politician

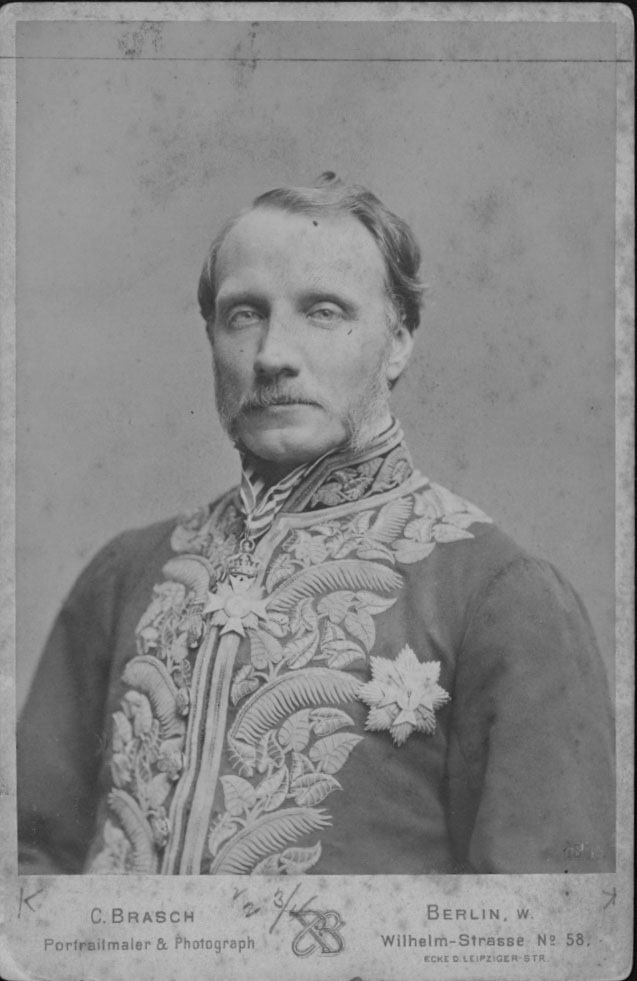

Personal details
- Born: Henry Alpheus Peirce Carter; August 7, 1837 Honolulu, Hawaiian Kingdom
- Died: November 1, 1891 (aged 54) New York City
- Spouse: Sybil Augusta Judd
- Children: 7, including George
- Occupation: Businessman, diplomat

Henry Alpheus Peirce Carter, also known as Henry Augustus Peirce Carter (August 7, 1837 – November 1, 1891), was an American businessman, politician, and diplomat in the Kingdom of Hawaii.

== Family life ==
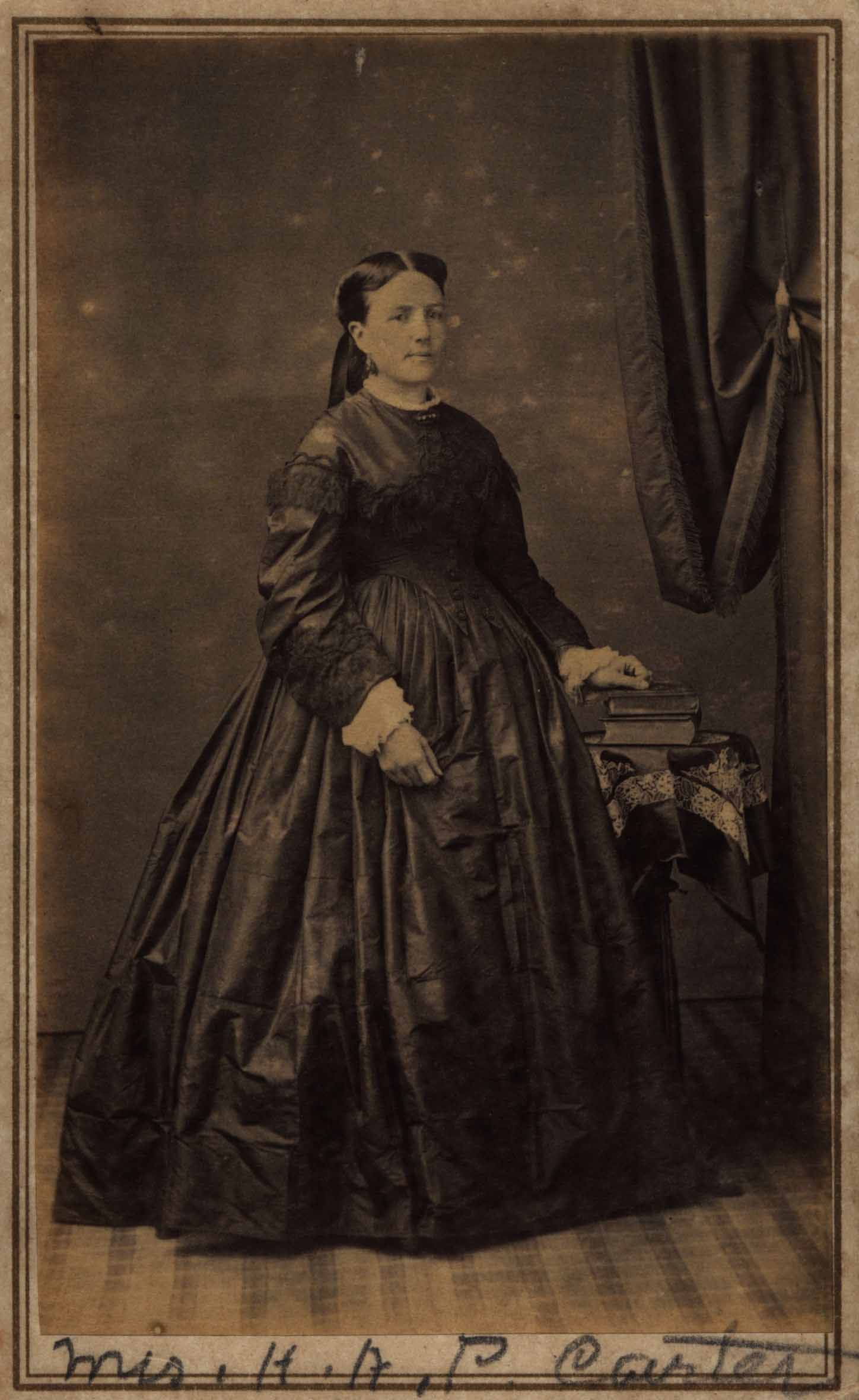
Sybil Augusta Judd Carter

Henry Alpheus Peirce Carter was born August 7, 1837, in Honolulu, Kingdom of Hawai'i. His father was Joseph Oliver Carter (1802–1850), and mother Hannah Trufant Lord (1809–1898). His father was a merchant ship captain, thought to be a descendant of the Thomas Carter family of Massachusetts. Captain Carter left Boston to engage in trade in the Pacific some time in the 1820s. After his 1833 wedding in Honolulu the Carters bought a house and started a family while Captain Carter continued sandalwood trading voyages to China. Shortly after their second son Henry was born they sailed to California (then part of Mexico), but they returned to Hawaii in 1838. In 1840 the family sailed to Boston via Tahiti. The sons were left to attend school, while Captain Carter purchased his own ship and sailed back to Honolulu with his wife in 1841. However, the Carter ship business had several failures, and by 1849 the sons were sent back to Hawaii.

Captain Carter retired from the ship business and started a boarding house called the Mansion House, but he died on August 1, 1850. The children needed to support themselves, so a 12-year-old Henry went to San Francisco to work in the California Gold Rush. He never attended high school. Some time later he returned to work in the Honolulu post office, and as a typesetter for the Honolulu Advertiser newspaper. Around the age of 19, he became a clerk in C. Brewer & Co., a shipping business which was run earlier by Henry A. Peirce, of whom he was probably a namesake. By 1862 he became a full partner in the business. On February 27, 1862, he married Sybil Augusta Judd (1843–1904), daughter of missionary physician turned politician Gerrit P. Judd.

They had seven children:

1. Frances Isabelle Carter was born on January 18, 1863. She moved to Massachusetts and married Frederic Morton Crehore (1858–1919) in 1897.
2. Charles Lunt Carter was born on November 30, 1864, and married Mary Eliza Horton Scott in 1888. He died on January 7, 1895, after being shot in the 1895 Counter-Revolution in Hawaii.
3. George Robert Carter was born December 28, 1866, became Territorial Governor of Hawaiʻi, and died February 11, 1933.
4. Agnes Carter was born on October 15, 1869, and married John Randolf Galt in 1892.
5. Sybil Augusta Carter was born on February 16, 1873, and died on July 12, 1874
6. Cordelia Judd Carter was born on May 18, 1876, and married Charles Atherton Hartwell, son of American Civil War General Alfred S. Hartwell (1836–1912). She died on February 21, 1921.
7. Joshua Dickson Carter was born on February 8, 1880, and died on February 20, 1882.

His nephew Alfred Wellington Carter (1867–1949) managed the Parker Ranch for many years. His brother Joseph Oliver Carter (1835–1909) married Mary Ladd (1840–1908), daughter of the founder of early trading company Ladd & Co. William Ladd (1807–1863).

== Career ==
The American Civil War caused an increase in demand for sugar, and C. Brewer became involved in the business of agent, buying the raw product from sugarcane plantations in the Hawaiian Islands and shipping it to the mainland where it was refined. After two other partners retired, Carter owned two thirds of the firm. In 1873, he advocated for a free trade treaty to reduce tariffs instead of annexation by the United States as advocated by others. He was sent in October 1874 to Washington, D.C. to assist Elisha Hunt Allen in negotiating what became the Reciprocity Treaty of 1875. This included attending a state visit by King Kalākaua to Ulysses S. Grant at the White House.

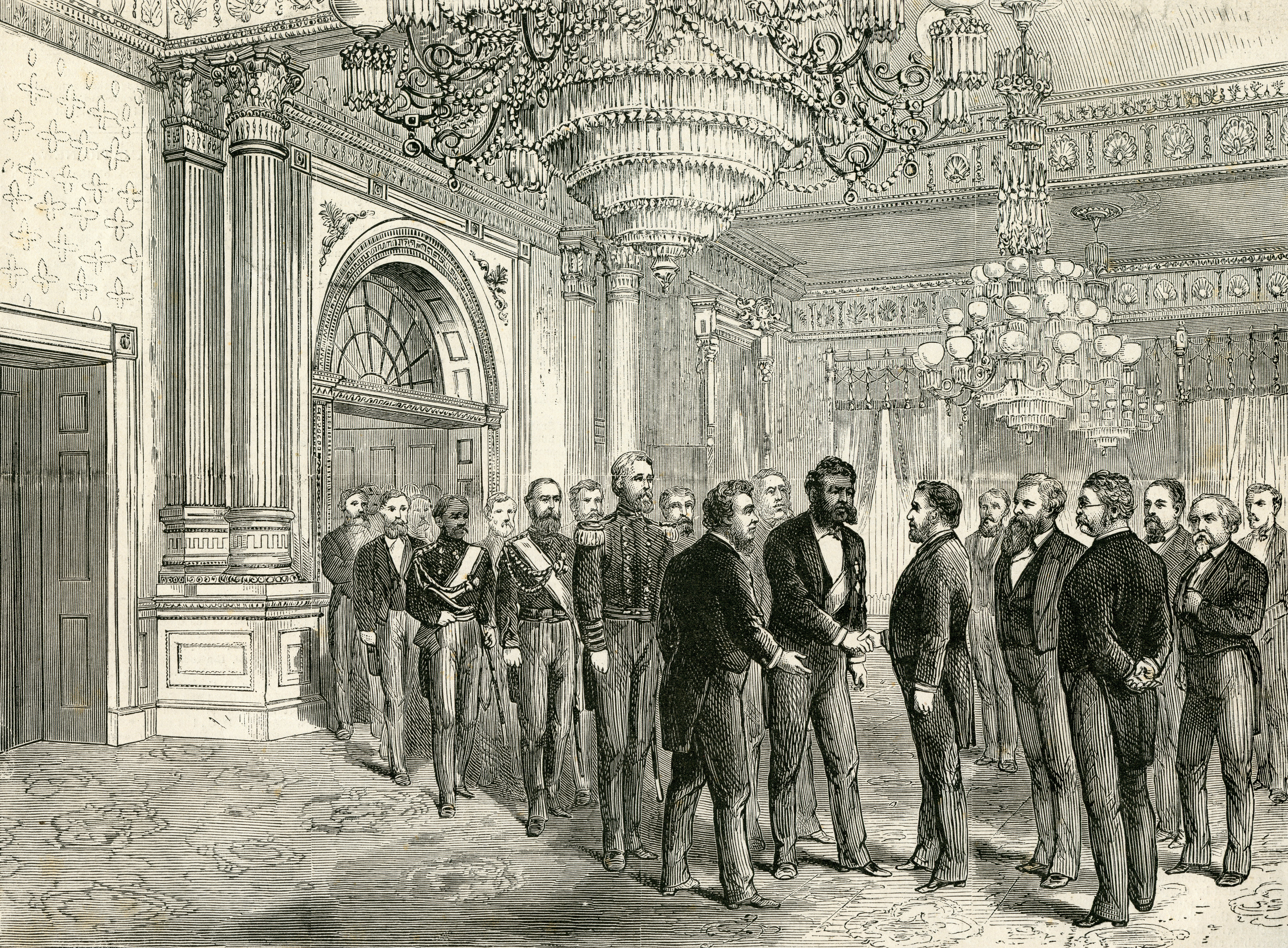
State visit with President Grant in the Blue Room, 1874

On his return to Hawaii, European countries were protesting the treaty, because it violated most favored nation clauses in their treaties. On December 5, 1876, he was appointed minister of foreign affairs, and left his business again to travel to Great Britain, France, and Germany in 1877. He met personally with Otto von Bismarck who was Foreign Minister of Prussia at the time. He resigned from the cabinet on March 1, 1878, and returned to managing the business at C. Brewer in 1879. Soon he was called back into the government. On September 27, 1880, he was appointed minister of the interior for Kalākaua until December 4, 1881. In 1882 he was sent again to Europe, where he negotiated a treaty with Portugal to allow immigration to Hawaii for labor on sugar plantations. After Allen died at the White House, Carter became envoy to the US on February 9, 1883, and served until his death. In June 1884 he was president of a family reunion in Boston for his American cousins.

In January 1887 Carter was appointed US Minister from the Samoan Islands by Malietoa Laupepa, but he never presented those credentials. This was part of a failed plan by Walter M. Gibson to form a pan-Pacific confederation. The resulting Samoan crisis ended up in the partitioning of Samoa into German Samoa in the west and American Samoa in the east.

Also during this time, the free trade treaty was renewed, with a controversial clause that guaranteed the use of Pearl Harbor as a US Navy base. This would prove very unpopular with many Hawaiians. He coordinated another state visit between Queen Kapiʻolani and Grover Cleveland in May 1887. He was also appointed to various boards and commissions during his government service.

The McKinley Tariff act in 1891 removed the advantages given by earlier treaties, and the Hawaiian sugar industry suddenly became unprofitable. Carter scrambled to negotiate another treaty with Secretary of State James G. Blaine. However, Kalākaua had died in January, and Queen Liliʻuokalani rejected the new treaty. Carter became ill on a visit to Germany, and died November 1, 1891, at Everett House in New York City. After a funeral in Washington, D.C., he was buried in Oahu Cemetery. He was survived by his mother, sometimes said to the first caucasian woman to marry in Hawaii, who died January 29, 1898.

A modern historian said:

Henry Alpheus Peirce Carter was probably the ablest diplomat ever to serve the Hawaiian kingdom. ... He was a man of great energy, of positive views and facility in the expression of them, with a self-confident and forceful manner that sometimes antagonized those who disagreed with him. From 1875 until his death he spent most of his time abroad, as a diplomatic representative of the Hawaiian kingdom in the United States and Europe, where he became a familiar and much respected figure.

== See also ==
- Relations between the Kingdom of Hawaii and the United States
- List of bilateral treaties signed by the Kingdom of Hawaii
- Robert Lewers

Government offices
Preceded by William Lowthian Green	Minister of Foreign Affairs, Kingdom of Hawaii; 1876–1878	Succeeded by Henry A. Peirce
Preceded by John E. Bush	Minister of Interior, Kingdom of Hawaii; 1880–1881	Succeeded by William N. Armstrong
Preceded by William N. Armstrong	Attorney General, Kingdom of Hawaii; January–November 1881	Succeeded by Edward Preston
Diplomatic posts
Preceded by Elisha Hunt Allen	Minister to the US, Kingdom of Hawaii; 1883–1891	Succeeded by John Mott-Smith
