= Eugene J. de Sabla =

American businessman (1865–1956)

- Born: Eugene Joly de Sabla Jr. January 20, 1865; Panama
- Died: January 18, 1956 (aged 90); New York City, New York, US
- Known for: co-founder, Pacific Gas and Electric Company

Eugene Joly de Sabla Jr. (January 20, 1865 – January 18, 1956) was a co-founder of California Gas and Electric Company and Pacific Gas and Electric Company (PG&E).

== Early life ==
He was born in Panama, on January 20, 1865. The family emigrated to San Francisco around 1870, where de Sabla's father worked in real estate; Leon, Eugene's brother, was born in 1876.

== Career ==
After graduating from Lowell High School in 1883, de Sabla worked in an Arizona copper mine in which his father shared ownership; after his mother died in 1885, he returned to San Francisco and formed a partnership with his father on July 31, 1886, which was a brokerage. de Sabla founded the Nevada County Development and Improvement Company with Alfonso Tregidgo in 1889, seeking to develop mines and install electric streetlights in Nevada County, California, but the company was not successful; undeterred, the partners founded the Nevada County Electric Power Company in 1892, signing an agreement at the National Exchange Hotel in Nevada City to develop a hydroelectric project on the South Yuba River.

de Sabla unilaterally dissolved his father's company in 1893, possibly causing strife within the family, and in 1894, the Nevada County Electric Power Company moved from Grass Valley to San Francisco. Construction of Rome Powerhouse, which was named for an early investor, Romulus Riggs Colgate, was delayed until 1895; Lake Vera, named for de Sabla's daughter and approximately 2 mi (3.2 km) north of Nevada City, was formed when the first phase of Rome Powerhouse was completed in early 1896. In 1900 and 1901, de Sabla founded the Bay Counties Power Company and California Gas and Electric Company, respectively, with his partner John Martin. BCPC demonstrated a 120 mi (190 km) transmission line carrying power from the Yuba River to Vallejo in 1901. de Sabla's father sailed for Guatemala in September 1901, where he died in 1902.

In 1905, de Sabla and Martin consolidated their holdings and reincorporated as Pacific Gas and Electric Company. Both were indicted in 1907 by a grand jury in San Francisco alongside others including Abe Ruef and Mayor Eugene Schmitz, collectively accused of bribing each member of the San Francisco Board of Supervisors with US$750 (equivalent to $25,900 in 2025) to fix the gas rate at US$0.85 (equivalent to $30 in 2025).

de Sabla sold "El Cerrito", his estate in Hillsborough at the intersection of El Camino Real and Santa Inez, and moved to New York in 1919. De Sabla died on January 18, 1956, at his home at 200 East Seventy-eighth Street in New York City, two days before his 91st birthday.

== Legacy ==
- Eugene J. de Sabla, Jr., Teahouse and Tea Garden, a former residence now listed on the National Register of Historic Places in San Mateo County, California
- de Sabla Apartments, an apartment building in San Mateo, California, built in the 1950s on the site of the former de Sabla estate "El Cerrito"
