= List of bilateral treaties signed by the Hawaiian Kingdom =

Many bilateral treaties were signed by the Hawaiian Kingdom.

== Under Kamehameha III ==
- United States of America, December 23, 1826 (Treaty)
- United Kingdom, November 13, 1836 (Lord E. Russell's Treaty)
- France, July 17, 1839 (Captain LaPlace's Convention)
- France, March 26, 1846 (Treaty)
- United Kingdom, March 26, 1846 (Treaty)
- Denmark, October 19, 1846 (Treaty)
- Hamburg, January 8, 1848 (Treaty)
- Agreement Touching Consular Notices (Danish and Hamburg Treaties), January 25, 1848
- United States of America, December 20, 1849 (Treaty of Friendship, Commerce and Navigation)
- Sweden and Norway, July 1, 1852 (Treaty)
- Tahiti, November 24, 1853
- Bremen, March 27, 1854 (Treaty)

== Under Kamehameha IV ==
- France, September 8, 1858 (Treaty)
- Belgium, October 4, 1862 (Treaty)
- Netherlands, October 16, 1862 (Treaty)
- Italy, July 22, 1863 (Treaty)
- Spain, October 9, 1863 (Treaty)

== Under Kamehameha V ==
- Swiss Confederation, July 20, 1864 (Treaty)
- Russia, June 19, 1869 (Treaty)
- Japan, August 17, 1871 (Treaty)

== Under Kalākaua ==
- New South Wales, March 10, 1874 (Postal Convention)
- United States of America, January 30, 1875 (Reciprocity Treaty)
- German Empire, 1879–80 (Treaty)
- Portugal, May 5, 1882 (Provisional Convention)
- United States of America, December 6, 1884 (Supplementary Convention)
- Hong Kong, December 13, 1884 (Money Order Regulations)
- Universal Postal Union, March 21, 1885 (Additional Act of Lisbon)
- Japan, January 28, 1886 (Convention)
- Universal Postal Union, November 9, 1886 (Ratification)
- Samoa, March 20, 1887 (Treaty)

== See also ==
- Hawaiian Kingdom
- Hawaiian Kingdom–United States relations
- Hawaii–Tahiti relations
