= George R. Carter =

American politician (1866–1933)

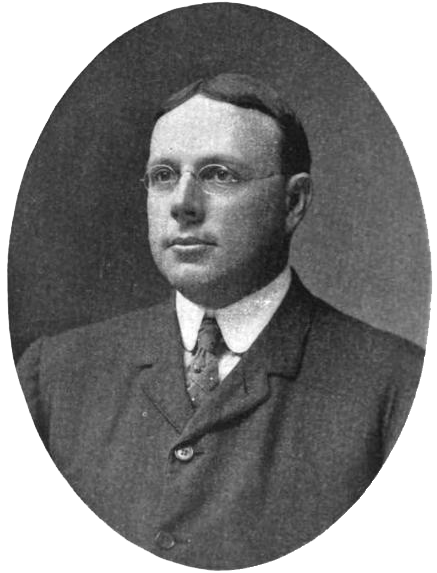

2nd Territorial Governor of Hawaii
- In office November 23, 1903 – August 15, 1907
- Appointed by: Theodore Roosevelt
- Preceded by: Sanford B. Dole
- Succeeded by: Walter F. Frear

Personal details
- Born: George Robert Carter; December 28, 1866 Honolulu, Hawaiian Kingdom
- Died: February 11, 1933 (aged 66) Honolulu, Territory of Hawaii
- Party: Republican
- Spouse: Helen Strong Carter
- Children: 4, including Elizabeth Carter Bogardus
- Parent(s): Henry Alpheus Peirce Carter; Sybil Augusta Judd
- Education: Phillips Academy, Yale
- Occupation: Banker, politician

George Robert Carter (December 28, 1866 – February 11, 1933) was the second territorial governor of Hawaii, serving from 1903 to 1907.

== Early life ==
Carter was born December 28, 1866, in Honolulu. His mother was Sybil Augusta Judd (1843–1906), daughter of Gerrit P. Judd, and his father was businessman Henry Alpheus Peirce Carter.

Carter was educated at Fort Street School in Honolulu (now McKinley High School) and Phillips Academy in Andover, Massachusetts. He then attended Yale University, graduating with a Ph.B. While at Yale, he was a member of St. Anthony Hall.

After Yale, Carter spent time serving an apprenticeship with Seattle National Bank.

== Career ==
In 1895 Carter returned to Hawaiʻi to become the cashier of C. Brewer & Co., where his father had been a senior partner from 1862 to 1874. From 1898 to 1902, he helped organize and manage the Hawaiian Trust Company, and was managing director of the Hawaiian Fertilizer Company. In addition, he served as a director for Bank of Hawaii, C. Brewer, and Alexander & Baldwin.

Carter was elected to the Hawaii Territorial Senate from Oahu in 1901. While a territorial senator, he was sent to Washington as an unofficial agent to discuss territorial matters with President Theodore Roosevelt. Roosevelt eventually appointed him Secretary of the Territory in 1902, and then Territorial Governor in 1903, succeeding Sanford B. Dole who resigned to become a federal judge.

In 1905, during Carter's administration, the current system of county governments was created; the five county governments (Oahu, Maui, Kauaʻi, Hawaiʻi, and Kalawao) took effect on January 1, 1906. (Oahu County later became the City and County of Honolulu in 1909.)

== Personal life ==
He married Helen Strong, daughter of Eastman Kodak president Henry A. Strong April 19, 1892. They had four children: Elizabeth (born August 25, 1895), Phoebe (born September 27, 1897), a daughter who died on June 17, 1903, and George Robert Jr. (born November 10, 1905).

He formed a rowing club with W. B. Goodwin, Hiram Bingham and Marshall Latham Bond, whose members turned their boats over to the University of Washington to begin its rowing program when it broke up.

After his retirement and until his death on February 11, 1933, in Honolulu, Hawaii, Carter remained active in the community. He was a member of the Hawaiian Historical Society and engaged in historical research, collecting valuable books and documents. In 1922, Carter donated his collection to the Hawaiian Mission Children's Society, which continues to maintain it as well as the Mission Houses Museum. He was buried in Oahu Cemetery.

Carter's estate was appraised at $1,153,902. His will provided for a $25,000 bequest to Kauikeolani Children's Hospital. His wife Helen Strong Carter received one-third of his estate, with his two living children receiving the remaining two-thirds.

Political offices
Preceded by Sanford B. Dole	Territorial Governor of Hawaii; 1903–1907	Succeeded by Walter F. Frear
