= Henry A. Strong =

American photography businessman (1838–1919)

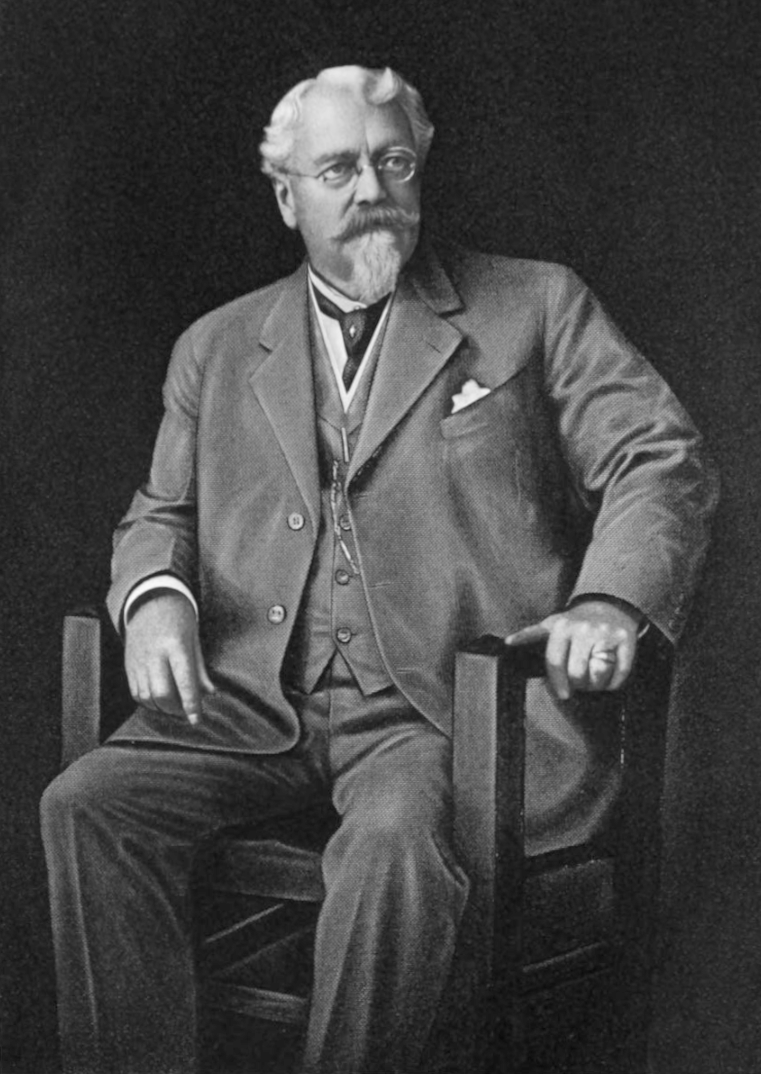
- Born: Henry Alvah Strong; August 30, 1838; Rochester, New York, U.S.
- Died: July 26, 1919 (aged 80); Rochester, New York, U.S.
- Occupations: Photography businessman, inventor
- Spouses: Helen Phoebe Griffin (m. 1859; died 1904) Hattie Maria (Corrin) Lockwood (m. 1905)
- Children: Gertrude Achilles; Helen Carter; Henry G. Strong; Lester Corrin Strong

Signature
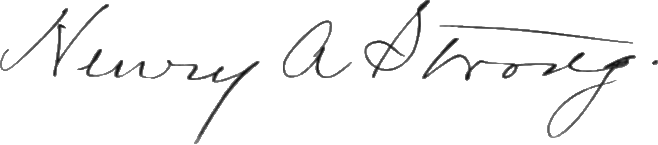

Henry Alvah Strong (August 30, 1838 – July 26, 1919) was an American photography businessman. He was the first president of the Eastman Kodak Company.

== Early life and family ==
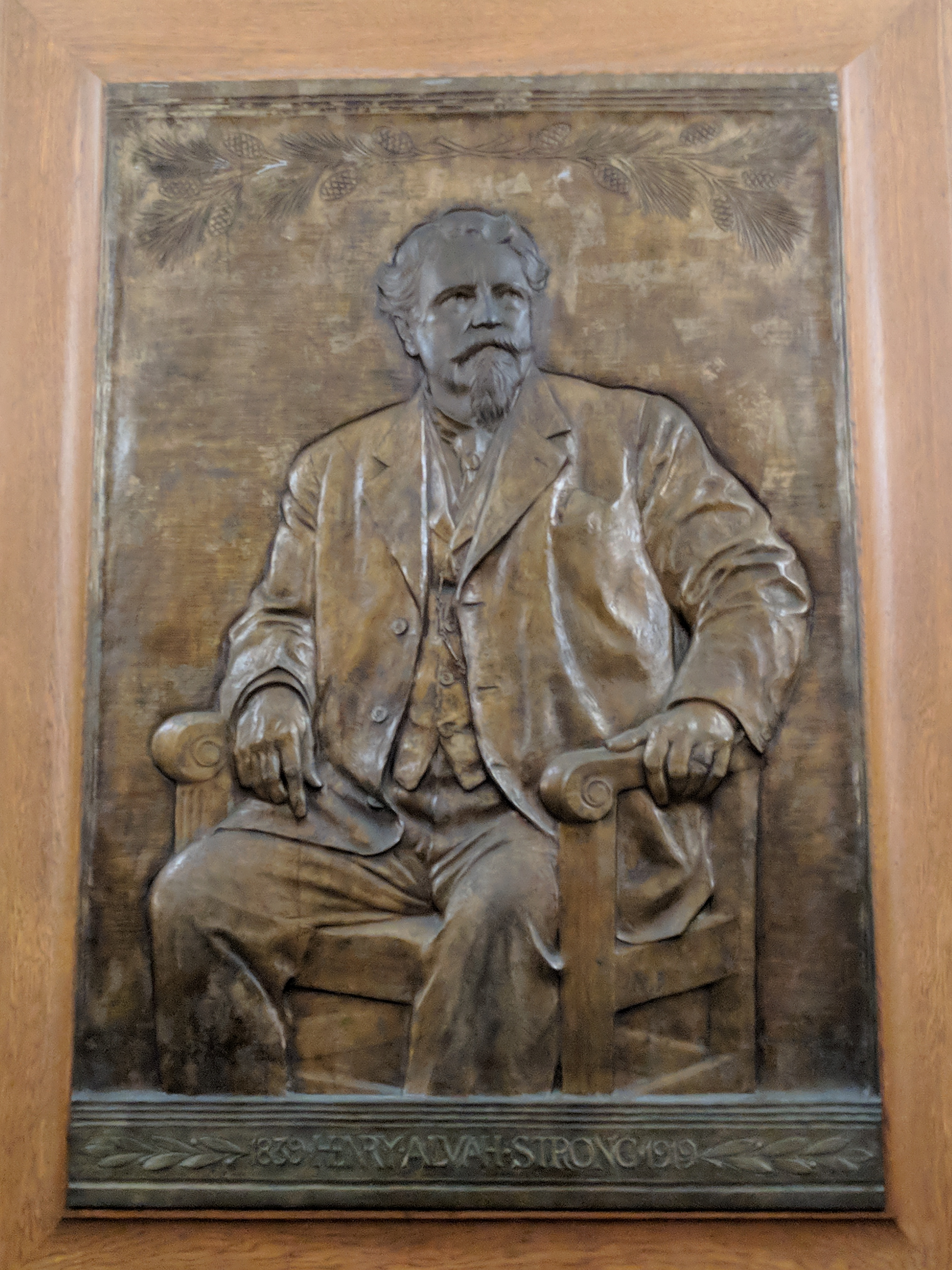
Bas-relief in Strong Auditorium on the University of Rochester River Campus

Henry Strong was born on August 30, 1838, in Rochester, New York. His brother was the theologian Augustus Hopkins Strong.

He graduated from Wyoming Academy in 1858. On August 30, 1859, he married Helen Phoebe Griffin. They had three children: Gertrude Achilles, Helen Carter, and Henry G. Strong. After Helen's death in 1904 from diabetes, he married Hattie (Corrin) Lockwood on June 14, 1905. He adopted her son, Corrin, and the family returned to Rochester, New York.

== Business ventures ==
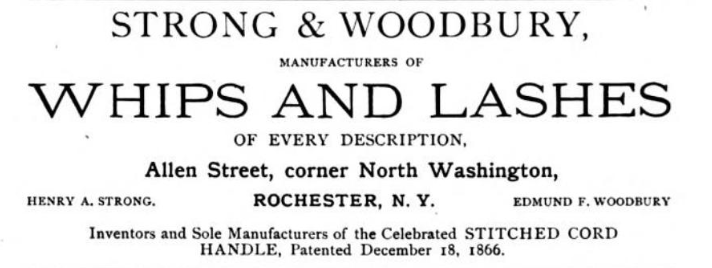
1887 ad for Strong and Woodbury Lashes

Strong held a lead position in his family's buggy whip manufacturing company prior to meeting George Eastman in 1870. The two entered a partnership in 1880 and the Eastman Dry Plate Company was founded on January 1, 1881, with Strong as president and Eastman as treasurer. It would later become Eastman Kodak Company.

Strong died at his home in Rochester on July 26, 1919.

== Legacy ==
Numerous buildings in Rochester, notably Strong Memorial Hospital and Strong Auditorium at the University of Rochester were built from his philanthropy.

Business positions
New office	President of Eastman Kodak; 1884 – July 26, 1919	Vacant Title next held by George Eastman
