= Adobe Schoolhouse =

School building in Honolulu, Hawaii, U.S.

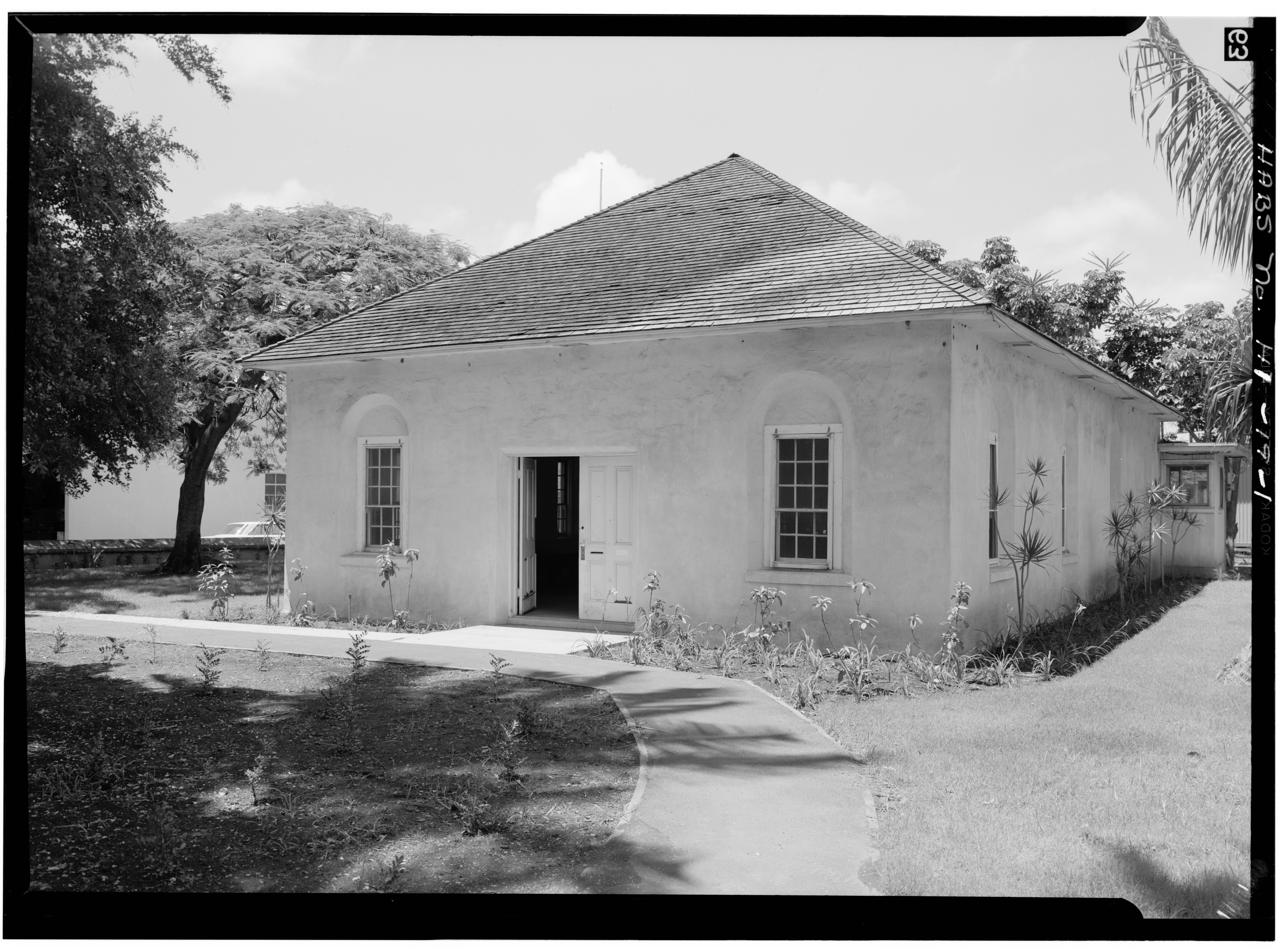
Adobe Schoolhouse, Kawaiahao Street at Mission Lane, Honolulu, Honolulu County, Hawaii

Adobe Schoolhouse (also known as Old Mission School House, Old School House, and Mrs. Bingham's school house; established in 1835) is a one-room school building in Honolulu, Hawaii. Built by the American Board of Commissioners for Foreign Missions (ABCFM), it served for many years as a public school house and as a Sunday school building for Kawaiahaʻo Church, which it predates. Cool, spacious, and generous in the proportions of its length, breadth, lofty ceiling, and deeply recessed windows, the room is representative of early missionary days to the Sandwich Islands. In addition to serving as a school, it was a meeting house, and the home of the Free Kindergarten Association. The Adobe Schoolhouse is a contributing property to the Hawaiian Mission Houses Historic Site and Archives and the Hawaii Capital Historic District.

== History ==
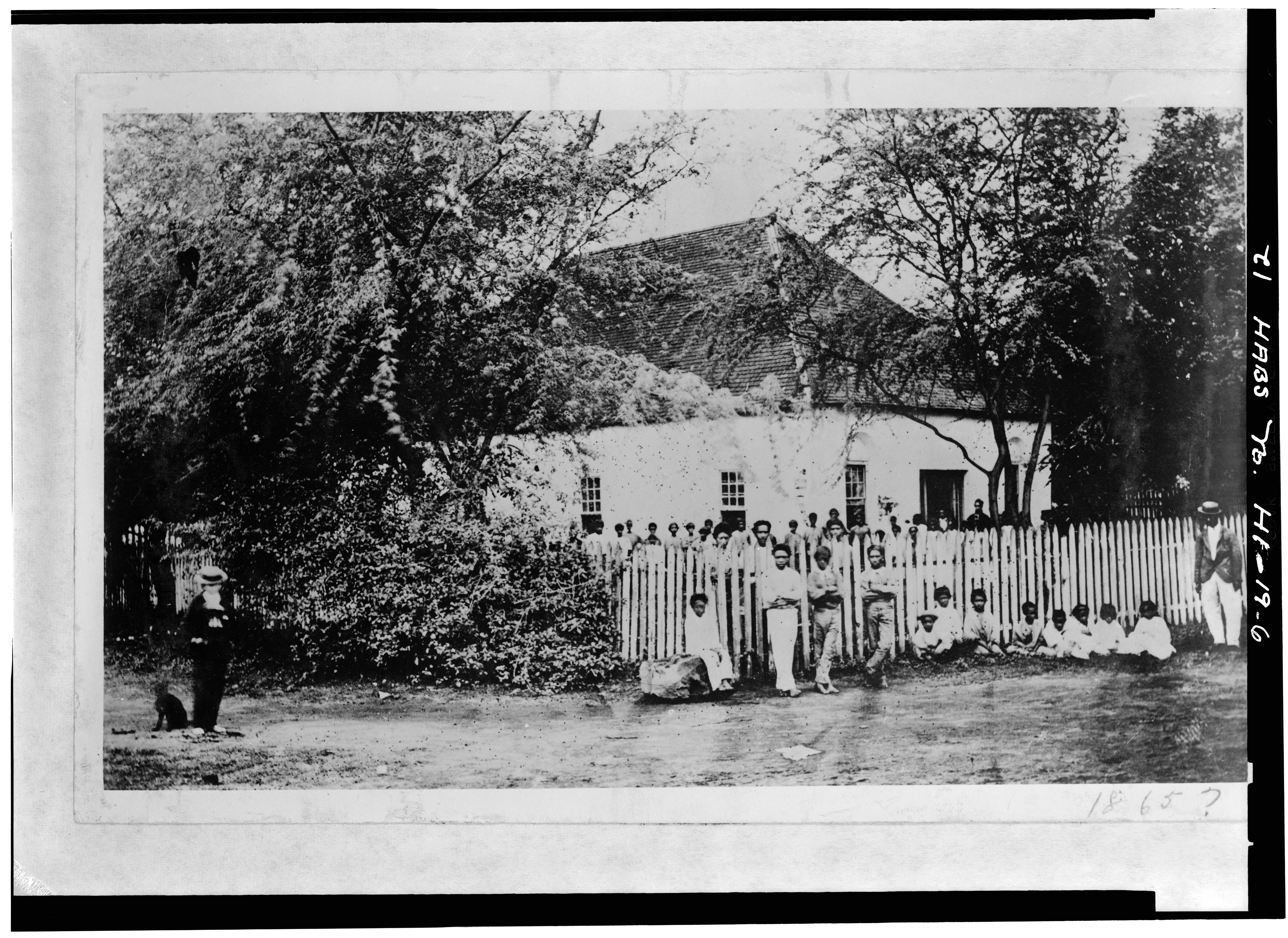
(c. 1865)

The schoolhouse was built sometime between 1827 and 1835, for Mrs. Sibyl Bingham's Mission School for Hawaiians. There wasn't a tree in sight-nor were there many trees in any place in the Mission compound at that time. Mrs. Armstrong planted the church yard and vicinity with Algeroba trees. When the adobe blocks were first laid, Honolulu was a village of thatched houses straggling along across a barren, dusty plain.

The ABCFM's General Meetings were held in the summer, and the rest of the year, the house was used for a school for Hawaiian children taught to be Hawaiian teachers. It was built for this purpose.

The Hawaiians and everyone always thought of it and spoke of it as Mrs. Bingham's school house because she was the only one of the mission mothers who could manage to carry on school work even part of the time. She superintended the building of it herself, probably in the 1830s, perhaps even as far back as the 1820s.

From the earliest days of the mission there was a school in the immediate vicinity. Mother Bingham recorded that she "gathered the first school Oahu ever saw". She lived and worked near by, teaching at first in her own thatched house, later in one room of the old frame house on King Street. Mother Thurston and other women of the mission took their turns at the desk of the mission school for Hawaiians, first in one small room and then another, until the station report of 1829 finally records in the Missionary Herald of September. 1830: "As evidence of some progress among the people, we are happy to mention the erection of a large school house, 128 feet (39 m) in length by 37 feet (11 m) in breadth, for the accommodation of our higher schools, or classes, on the monitorial pian."

The literacy rate on the island was raised to 80% after the schoolhouse was constructed.

== Architecture and fittings ==
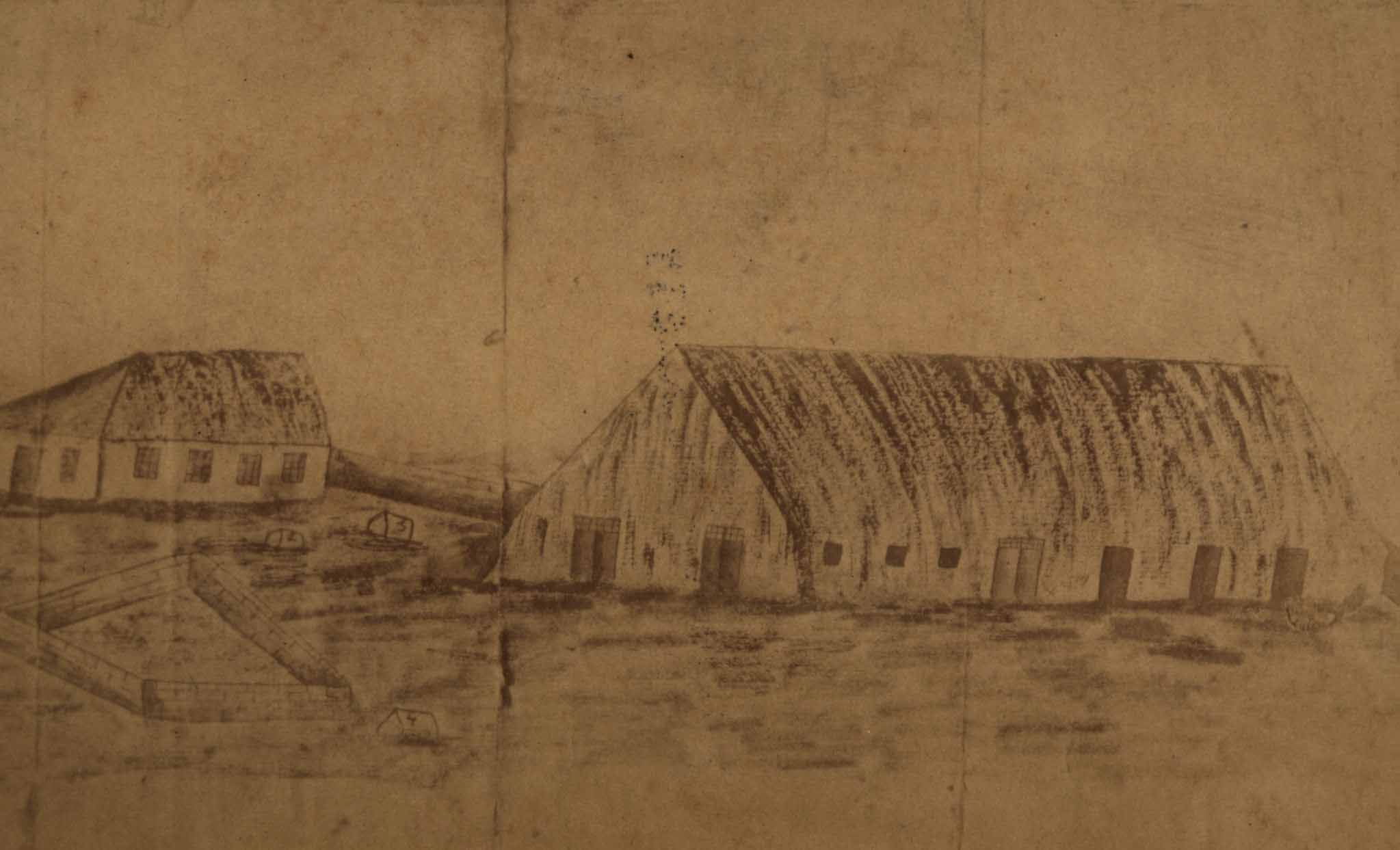
Adobe Schoolhouse and Kawaiahao Church and Cemetery, 1832

The schoolhouse was built of air-dried adobe bricks and lumber, sometime between 1827 and 1835.

Structures of native thatch were frail and temporary as evidenced by the mention of the first missionary school house, which was more than twice as long as the Adobe Schoolhouse, its successor. Dr. Judd wrote the ABCFM in Boston on October 23, 1833:

The fine large school house built at our station was blown down last fall and all the benches, doors, etc., were crushed in the ruins. * ** It was altogether too large, 120 feet long *** badly lighted, having no glass windows, the seats and desks of the rudest kind imaginable, the former being made of mud bricks piled up in rows, and the latter of boards nailed to legs driven into the ground... Mr. Bingham has succeeded in inducing the natives to rebuild it, and when I left home, the work had commenced. It will be about 66–30 feet (20.1–9.1 m). It will be more permanent than before, and as it is for the accommodation of the weekly meetings, it will be a very useful building.

There is reasonable certainty that the two are identical, as the dimensions are nearly the same; the present one of adobe is "more permanent", as he prophecies, than the huge old one; and the present one must have been erected between 1833 and 1835. Unfortunately, the mission records do not mention erection of this "new adobe school house", concerning themselves largely at this time with the project of an extension of the mission to the Marquesas Islands. The perusal of many manuscript reports and letters provided no further information than this brief mention by Dr. Judd. Mr. W. R. Castle, in an article upon it for the Cousins' Society at the time of its restoration in 1920, quotes the first mention of it from the minutes of the General Meeting of the mission "in June–July, 1835", where the statement appears:

Convened in the School House at 9 a. m., June 4th, 1835.

In October 1837, Mother Cooke, who arrived that year as one of the brides of the missionary reinforcement, gave a description of the then new school house. and of her work there. In a diary written for her younger sister in the U.S., she said:

We have a very good school house built of mud and plastered inside and out with lime made of coral. It is thatched with grass, has a floor, seats and benches in front to write upon. It is about 60 feet by 30. It was built by the people and cost about 600 dollars. All our scholars assemble in it and after prayers the native teachers take their scholars into the old grass meeting house, leaving us with about 60, which we manage ourselves. These can most of them read intelligibly, some of them history, others study geography and someare reading in a little book of natural mental arithmetic. In the language we (teachers) get along pretty well, but it will probably be some time before we shall be able to speak with that ease and fluency with which we can convey ideas in our native tongue. Mr. Cooke opens the school in the native tongue with prayer. However, no one can know but by experience how hard it is to be obliged to teach in a language with which one is but imperfectly acquainted.

The desks were long benches, running from the center aisle to the side of the long single room of the building. Attached to the back of each seat or bench was the sloping desk or table, at a proper height for the sitter, and under this desk, was a shelf for books, slates, etc. The school furniture was all made of soft white pine and it was not long before it began to show that not even missionary boys with sharp knives could resist the temptation to do a little artistic carving.

In the present-day, plaster has been applied to the interior walls. The original adobe wall is still viewable via a small wooden door.

== Other uses ==
For many years, this mission school house, the largest in Honolulu, continued to serve for the annual meetings of the mission as a whole, with an occasional meeting, after 1842, "in the Stone Meeting House", probably referring to Kawaiahao Church.

According to Asa Thurston in his presidential address to the "Cousins", in the first annual meeting, in 1853, the Hawaiian Mission Children's Society was established in this building, on June 5, 1852. Each annual meeting of the Cousins' Society for the first ten years of its existence was held in the 'Old School House.'

In 1912, another "child of the mission" wrote down some of her memories of "General Meeting" in the Old School House." Ellen Armstrong ("Aunt Ellen Weaver"), recorded:

On the Waikiki side of Kawaiahao Church, are the ruins of the old adobe school house square and serene in outline like its New England prototype. Here our fathers gathered once a year from the various stations far and near to discuss and confer on matters of importance pertaining to the location of churches, schools, church government... Scholarly essays were read on the construction of the Hawaiian language, the origin of Polynesian races, and kindred subjects, which were printed in the Spectator... Sermons were preached in English that were a treat and an inspiration to those who came from far out stations and heard only the Hawaiian language in the pulpit. Matters of church discipline were decided... Sometimes opinion varied, and the brethren "warmed to the subject" -but the session ended with the hymn, "Blest be the tie that binds our hearts in Christian love," and it did bind-and they parted in good fellowship. The busy, practical mothers of the Mission exchanged patterns, and receipts, and re-trimmed their bonnets that came around Cape Horn to Honolulu models, and held prayerful "Maternal Meetings" between sessions in the schoolhouse... This Maternal Association carefully recorded the birth of every child born into the Mission, and published the Blue Book. The mothers attended the "General Meetings" with their sewing and mending, while keeping an eye on the youngsters that occupied the side benches. When restless, the children were allowed to gather in groups on the outside of the school house and told to be "good children".

The 'Old School House' continued to be the center of missionary gatherings for many years. But these meetings were not the only assemblies held in the old school hall. At the close of the final session of the 'General Meeting,' the missionaries and their families met to partake of the Communion in commemoration of the 'Last Supper'. The ministers held meetings there, too. The building was also used for Sunday school. In the 1870s, when Charles R. Bishop was superintendent of Public Instruction, the old mission school building was rented by the government for a public school; a partition was put in, and it was so used for many years. At general meeting time, a children's meeting was held every morning in the school house before the whole body of the mission assembled there at nine.

== 1920s restoration ==
By 1920, the centennial year of the ABCFM's Hawaiian Protestant Mission, the adobe block walls, exposed to wind and weather by holes in the roof, were in danger of crumbling away altogether. This condition was recognized as a calamity by a group of "mission children" who, inspired by the enthusiasm of one of their number, Mrs. Harriet Castle-Coleman, promptly decided to restore it so that it was once again useful.

After a careful and exhaustive inspection, it was decided that it could be restored. The services of Mr. Eskew, who was doing the restorative work on the Chamberlain House, were secured. The schoolhouse had been condemned and was soon to be torn down and a house for the janitor of the church was to be put in its place. Instead, the trustees granted a ten-year lease to the Hawaiian Mission Children's Society, of the house and grounds, reserving a 10 feet (3.0 m) strip on the front of the lot between the Old Mission School House grounds and the Kawaiahao Mission Cemetery grounds; this for a right of way to the janitor's cottage belonging to the church. This preliminary being arranged, the work of restoration began. It was completed in 1921. The building was restored at a cost of about US$3,500. The kitchenette, lavatory, and other work at the rear cost about US$1,000. The whole amount raised was above US$4,500, a small balance was used to put the grounds in order. When this was done, there was a final balance of between US$8 and US$9, which was turned over in the Spring of 1924 to Miss Lawrence to apply towards fitting up the rooms for the occupation as Headquarters of the Association. The Hawaiian Mission Children's Society, on obtaining the lease from the Kawaiahao Church trustees, sub-leased the premises to the Association for nine years for US$1 a year, which sum of US$9 was paid in advance to the Hawaiian Mission Children's Society. The Association not being ready to occupy the building, leased it temporarily from month to month, first to Mrs. Burnham for an art studio, and after she left, to the Humane Society for a Thrift Shop, until the Association was ready to occupy it.
