= Hawaiian Mission Children's Society =

Hawaiian Mission Children's Society (acronym, HMCS; sometimes abbreviated as Mission Children's Society; common name, Cousins' Society; originally, Social Missionary Society; est. 1852) is an American historical and memorial society of descendants of Protestant missionaries associated with the American Board of Commissioners for Foreign Missions (ABCFM) to the Hawaiian Kingdom. It was founded in Honolulu in 1852. At that time, the Hawaiian Islands had been largely evangelized. The families of the missionaries were rapidly growing up around them. Many of the older children had been sent to the U.S. for further advantages in education. The foreign community outside of the missionary circle was small, and all social and literary advantages centered in missionary families. Incorporated in 1907, in 1920, it established the Hawaiian Mission Houses Historic Site and Archives.

== History ==
Incentive to form such a society manifested in 1852. Luther Halsey Gulick, the eldest son of Rev. Peter J. and Mrs. Fannie T. Gulick, early sent to the U.S. for education, returned with his young wife, Louisa Lewis Gulick, both of them full of missionary zeal. With Rev. and Mrs. Benjamin G. Snow, and Rev. and Mrs. Albert Sturges, they were bound westward to commence a new mission in Polynesia, to be called the Micronesian Mission, which was to enlist also members of the native Hawaiian churches in foreign missions. The stay in Honolulu of three months sparked the formation of the HMCS.

The society was organized on June 5, 1852, by the young people of Honolulu associated with the ABCFM. These young folk had assembled informally two weeks before, on May 22, at the Old Mission School House, in Kawaiahao Lane and occupied later by the Boy Scouts, to welcome home one of their number, Luther Gulick, who had left Hawaii at the age of 12, to secure an education, and had now returned with his new wife, under appointment of the ABCFM to organize a mission in Micronesia. Gulick, in an earnest, enthusiastic manner, talked of his work, asked for cooperation, and pictured the satisfaction it would be to him could he but feel that his near and dear island friends were with him in thought and sympathy, and in assistance also in case of need. There was in the audience another son of the missionaries, Asa Goodale Thurston, but lately arrived from California, having spent some time there after his graduation at Williams College. His appearance, when seen with his cowboy hat, curled-up moustache, and general mien of a California miner, was not that of a pious mission worker. But he had inherited an admiration for pioneer work and missions, and with his natural force and energy, he took up the project, and was appointed to draft a constitution. He at once struck off the "Constitution of the Hawaiian Mission Children's Society", which was promptly adopted, and was the bond under which the society during the following 50 years raised and expended US$76,000 in prosecuting mission work in the islands of the Pacific.

The preamble to the constitution reads:—

"We, the children of the American Protestant Mission of the Hawaiian Islands, desiring to strengthen the bond of union that naturally exists among us, and to cultivate the missionary spirit among ourselves; also with the view of aiding in the support of the Micronesia Mission about to be sent forth, one of whose members is of our number, do hereby organize ourselves into a social missionary society under the following Constitution and By-Laws."

The design of the society, as expressed in the second article of its constitution, was originally recorded as:—

"To cherish and promote union among its members; to cultivate in them an active Missionary spirit; to stir them up to good works, and more especially to assist in the support of those children of Missionaries who may go forth from these islands on Christian Missions."

The name "Cousins' Society" was given by Orramel Hinckley Gulick, who said that as the fathers and mothers spoke constantly of each other as "brother" and "sister," their children were cousins, hence "Cousins' Society" became the common name.

The society supported Gulick for nine years, till failing health compelled his return; then support was given to the Micronesian, Marquesas and Mortlock missions, and money expended upon the island boarding schools, Waialua, Kawaiahao, Maunaolu, Kohala and Hilo Boarding School; especially in the education of the children of the Hawaiian missionaries at Marquesas.

One of the early needs of these Micronesian missionaries was transportation from island to island. A thought was suggested in 1855, that the children of the Sunday schools in the U.S. be asked to build a missionary vessel of 150 tons, for the service of this mission. Certificates of stock, in shares of US$.10 each were issued, and 285,454 shares were taken, mostly by youthful shareholders from the U.S. and elsewhere. Multitudes of supporters of missions trace their first awakening to interest in foreign missions to the purchasing of a US$.10 share in the first Morning Star. Thus the mission work of the society, in itself, was thrilling, yet this was but one of its objects.

Meetings were appointed for "the last Saturday evening of each month," which time was soon changed to "the Saturday evening of each month nearest the full moon. These meetings were opened by prayer and singing, and closed with the missionary hymn, "Waft, waft ye winds His story," and a collection for their missionary was taken up. Otherwise the meetings were social, literary and musical.

The first entertainment consisted of essays, some of which were preserved. Then for variety, the essayists were set aside, and committees appointed to secure musical numbers and anonymous contributions. This plan worked well. It infused life into the workers and by its pledges of secrecy, some who would not venture on previous literary works were induced to contribute to the entertainment. The best music the islands could produce was prepared for these occasions, and valuable literary efforts, essays and debates were presented.

The social attractions were perhaps even greater than the literary; these were facilitated by the "veranda brigade". Lifelong friendships were made, and at least one marriage, that of O. H. Gulick and Annie Clark occurred at a "cousins' meeting" in the same Adobe Schoolhouse. At the time of the organization of this society, there were perhaps not more than 20 non-native families outside the mission circle. As the monthly "cousins' meeting" was about the only social function in Honolulu society, other people of refinement were very glad to receive invitations to these meetings. Many of them became annual members, and some secured a life membership and became, as adopted cousins, as loyal as are those born into the mission.

As the years went by, the original members were scattered. A new generation arose. Society's demands were many and moonlit Saturday nights were used for other meetings. The missionary work of the society, also, seemed to be duplicated by the Hawaiian Board of Missions, and the "cousins" found they were contributing twice to the same object. The society seemed to have outgrown the purpose for which it had been organized, and there was talk of disbanding.

In 1904, after much discussion, a change was made in the constitution, including this one article:—

"The design of the society shall be to perpetuate the memory of the mission fathers and mothers who brought Christianity to these Islands, also to promote union among its members, to cultivate in them an active missionary spirit, stir them up to good deeds, and to assist in the support of Christian work."

The Society was incorporated in 1907. The "Old Mission Home" and the old coral "Chamberlain House" were presented to the society by the C. M. Cooke, and his sons. Photographs of the missionaries were secured and framed, and a book of genealogies of the missionaries and their descendants was prepared. The cousins also collected autographs, manuscripts, journals, letters, and publications.

A meeting was held yearly at the Old Mission Home.

The money received was held in trust till enough had been accumulated to put up a suitable memorial building in honor of the fathers and mothers. A special fund went for the upkeep and necessary expenses of the society; and the income from another invested fund, which can not be diverted from benevolent purposes, was expended in helping the Nauru mission and a mission in Turkey, and in educating pupils in mission boarding schools.

The Cousins Society did not entirely desert its original objects, but became a Memorial Society.

Bernice Judd (1903–1971) worked as a librarian at the Hawaiian Mission Children's Society from 1929 until 1962, where she also published a few history books.

== Membership ==
The Social Missionary Society commenced with 153 members, and at the close of 50 years, 93 of the original members were still living. Gradually, the terms of admission were extended to others not of missionary decent, but of like sympathies, and many of them teachers in the local schools. By natural increase and the admission of the parents as honorary members, the roll of the society had increased in 1902 to 1,404. This included both living and deceased members.

In 1913, it had about 1,000 members, ranging in age from childhood to 86 years, scattered throughout the world and inhabiting almost every region, yet keeping in yearly touch with one another.

== Publications ==
The Annual Report, which began publication in 1853, was sent out regularly with its roll call of members. In 1861, a new departure was made, and The Maile Wreath, a monthly paper was edited and became the chief literary feature of the meetings until the close of 1896. The Maile Wreath contains articles of value written by men who subsequently received world renown.

The society gradually assumed a commemorative character to perpetuate the memory of parents. The Hawaiian Missionary Album was published around 1902 with photogravures of as many of the parents as could be secured.

Annual report 1853

Annual report 1856

Annual report 1857

Annual report 1858

Annual report 1859

== See also ==
- Daughters of Hawaii
