= Makiki =

Neighborhood of Honolulu, Hawaii, United States

Coordinates: 21°18′20.19″N 157°49′48.38″W

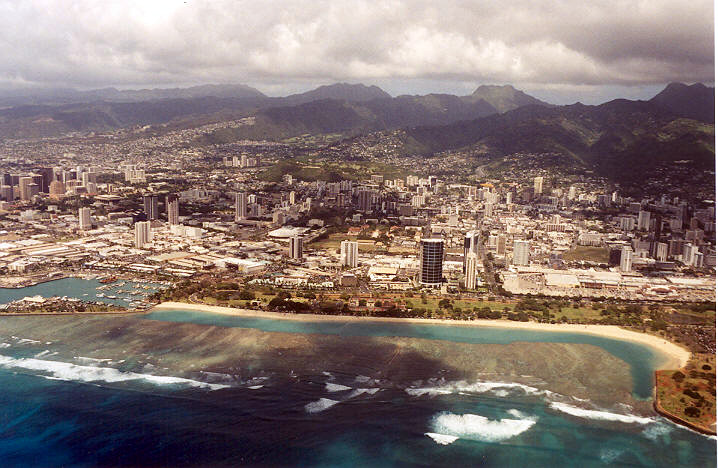
Makiki stretches from downtown Honolulu to Mānoa and Waikīkī, bounded to the north by Makiki Heights and Makiki Valley and to the south by Ala Moana.

Makiki is an area of Honolulu, Hawaiʻi, northeast of downtown Honolulu, stretching east to west from Punahou Street to Pensacola Street and north to south from Round Top Drive/Makiki Heights Drive to Lunalilo Freeway. Punchbowl, an extinct tuff cone, and Tantalus overlook the Makiki.

== Composition of area ==
The area consists primarily of older houses, smaller apartment buildings, and side streets. Major roadways include Punahou Street, Pensacola Street, Piʻikoi Street, Nehoa Street, and Wilder Avenue. The area also includes a fire station, hospital, public school system, private schools including Punahou School, churches of various denominations, a library, a community center, marketplace, and parks. The valley heights have hiking trails owned by the state for public use, and are mostly underdeveloped; a nonprofit conservation organization, Hawaii Nature Center, has a small property providing conservation education and work opportunity to local students.

Two Makiki community organizations, Hui o Makiki and Friends of Makiki Community Library, have worked together to create a Makiki Community with information about educational, cultural, recreational, and social-service offerings in the Makiki area, including a calendar of events.

== History ==
Punahou school opened in Makiki on July 11, 1842, with the mission of educating missionary children, on a land grant of 200 acres from Governor Boki near the site of Kapunahou water spring. Makiki is also the site of the Claus "King of Sugar" Spreckels Victorian-style mansion near Dole Street, which was later refurbished and converted into the St. Louis Alumni Clubhouse. Lunalilo Home opened in Makiki under the sponsorship of King William Charles Lunalilo for "the poor, the destitute, the infirm, and the aged people of Hawaiian blood or extraction, giving preference to old people." Central Union Church on Beretania and Punahou streets was completed in 1924 on property that belonged to the Dillingham homestead.

== Notable residents ==
- Ferdinand Marcos and his wife Imelda Romualdez Marcos lived in the Makiki Heights area after being overthrown in the 1986 People Power Revolution.
- Bruno Mars, singer, alumnus of President Theodore Roosevelt High School
- Brian Schatz, U.S. Senator for Hawaii, resides in the district.
