= Lunalilo Home =

Hawaiian charity

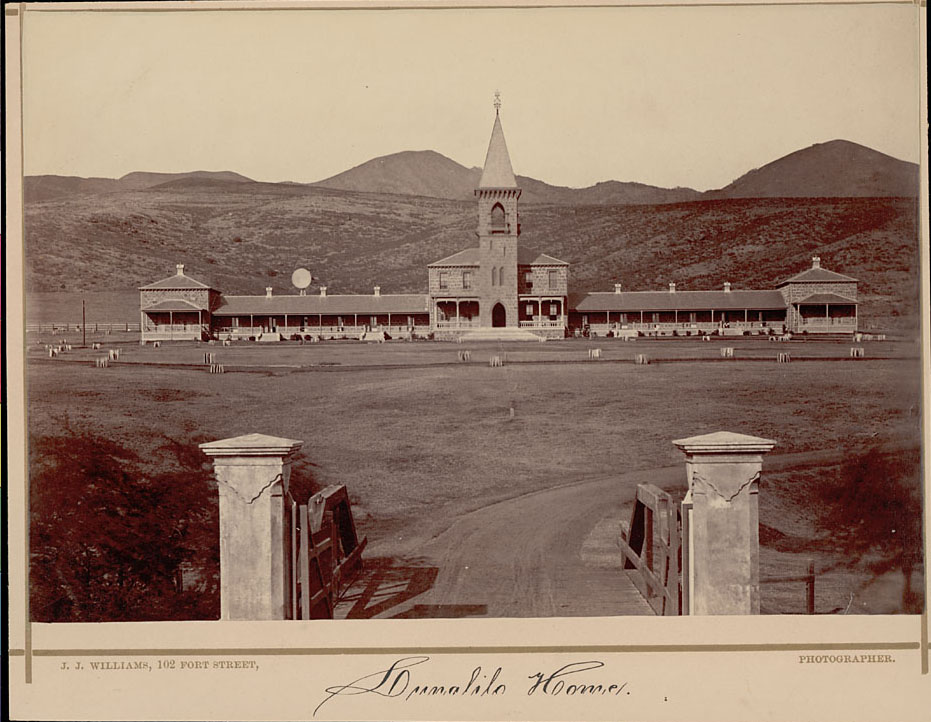
Lunalilo Home photographed in 1885

Lunalilo Home is a Hawaiian charity that provides community living service for the elderly in need of assistance. The charity serves also other Native Hawaiian people struggling with poverty.

== History ==
The charity was founded by the will of Lunalilo who died in 1874. The trustees of the charity would be picked by the judges of the Supreme Court of Hawaii. Lunalilo Home was established in 1883 and was originally located in Makiki. Originally there were 53 residents. For 12 years, beginning in 1889, Maria J. Forbes served as manager of Lunalilo Home.
