= Maria J. Forbes =

Kamaʻāina and Lunalilo Home manager

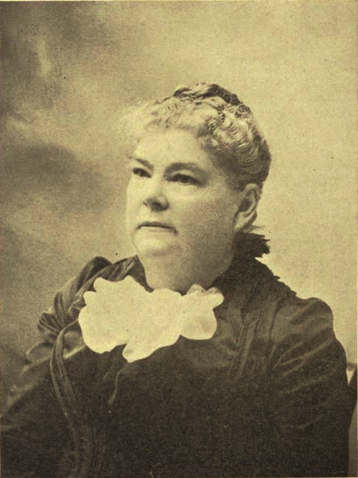
Maria Jane Chamberlain Forbes (1899)

Maria J. Forbes (née Chamberlain; 1832-1909) was a Kamaʻāina and the manager of Lunalilo Home, a Hawaiian charity and retirement home. She was the first child in the family of Levi Chamberlain to be born in the Chamberlain House.

== History ==
Maria Jane Chamberlain was born in Honolulu, Oahu, on April 25, 1832. Her father was Levi Chamberlain, one of the pioneer American missionaries to the Hawaiian Islands. Her mother, Maria (née, Patton), had been one of the third company of missionaries who reached Honolulu in the ship Parthian in 1828. The parents married in September of that same year. Maria Jane had six siblings. She was the first child in the family to be born in the Chamberlain House.

Forbes was one of five island girls who, after studying at Punahou School, Honolulu, pursued their education together at Mount Holyoke Female Seminary, Massachusetts, in the years 1850-53. In her third year, she gave up her course and went to Springfield to study music. She returned to Hawaii in 1854.

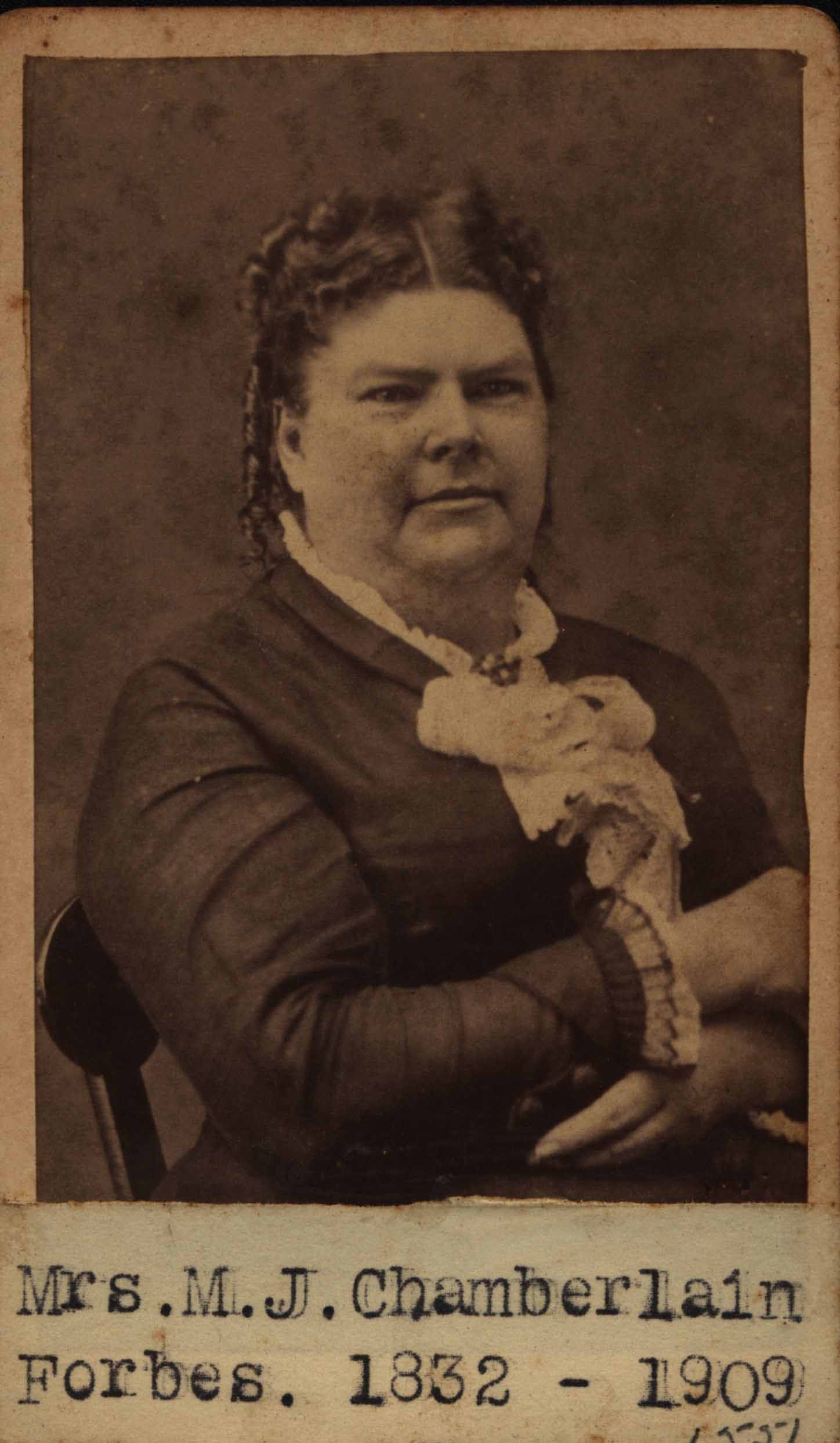
(undated)

In 1858, in Honolulu, she married another Kamaʻāina, Rev. Anderson Oliver Forbes, who was a missionary of the American Board. The earlier years of the married life of this couple were spent at Kalua'aha on the east coast of Molokai, Mr. Forbes for some years succeeding Rev. Harvey Rexford Hitchcock as missionary pastor of what at that time constituted an interesting portion of the Hawaiian field. Later, after other pastorates in Hilo and elsewhere in the Hawaiian Islands, Mr. Forbes was called, in 1880, to the secretaryship of the Hawaiian Board of Missions, and made his home in Honolulu. After years in this service, physicians prescribed travel for his health and while on return from the Eastern United States, he died in Colorado Springs, in 1888. In all his work for Hawaiians, Mrs. Forbes was his helper.

A year after she was widowed, Forbes was appointed the manager of the Lunalilo Home for aged and disabled Hawaiians in Honolulu. In 1901, sensible of the increasing infirmities of age, Forbes resigned and was succeeded by Mrs. Weaver.

Forbes had at least three children. Her later years were spent in her own home on Punahou Street. She died in Honolulu on January 22, 1909, age 77 years, and was buried in the old missionary ground at Kawaiahaʻo Church.
