= List of the oldest buildings in Hawaii =

This article lists the oldest extant buildings in Hawaii, including extant buildings and structures constructed prior to and during the United States rule over Hawaii. Only buildings built prior to 1880 are suitable for inclusion on this list, or the building must be the oldest of its type.

In order to qualify for the list, a structure must:

- be a recognizable building (defined as any human-made structure used or intended for supporting or sheltering any use or continuous occupancy);
- incorporate features of building work from the claimed date to at least 1.5 metres (4.9 ft) in height and/or be a listed building.

This consciously excludes ruins of limited height, roads and statues. Bridges may be included if they otherwise fulfill the above criteria. Dates for many of the oldest structures have been arrived at by radiocarbon dating or dendrochronology and should be considered approximate. If the exact year of initial construction is estimated, it will be shown as a range of dates.

== List of oldest buildings ==
Building	Image	Location	First built	Use	Notes
The Oldest Frame House (Ka Hale Lāʻau)		Honolulu, Hawaii	1821	Residence	Oldest frame house in Hawaii; boards were produced in New England and then shipped to Hawaii to be assembled for the mission house.
The Chamberlain House (Ka Hale Kamalani)		Honolulu, Hawaii	1831	Residence/Mission	Part of mission site, built from coral blocks cut from reefs offshore and lumber salvaged from ships.
Bailey House Museum		Wailuku, Hawaii	1833	House	Oldest house on Maui.
Mokuaikaua Church		Kailua-Kona, Hawaii	1835-1837	Church	Oldest church in Hawaii.
Huliheʻe Palace		Kailua-Kona, Hawaii	1838	Palace	built by governor Kuakini, and later purchased by King Kalākaua and Queen Kapiʻolani
Kawaiahaʻo Church		Honolulu, Hawaii	1836-1842	Church	At one time the national church of the Hawaiian Kingdom and chapel of the royal family
The Print House (Ka Hale Paʻi)		Honolulu, Hawaii	1841	Commercial	Site of first materials printed in the Hawaiian language
Cathedral Basilica of Our Lady of Peace		Honolulu, Hawaii	1843	Church	Oldest Roman Catholic church in Hawaii
Punahou School's Old School Hall		Honolulu, Hawaii	1851	School	
Melchers Building		Honolulu, Hawaii	1851	Commercial	Earliest commercial building in downtown Honolulu.

== See also ==
- National Register of Historic Places listings in Hawaii
- History of Hawaii
- Oldest buildings in the United States
