= Chamberlain House (Honolulu) =

Museum and library in Honolulu, Hawaii, US

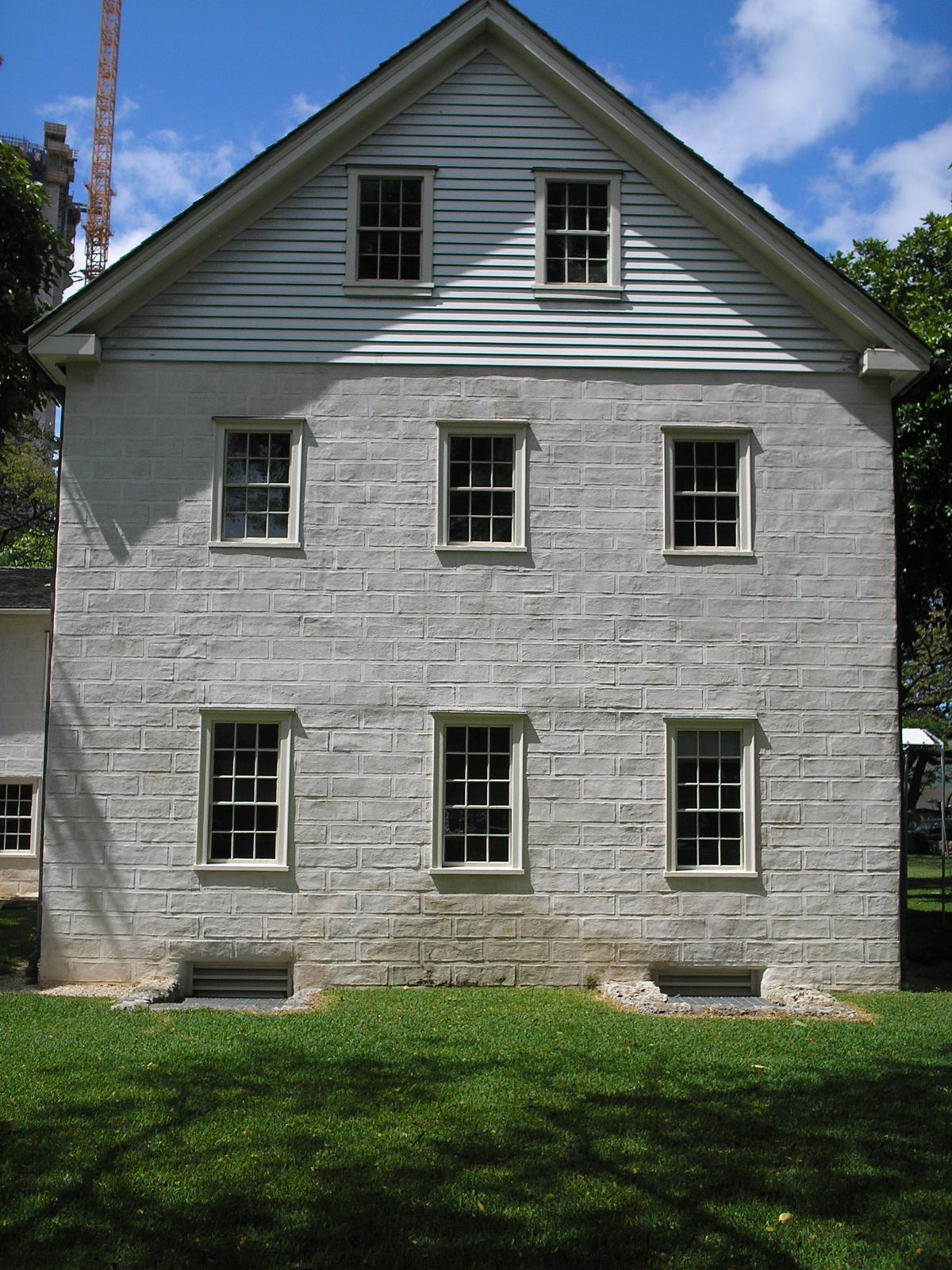
(2007)

The Chamberlain House (also known as Mission House) is an American museum and library, which originally served as a missionary home and office. It is located on King Street, in the rear of Kawaiahaʻo Church in Honolulu, Oahu, Hawaii. Construction occurred from 1828 to 1832 for a design by Levi Chamberlain, secular agent of the American Board of Commissioners for Foreign Missions (ABCFM) to the Hawaiian Islands. Along with other buildings in the immediate area, it is a part of the Hawaiian Mission Children's Society's Hawaiian Mission Houses Historic Site and Archives (1920), and includes designations of U.S. National Historic Landmark (1962) and National Register of Historic Places (1966).

== History ==
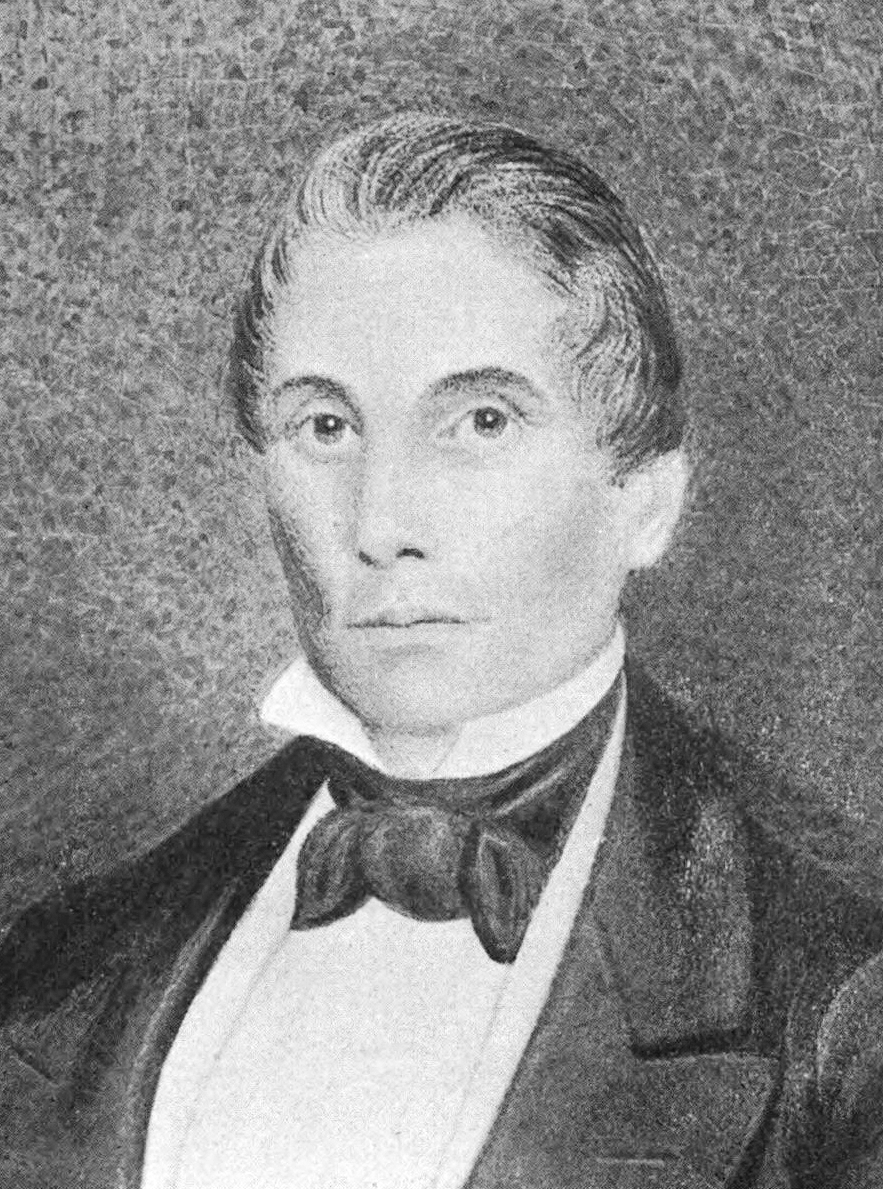
Levi Chamberlain (1845)

This house was built under the direction of Levi Chamberlain during the four years from 1828 to 1832. It was called the Depository because all good belonging to the mission were received and stored there, and from here were distributed to the various mission stations, until about 1840 when a separate Depository building was erected seaward of this house.

Levi Chamberlain, secular agent of the mission from 1823 to 1849, found that a grass house was not a safe place in which to store goods, so after his marriage in 1828 to Miss Maria Patton, a young woman who arrived that year in the third missionary company, he began to build. His third child, Maria Jane was the first to be born in the Chamberlain House.

The house was considered altogether too costly and pretentious by many at the time it was built and a great deal of disapproval was voiced. But it was soon seen that it was none too large as the missionaries and others from the outside islands were almost constant visitors. It was the Mission House; its agent resided there and from him, assistance and supplied were to be obtained. Frequently, a shipmaster bound for the Arctic would leave his wife with the Chamberlains until his return in the autumn, confident of her comfort and safety meanwhile. Rev. E. Bond, of Kohala, made the Chamberlain House his home when in Honolulu. At General Meeting time, he came in company with his daughter. Rev. J. D. Paris, of Kona, came often to the Chamberlain House. Mr. Abner Wilcox and his wife from Waioli, Kauai, were friends, who, when in Honolulu from time to time, made a tarrying at Mrs. Chamberlain's accommodating house. The Rev. D. B. Lyman, of Hilo, and members of his family may also be mentioned as often being at home at the Chamberlain House.

In 1903, the whole assembly of "Cousins" were happy when A. B. Clark spoke of a home for the Hawaiian Mission Children's Society, a regular place of meeting, and a safe place to deposit records and mementoes of the missionaries. Through the generosity of a Cousin, the records were stored in the stone office of the Old Mission Home, and by means of later gifts, this larger, insect-proof, fire-proof building was now assured.

A meeting of the Board of Managers was called by the president, G. R. Carter, for December 13, 1909, at which a paper was read stating that through the generosity of the Chamberlain heirs, the sons of C. M. Cooke in memory of their father, and of B. R. Banning, the old Chamberlain property had been bought and deeded to the Society. It was also stated that the Castles had secured the frame house adjoining the coral building and transferred it to the Cousins, thus making it possible to straighten Kawaiahao Lane and to add a part of the property into Kawaiahao churchyard.

Plans were submitted for the renovation of the building, showing the assembly room, stairway, dressing-room, pantry and kitchen below as well as above the museum and library. The veranda was to be taken away, leaving the front with its stone steps as originally built. All outside improvements were to be made at the back, where a lanai would extend from the coral house to the stone office.

By 1920, the House was restored. The woodwork, which had been riddled with borers, was replaced with new, the roof covered with asbestos shingles, and green shutters placed at the windows. The inside remained the same, with steep stairways, small-paned windows, a great attic, and low-ceiled kitchen. The services of Mr. Eskew, who did the restorative work on the Chamberlain House, were also secured for the restoration of the Adobe Schoolhouse (1920–21).

== Building materials ==
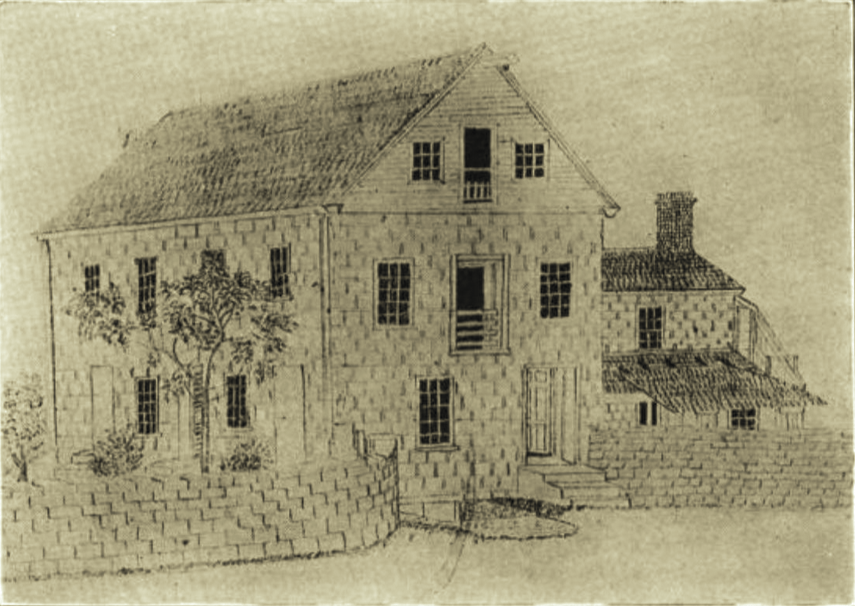
(ca. 1850)

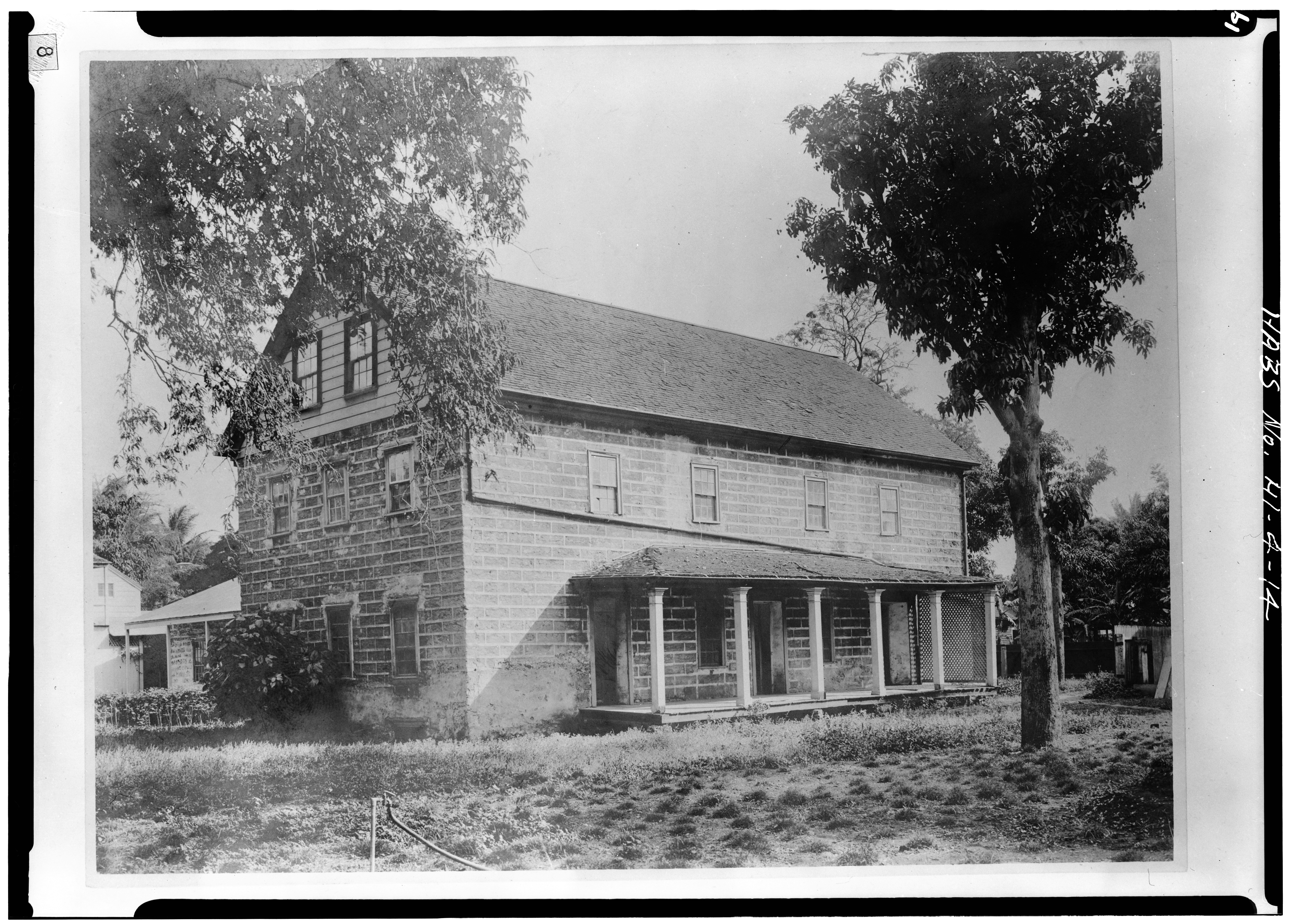
(1902)

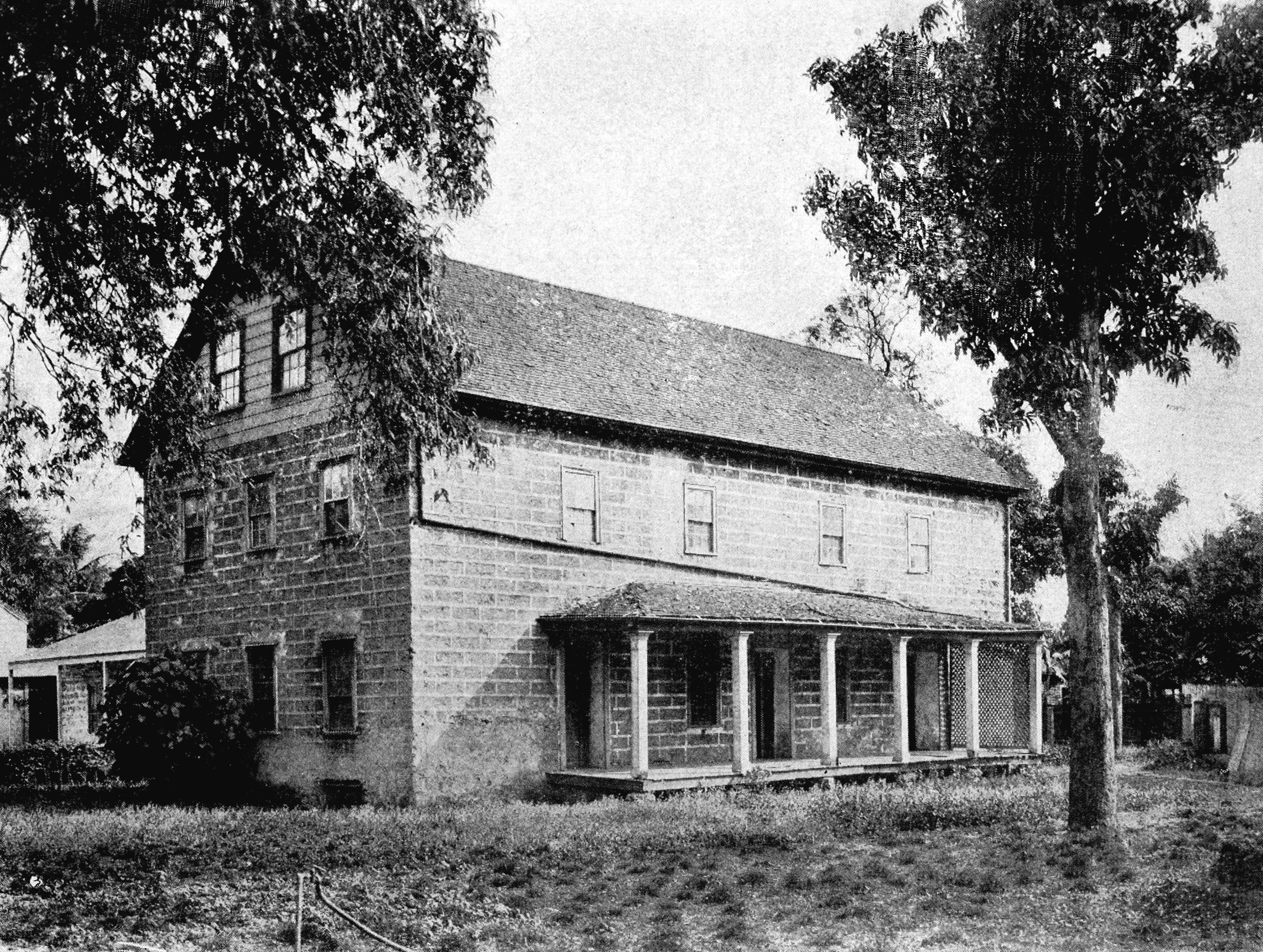
(1910)

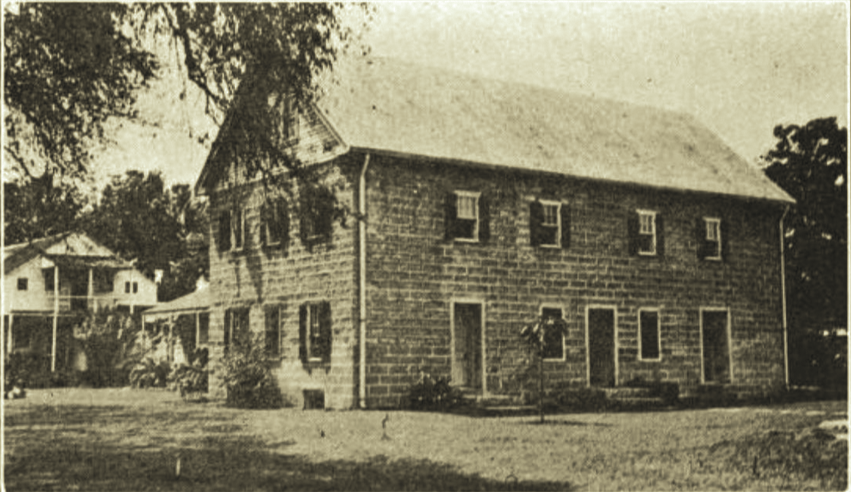
(1926)

There were no facilities for drawing stone in those days except by hand, therefore much time elapsed before all the stone was on hand to complete it. It required time to get all the lumber and shingles which had to come around Cape Horn. As it was a matter of accommodation only that whalers should take any freight they would, of course, take only small lots of lumber, and it required several vessels to bring sufficient for the house. Also, mechanics and carpenters were not abundant, and one or two competent men, mason and carpenter, had a long job at the work. The lumber of the house, and of all old Mission buildings, was of the best character, being of white pine which came from the State of Maine. The lumber of the house has remained in place now, very close to eighty years, and is damaged and deteriorated, not so much from age as from the ravages of ants and insects which have gotten into and multiplied upon these Islands during the past fifteen or twenty years.

The material of this house was obtained from the coral reef seaward, being cut out by natives in blocks of the required size with axes supplied for that purpose, and it was current among the people that a new axe could be had in exchange for one that had been otherwise in use for some time, its edge thereby being blunted, so making it more suitable for working in the coral stone. The transportation of the large blocks, cut out and prepared to the required size at the reef, were carried by men on their shoulders by means of ropes and a pole, or shoulder-stick inserted that two strong natives could lift and convey between them the burden for a long distance, as was their ordinary method before the introduction of bullock and wheel conveyances.

A deep and large pit was excavated not far from the house for a lime kiln. The stone was brought from the seaside in containers upon the shoulders of men, and when layers of wood, cut from the mountain forest, or wherever obtainable, had been placed in suitable quantity, the stones to be burned for the lime were spread over and heaped upon the fuel to a considerable height above. The center pole was withdrawn and fire communicated to the deepest part of the pit by throwing in live coals to reach the light combustibles at the bottom, from whence the entire mass of fuel was in time burned up, the heat therefrom reducing the stones resting above to the required lime for mortar.

They were put together with a lime mortar made by burning coral. The woodwork, good white pine, was brought from Maine around Cape Horn, though the beams came from the Oahu mountains, hauled down by man power, and were supplemented by driftwood. A ship's mast formed one of the beams in the cellar. This pine woodwork, injured by borers, was replaced in 1920, without altering the original New England design.

== Architecture and fittings ==
The house is two stories high, 562 feet (171 m) long and 27 feet (8.2 m) wide, with a cellar and attic of the same dimensions for storage. With its three front doors facing on Kawaiahao Street, and its two deep-set windows, with four windows of the same size above, it presents a somewhat austere appearance.

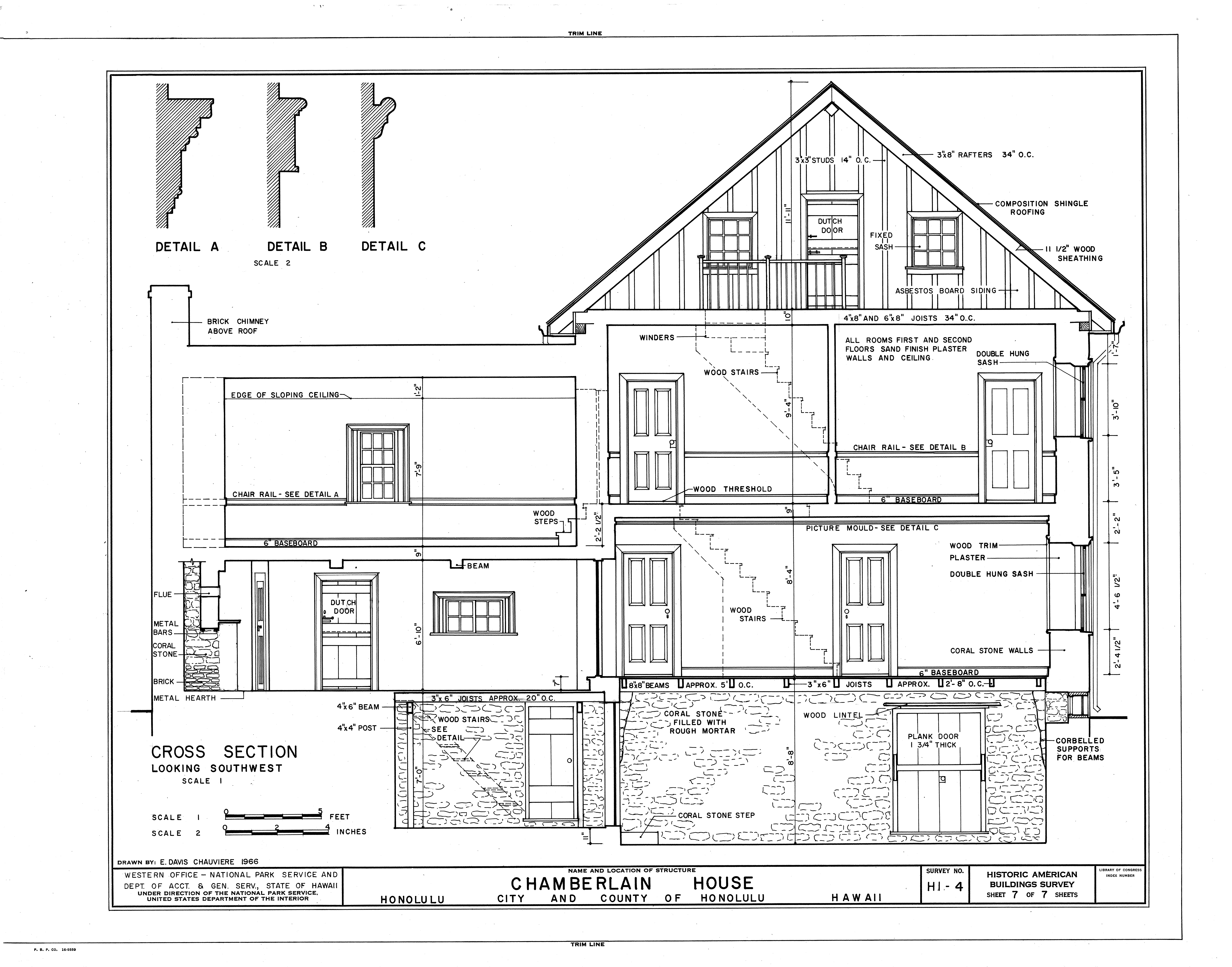
Cross-section looking southwest

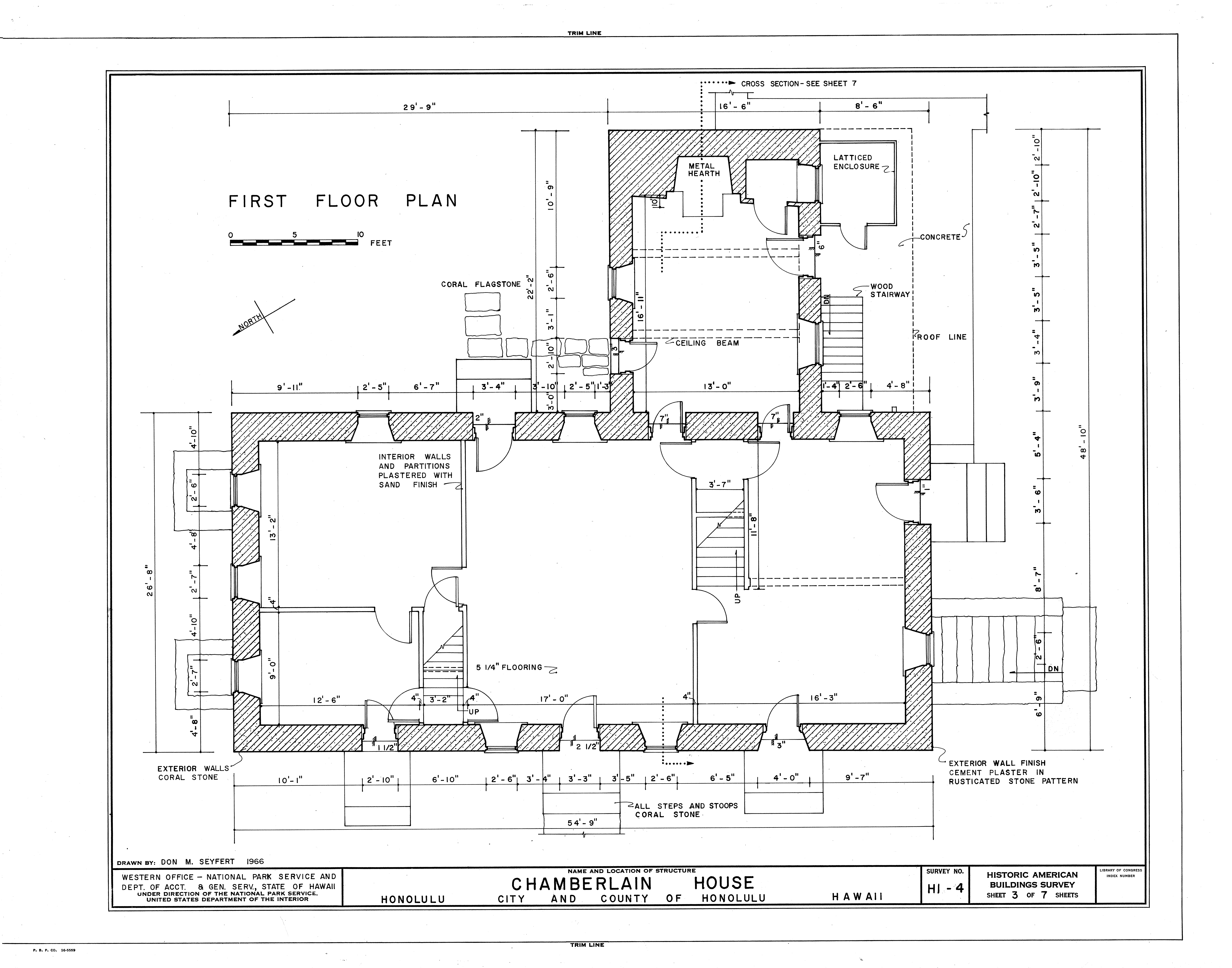
First floor plan

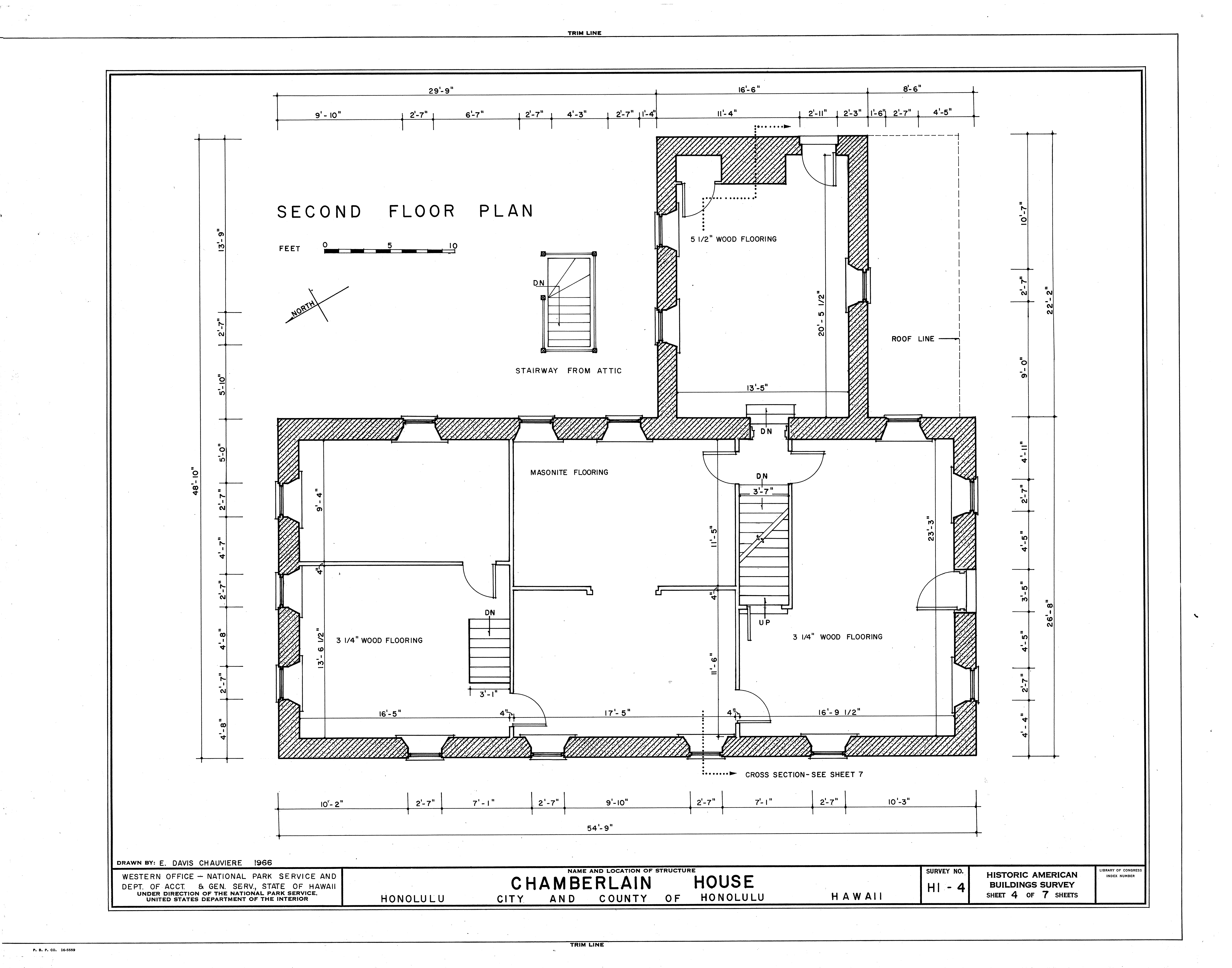
Second floor plan

The parlor, where prayer-meetings as well as public and private receptions were held, was entered by the middle one of these deep, open doors, and another outside door opposite opened to the shady court between this building and the printing office. Doors led from this to the dining room, the kitchen and the family rooms, and the three windows gave sufficient light. The room was plainly furnished.

The house contained relics from the various mission families. From the parlor, one enters seaward the dining room where a koa table stood. One door leads from this room out to the well under the tamarind tree, and another opens, with one step down, into the kitchen. The kitchen has a low ceiling, two small, deep-set windows, and a New England fireplace with hanging crane, pots and kettles, tongs and irons. A kitchen safe stands in the same corner where Mrs. Levi Chamberlain baked. The doors, one opening to the trade-wind from the mountains and the other to a brick-paved lanai near the tamarind tree, keep the kitchen cool. From this lanai, coral steps lead down to the huge cellar below.

The second floor of the House is reached from the dining-room by a very steep stairway, and from the small platform above, three doors open out. The large room to the right was Mr. Chamberlain's office. Here the accounts of the mission were kept, letters received and answered from missionaries on the other islands and from Boston, and orders were filled for all kinds of merchandise. Hundreds of these letters were stored in the Cousins' vault in the Mission Memorial Building, with account books dating back to 1823. Much business connected with the Hawaiian kingdom was planned and discussed in this room, and many events of historical interest were registered. Over the parlor, the room on the Waikiki side, which was occupied by Mr. Castle, who kept the books. In this room were two small single beds, occupied at night by the two younger boys of the family, the eldest two being in the U. S. The room over the kitchen was occupied by Mr. E. O. Hall, whose business was to fill orders, and who had access to the whole house, from the garret, where all light goods, tinware, crockery, etc., were opened, to the cellar, containing the molasses barrel, the whale-oil for lamps, the lumber pile and the unopened goods of the mission.

Dry goods and small staple articles of merchandise were kept on shelves in this room, but larger supplies were stored in the cellar or carried to the attic by tackle and pulley. A doorway was left in the gable end, both of the attic and second floor room, through which the goods were carried. A wooden grating protected this doorway where visitors often came to get an unobstructed view of the sea when vessels were entering or leaving the harbor.

A stairway from this room leads to the attic, where at General Meeting time, in May and June of each year, mats were spread for the boy guests at night, and here in the midst of boxes, barrels and bundles, the children would come to play "I spy.” The two rooms at the left on the second floor were fitted up as guest rooms.

Returning to the first floor, is the family rooms at the mauka end (toward the mountains) used as a museum filled with such treasures as the old civil war flags from Waimea; the pictures of the second generation of "Cousins" or Mission children on the picture pillar (a device invented by the Mission's first Recorder); Dr. Judd's old medicine chest; the much traveled rocking chair of Mother Thurston; and in the smaller room, a wardrobe full of the garb of other days, chiefly from the Lyman family; the Lyman cradle; and the Bond family bookcase with treasures from the old Kohala home. The little room above this contains furniture from the Lyons' and other Mission homes, and the further room served for several years as the office and workshop of the Historical Commission of Hawaii.

From these little upper rooms, a steep stairway leads to the parlor below.

== Hawaiian Mission Children's Society Library ==
Three upper rooms later became the Carter Library, or, as George R. Carter preferred to have it called, The Hawaiian Mission Children's Society Library, with a continual overflow into the fourth room, over the kitchen, which is three steps down from the library proper and is entered by the third door at the head of the stairs. This fourth room is 20–13 feet (6.1–4.0 m) and is cool by reason of the two windows opening toward the trade-wind and one toward the sea. There is a door opposite the entrance that formerly led to a platform and stairway built between this house and the old printing office. The stairway was taken away and the doorway frames a view of Diamond Head as seen through tall coconut trees. The room was early occupied by E. O. Hall who, after his return from Oregon where he introduced printing, assisted in the work of the Depository.

The library of Hawaiiana is a collection almost unique in its concentration upon the history of Hawaii and especially of the Protestant Mission. Here are included the voyages of the navigators to the Pacific; the early little editions of Obookiah's life; some of the earliest sheets and books issued at the Mission press; many editions of the Hawaiian Bible; hymn books and school primers in Hawaiian, also priceless prints; many of the copperplate engravings made under the instruction of Rev. Lorrin Andrews at Lahainaluna school in the thirties; two thousand books; as many pamphlets; and more of both not yet catalogued. Valuable Mission journals, letters and reports, also a part of this collection are stored in the vault in the Mission Memorial Building across the street. The Library was at one time directed by Professor Howard M. Ballou, the collaborator and collector of nine-tenths of the books for Mr. Carter. Rev. B. T. Sheeley was for some years the librarian.

== Grounds ==
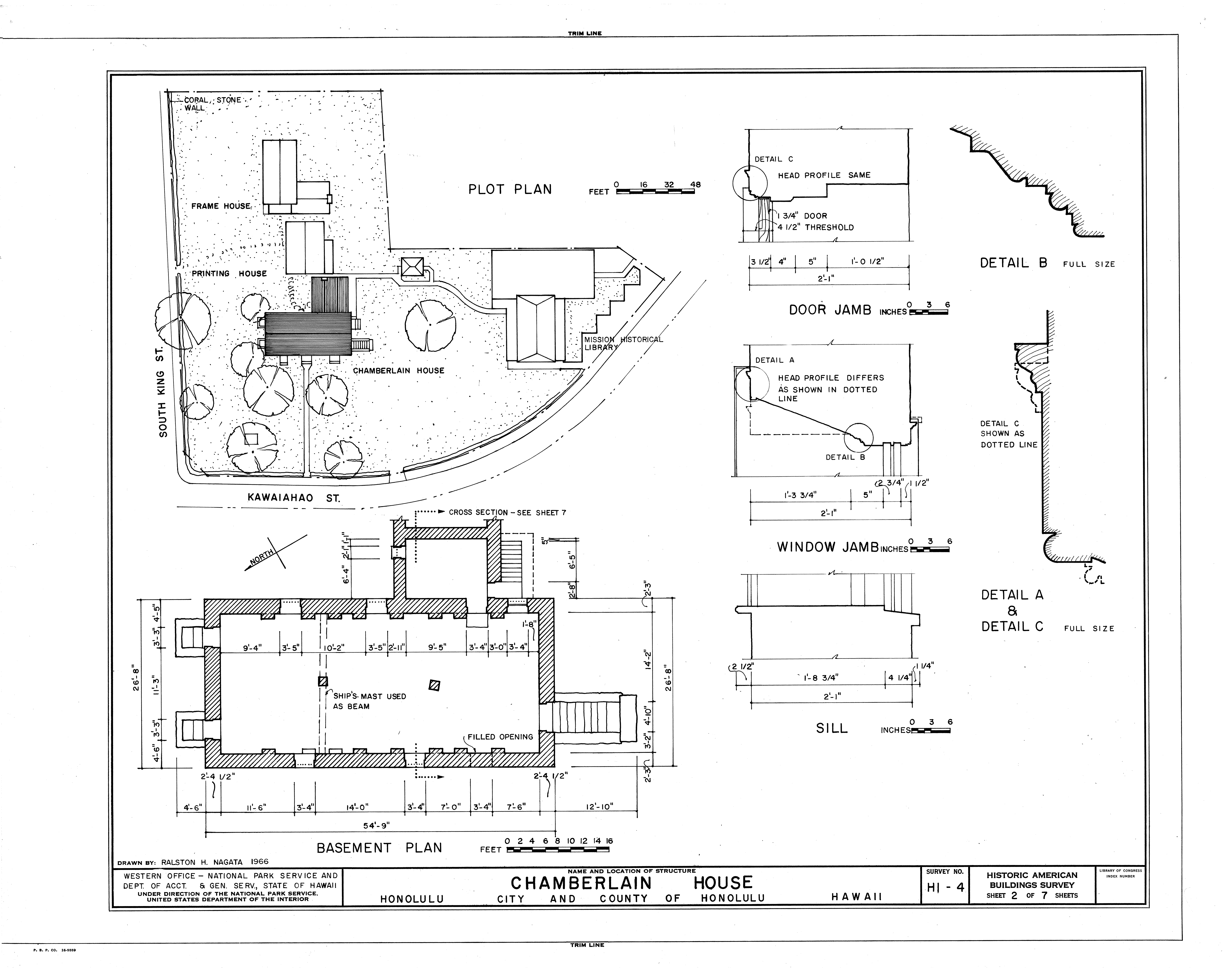
Plot plan

The front entrance from King Street in the earlier times was by a gate from the street, and a pathway that led directly to the parlor door on the east side of the stone house. In later times, this entrance was walled up and a gate and pathway made from King street extending to the veranda door of the reception room on the west side. Originally there were no verandas to the house. The later arrangement was made by Mrs. Chamberlain after the property was transferred to her personally, by the ABCFM in the 1850s or early 60s.

Passing through the open front door is the grassy lawn, under shade trees, the old Kawaiahao Church; mauka, across the way, the Mission Memorial, headquarters of the continued work of the mission, including the Church of the Crossroads for the younger generation; makai of Kawaiahao Church, the old Mission School House, later the headquarters for the Free Kindergarten Association; makai of this, the Kakaako Mission; and around to the east again, the Kaiulani Home for Girls; and across the street, the Theological Seminary, all clustered around the Old Mission Home and near the civic center of Honolulu.

A coral stone wall surrounded the yard of this house, being 7.5 feet (2.3 m), more or less, in height. Before the eldest two sons left for the U.S., in 1836, there was no separating fence between this place and that occupied by the Bingham family adjacent. An adobe house, thatched with native "pili" grass was built in the front yard and was used for the accommodation of guests and sojourners. It was occupied at times by Rev. Asa Thurston and his wife, when in Honolulu from their station at Kailua, Hawaii; also by Rev. Samuel Whitney and his wife of Waimea, Kauai, who was a friend of Mr. Chamberlain, whose mother was of that name. Mr. Whitney's son, Henry M., made his first home here on his return to Honolulu, in 1850. Their first child, Hervey, was born in this house.

A second accommodation house was built in the "makai" yard, and was used by a member of the family and afforded a place of abode when he was in town from his country place.

Two wells of water, somewhat brackish, furnished requirements as needed for the kitchen and also for bathing and other purposes. The water being hard, made laundry work irksome, but it was accomplished in some way. Coolers were used for making the water more drinkable. But Mrs. Chamberlain possessed the skill to use this water in making, with scalded milk and Kona coffee, a drink so good that the guests praised it. The first well was adjacent to the kitchen, supplying also a bathing-house near. The second well was in the front yard, its location being now marked by a mound of earth planted over with flowers and so forth.

In the early times, before water had been brought down from the mountain streams and irrigation established, it was possible to take in a view from the garret windows of the Chamberlain House across the wide and dusty plain to Punahou and beyond, with hardly a house or a tree to intervene. On the seaward side and toward Diamond Head were salt marshes in which rushes thrived and gave much support to Mission cows. The height of the house made the lookout from the "mauka" windows, and from the guarded door which was on the seaward side, to be continually visited to see the incoming of sailing craft approaching the harbor or leaving it, and to learn the class of vessels, whether national, merchant, whaling, island or other, and to be made aware of the country represented by its flag, and other information to be obtained by means of a large spy-glass.

== Flora ==
A large "hau" tree with bright yellow flowers was early noticeable in the yard, and a "Pride of India" by the west corner of the house was an ornament to the place. A very large "algaroba" tree near the Mission cemetery was noticeable, being perhaps the first planted in that yard. A tamarind tree was laden yearly with its fruit-pods. Two large mango trees produced fruit. The black lava sand is a congenial soil for the growth of a variety of fruit-bearing and ornamental trees. Before the arrival of insect pests, fig trees producing their fruit were seen. But little attention was given to such things as flowers and fruits.
