= Melchers Building =

Coordinates: 21.309458°N 157.863354°W

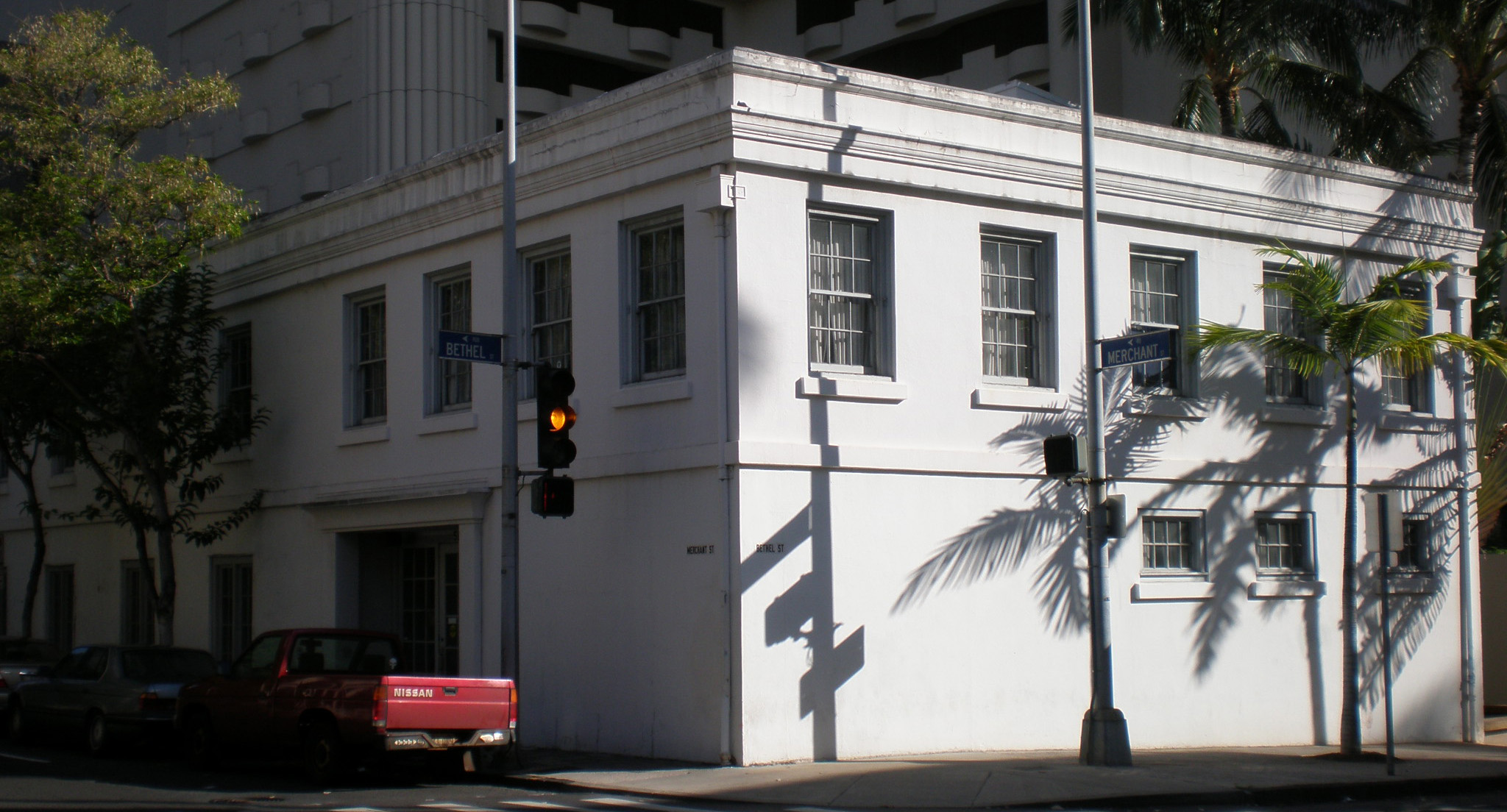
The Melchers Building in Honolulu

The Melchers Building is a historic commercial building in Downtown Honolulu, Hawaii. Located at 51 Merchant Street, it is the oldest commercial building in Honolulu. Designed in the Classical Revival style by an unknown architect, it was constructed in 1854 of white coral blocks. The original structure's qualities are no longer visible beneath outer layers of stucco and paint.

The building's structure is similar to other commercial 19th Century buildings in Honolulu. The Melchers Building is a simple structure just 400 feet from the ocean, with two floors and minimal ornamentation.

Its original purpose was to house the offices of Gustav C. Melchers and Gustav Reiner, traders who were originally from Bremen. Subsequently, it served for a time as the office of the City Prosecutor. At one point, the windows along the Merchant Street side were bricked up and an iron frame was placed around the door. The bricked windows and blocked doorway have since been removed and the building is now in use as an office annex by the City and County of Honolulu.

The building is a contributing property to the Merchant Street Historic District.

== See also ==
- List of the oldest buildings in Hawaii
