= Levi Chamberlain =

American Protestant missionary

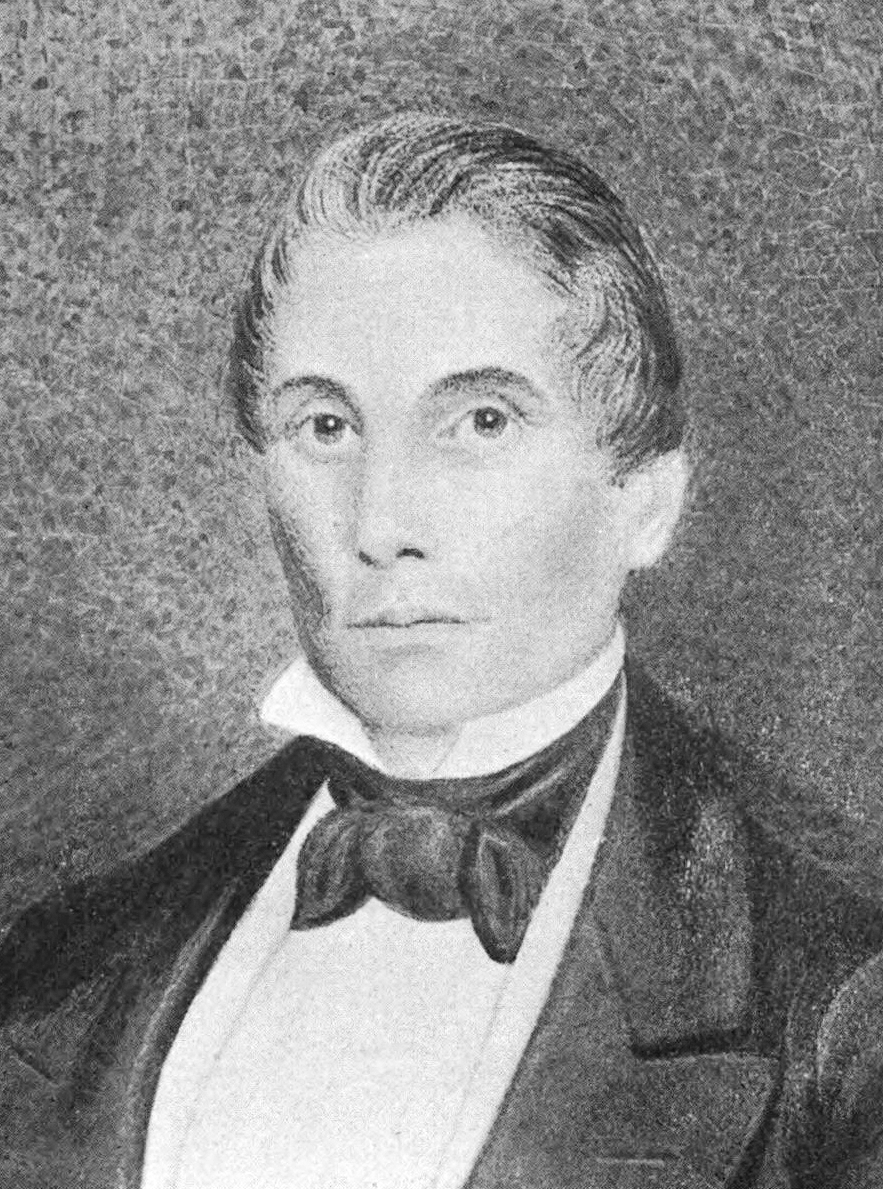
(1845)

Levi Chamberlain (Hawaiian name, Mikamalena; 1792–1849) was an American Protestant missionary, teacher of penmanship, and examiner of the native schools in Hawaii, as well as an expert accountant. He served as secular agent of the Sandwich Islands Mission, in the service of the American Board of Commissioners for Foreign Missions (ABCFM). He is the namesake of the Chamberlain House in Honolulu, Hawaii, which he designed.

== Early life and education ==
Levi Chamberlain was born in Wardsborough, South District (now Dover), Vermont August 28, 1792. His parents were Joseph Chamberlain and Lucy Whitney.

His father dying in 1800, the child, at the age of eight years, was taken to live in the family of an uncle, a prosperous merchant of Boston. Quite early, he began serving a mercantile apprenticeship under this relative, remaining until 1817.

== Career ==
=== Massachusetts ===
In 1817, Chamberlain and another young man formed a partnership and went into business on their own account as a dry-goods dealer in Boston (Chamberlain and Holbrook), for the sale of goods imported from India and China. The young firm prospered and a brilliant future was assured it.

Chamberlain joined the Park Street Church in 1818 and some time after this, a strong desire to engage in missionary work took possession of him. After consulting with his friends over a proposed move, he sold his interest in the business to his partner in 1821 and entered Andover Theological Seminary. Thereafter, and for some years, he was engaged in the treasury department of the ABCFM in Boston and it was thought that Chamberlain would ultimately become treasurer of this institution.

=== Hawaii ===
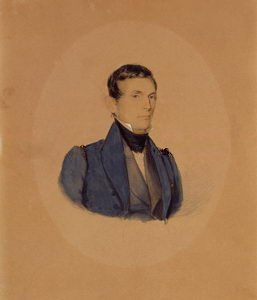
Levi Chamberlain, watercolor by Alfred Thomas Agate

However, his health failing him, it was considered best that Chamberlain would accompany the first reinforcements to the Sandwich Islands mission. Placing what little property he then possessed into the use of the missionary cause, he set sail out of New Haven, Connecticut, November 19, 1822, with the second company of missionaries as a layman, arriving at Honolulu, April 27, 1823. The post assigned Chamberlain was a difficult one. It entailed much responsibility and arduous work, but in discharge of these duties, he would secure the success of the mission.

It was part of his duties to assist the outlying mission stations in obtaining supplies and in transacting the financial operations that these scattered stations called for. He found upon his arrival in Honolulu that the transportation of passengers and freight for these missions on the outlying islands was a matter of great difficulty and so informed his superiors on the American Board.

In the year 1826, the American schooner, Missionary Packet, reached Honolulu, having been sent out to the islands by the American Board in answer to their financial agent's appeal.

He wrote to the board for an assistant, as his duties by this time were too much for one pair of shoulders and in 1831, Mr. Andrew Johnstone arrived for this work. But he proved unsuitable for the task. A Mr. French, a merchant of Honolulu, was given charge of the ship. But the operation of the Missionary Packet in the interisland traffic was abandoned in 1837 and she was sold.

During these years, Chamberlain lived in a grass house located near the present site of the Castle Memorial Kindergarten on King street. In addition to his business tasks he devoted long and wearisome days to the examination of the native schools. Three times he made the complete circuit, afoot, of Oahu in the course of his tours of inspection. Being an excellent penman, he was called upon to instruct the more advanced native scholars in this art. Among the first of his pupils was Haalilio, who was afterwards private secretary to Kamehameha III.

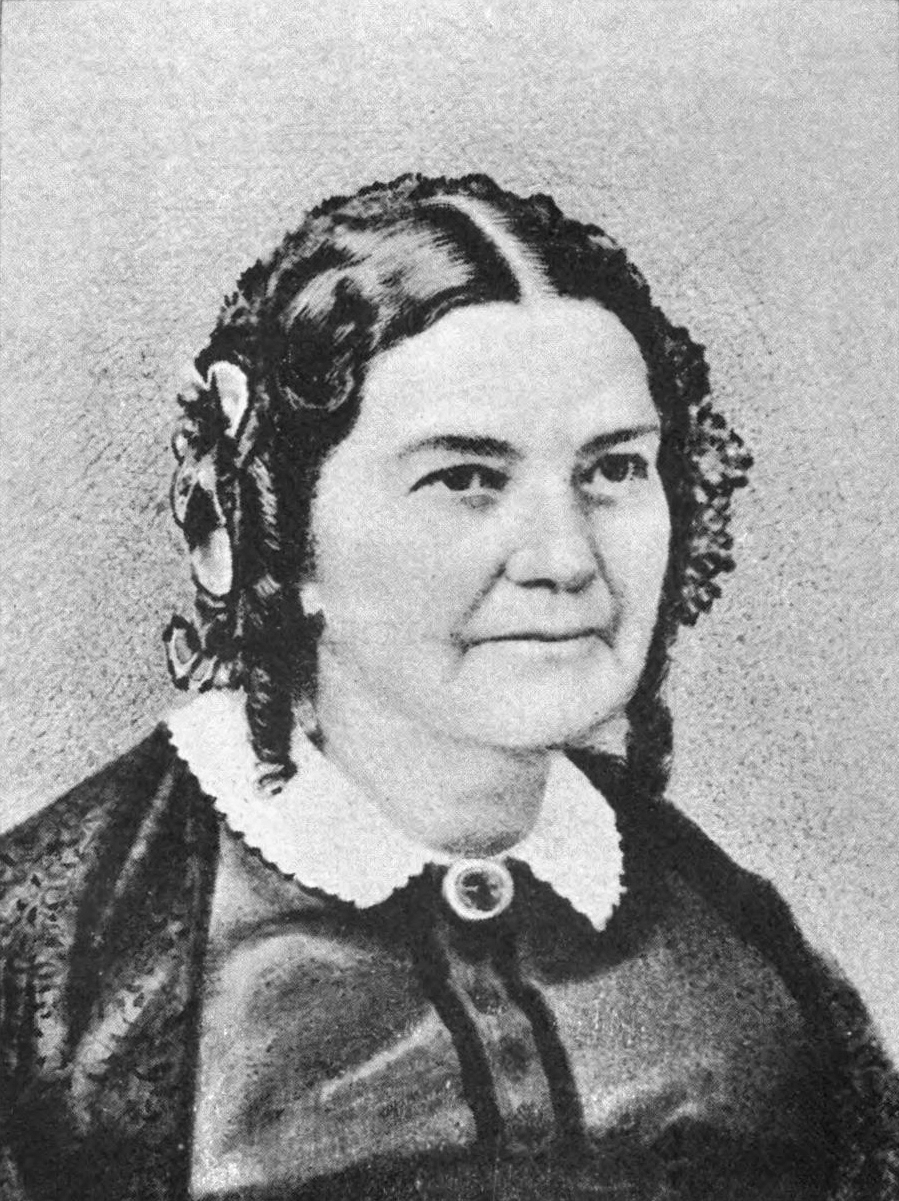
Maria Patton Chamberlain (1865)

Chamberlain married Maria Patton (born Salisbury, Pennsylvania, March 3, 1803) at Lahaina, Maui, September 1, 1828, officiated by the Rev. Lorrin Andrews. Miss Patton had been one of the third company of missionaries who reached Honolulu in the ship Parthian, March 30 of that same year. Bringing his bride to Honolulu, they lived in a thatched house until the coral stone Chamberlain House was completed in 1831.

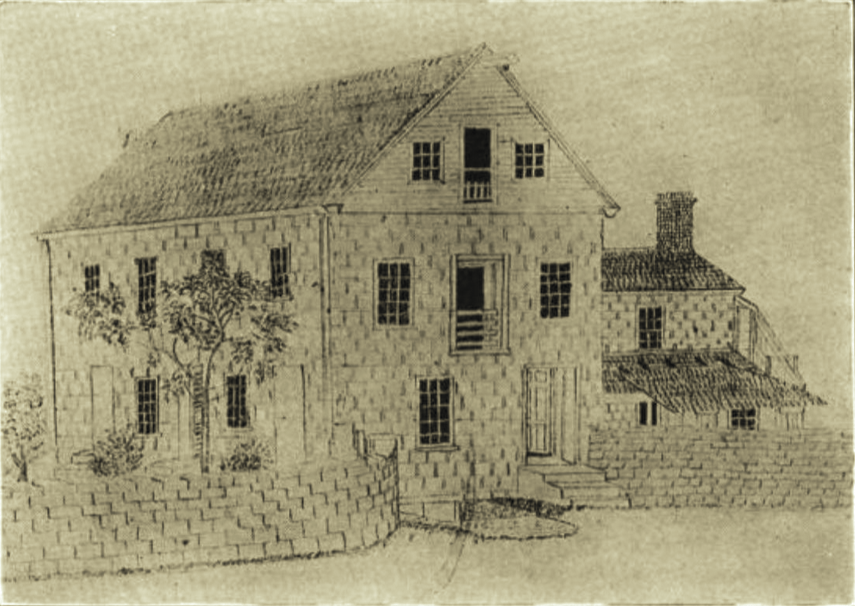
Chamberlain House

Two sons were born to the young couple in the grass house in which they resided while their stone house was being completed. A third child, a daughter, afterwards Mrs. Maria J. Forbes, was born in the new edifice in 1832, which is the year in which it was first occupied.

This house was considered altogether too costly and pretentious by many at the time it was built and a great deal of disapproval was voiced. But it was soon seen that it was not too large. The missionaries and others from the outside islands were almost constant visitors. It was the Mission House; its agent resided there and from him assistance and supplies were to be obtained. Frequently a ship master bound for the Arctic would leave his wife with the Chamberlains until his return in the autumn, confident of her comfort and safety meanwhile.

It was decided in 1836 that the two eldest sons of the family should be sent to the states for their education. They were to go to New London, Connecticut, in charge of the Rev. Mr. Parker. Mr. Chamberlain went outside the reef in the ship to see the two young sons off, and when he was being rowed ashore, the parting from his two sons, the eldest of whom was but seven, was too much for his self-control. He broke down and wept until the landing was reached.

A very significant incident is related by the Rev. J. S. Emerson. A Hawaiian sub-chief named Ukeke told him that a certain stretch of land through which they happened to be riding on the north end of Oahu had been given by Kaahumanu to Chamberlain while he was on one of his periodical tours of examining and inspecting the schools of which he was superintendent for the islands. The queen and her retinue had gone along on one of these trips to show by example the approval which the chiefs had given the "Palapala," or book learning. Chamberlain respectfully declined the proffered gift of land stating that his coming to Hawaii was for the purpose of teaching the people the true word of God and not for any personal gain.

Chamberlain's work was not restricted to the secular concerns of the mission. His correspondence with his brethren of the mission, and his patrons at home, touched upon many vital interests, noted for its quantity, its matter, and the neatness and accuracy of its execution. His experience, judgment, and piety gave him influence with his brethren as a counselor. He devoted time to the examination of native schools. Being proficient in penmanship, he taught the art to the more advanced of the native pupils. Among his first pupils was Haʻalilio, who afterwards became the king's secretary, and his ambassador to the United States, England, and France.

== Personal life and death ==
In the year 1845, Mr. Chamberlain was induced to try a voyage to China for the benefit of his health which, never robust, was now failing. He then continued on to the United States by way of older sons in New England. After Mazatlan, Mexico, meeting his two sons after an absence of 18 months. He returned to the islands in 1847 where he experienced increasing debility.

Early in 1849, he suffered a hemorrhage, from the effects of which he never entirely recovered. He lingered slowly for six months, before he died on July 29, 1849, at the age of 56 years. His wife and seven children, Warren, Jeremiah, Maria, Martha, James, Levi, Isabella, survived him.

Chamberlain's gravestone in the Mission Cemetery, sent through the ABCFM, bears the inscription "In Memory of Levi Chamberlain, for 26 years a Secular Agent of the Sandwich Islands Mission, in the service of the ABCFM, who died July 29, 1849, aged 56 years, 11 months.

Chamberlain's original journals are held by the Hawaiian Mission Houses Historic Site and Archives in Honolulu. Their transcripts are held in the Beinecke Rare Book & Manuscript Library at Yale University.
