= Hawaiian Mission Houses Historic Site and Archives =

Museum in Honolulu, Hawaii, United States

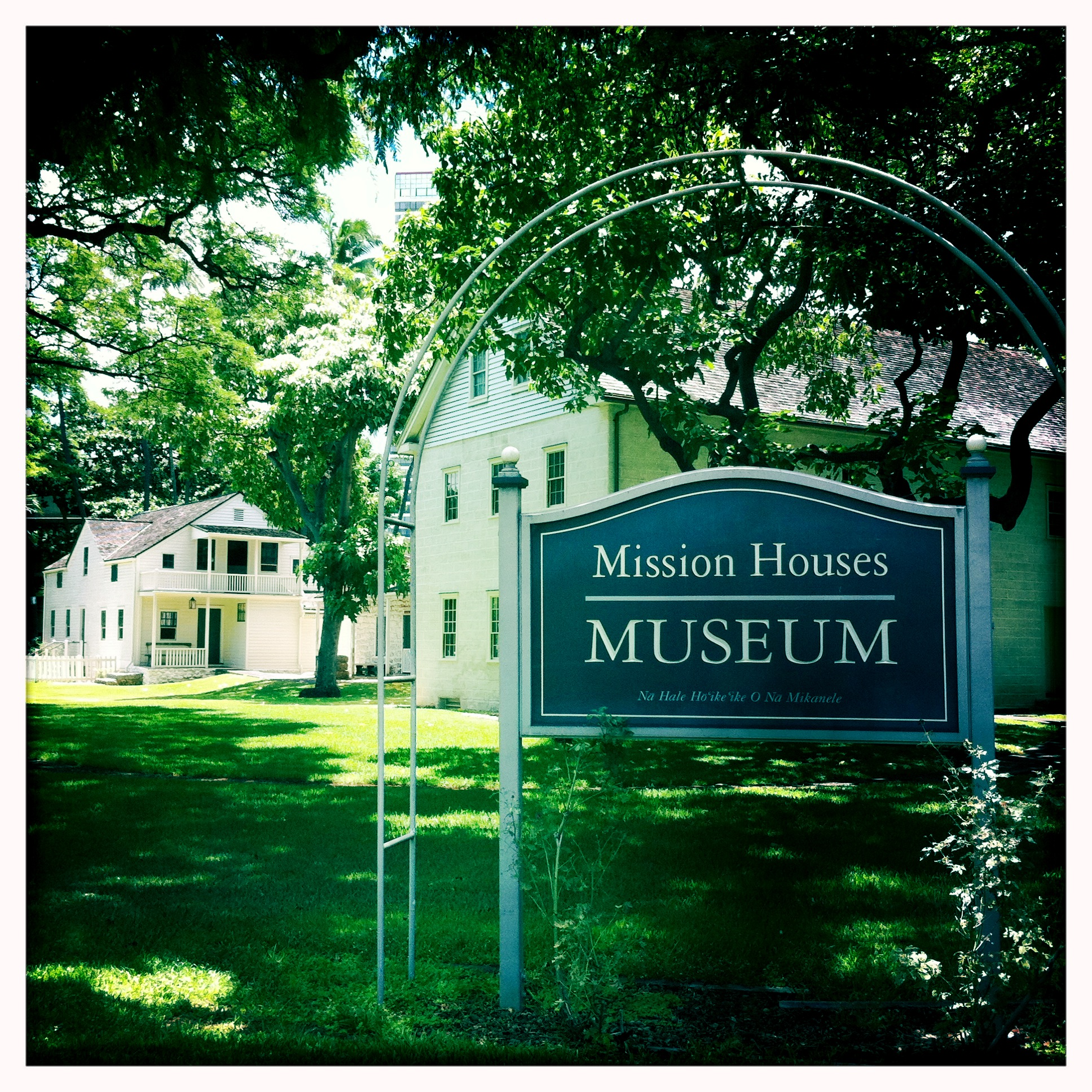
- Established: 1920
- Location: 553 South King Street, Honolulu, Hawaii
- Coordinates: 21.3040°N 157.8570°W
- Website: https://www.missionhouses.org/

The Hawaiian Mission Houses Historic Site and Archives in Honolulu, Hawaii, was established in 1920 by the Hawaiian Mission Children's Society, a private, non-profit organization and genealogical society, on the 100th anniversary of the arrival of the first Christian missionaries in Hawaiʻi. In 1962, the Mission Houses, together with Kawaiahaʻo Church, both built by those early missionaries, were jointly designated a U.S. National Historic Landmark (NHL). In 1966 all the NHLs were included in the National Register of Historic Places.

The Hawaiian Mission Houses Historic Site and Archives collects, preserves, interprets, and exhibits documents, artifacts, and other records of Hawaii's "missionary" period from about 1820 to 1863. It interprets its historic site and collections and makes these collections available for research, educational purposes, and public enjoyment. The archive's collection holds over 3,000 Hawaiian, Western, and Pacific artifacts, and more than 12,000 books, manuscripts, original letters, diaries, journals, illustrations and Hawaiian church records.

The Hawaiian Mission Houses has an ongoing digitization project. As part of this effort, after the devastating 2023 fire in Lāhainā they have uploaded items relevant to Lāhainā's history, such as photos, journals, drawings, and letters, to aid in the eventual recovery of the historic town.

== Houses ==
The evolution of Mission House architecture illustrates the progressive adaptation of missionaries from New England to the climate, culture, and building materials they encountered in the Sandwich Islands.

The houses are supposedly haunted.

=== Oldest Frame House ===
The materials to build the Oldest Frame House (Ka Hale Lāʻau 'the wood house') arrived by ship around Cape Horn from Boston in 1821. They had already been measured and cut, ready to assemble into a frame house suitable for the climate of New England: with small windows to help keep the heat inside and short eaves so as not to risk cracking under a load of snow.

Though principally occupied by the seven members of Daniel Chamberlain's family, it often housed as many as five other missionary families, along with occasional ailing sailors or orphans. The small parlor served as a schoolhouse, and the basement served as the dining hall. The cookhouse was a separate building.

Among other exhibits in this structure is an authentic replica of Dr. Gerrit Judd's 1830's medical clinic. The office contains original furniture and objects, with many painstakingly researched and recreated items.

=== Chamberlain House ===
The Chamberlain House (Ka Hale Kamalani) was built in 1831 from materials procured locally: coral blocks cut from reefs offshore and lumber salvaged from ships. Designed by the mission's quartermaster, Levi Chamberlain, to hold supplies as well as people, it had two stories, an attic, and a cellar. The windows are larger, more numerous, and shuttered against the sun. The building now serves as the main exhibition hall for the Museum.

=== Print House ===
In 1841, a covered porch and balcony were added to the frame house, and an extra bedroom was built next door out of coral blocks. Both additions show further adaptation to an indoor-outdoor lifestyle appropriate to the climate. The extra coral building later became the mission's Print House (Ka Hale Paʻi) and now serves as a museum exhibit to show how the missionaries and native Hawaiians worked together to produce the first materials printed in the Hawaiian language.

=== Site grounds ===
The sites include the Kahua Ho'okipa outdoor stage, built from "coral blocks salvaged from the first courthouse in Hawaii, built in 1852." HMH schedules programming on historic cultural activities held on the stage.

== Gallery ==
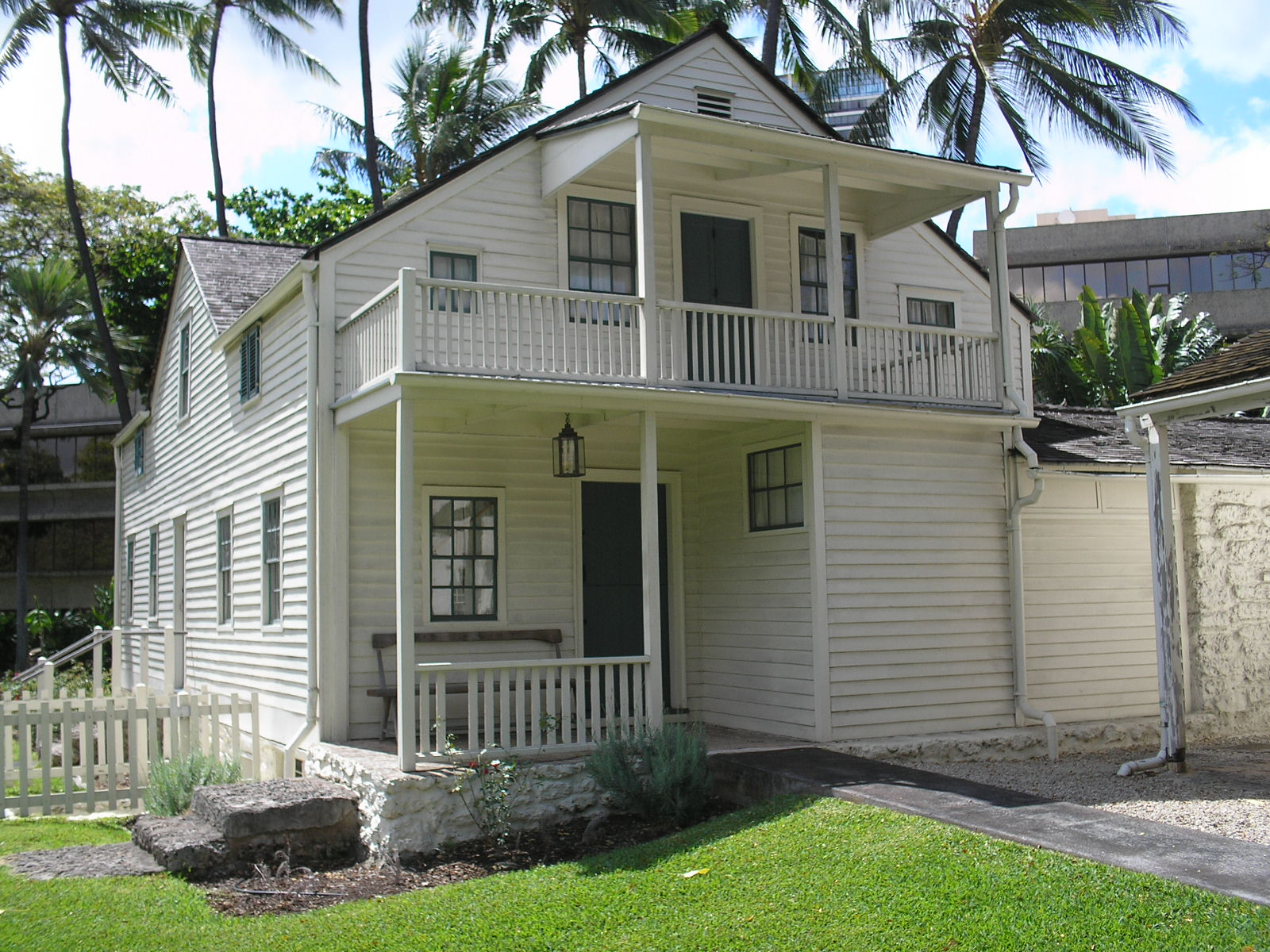
The Oldest Frame House (Ka Hale Lāʻau 'the wood house'), 1821

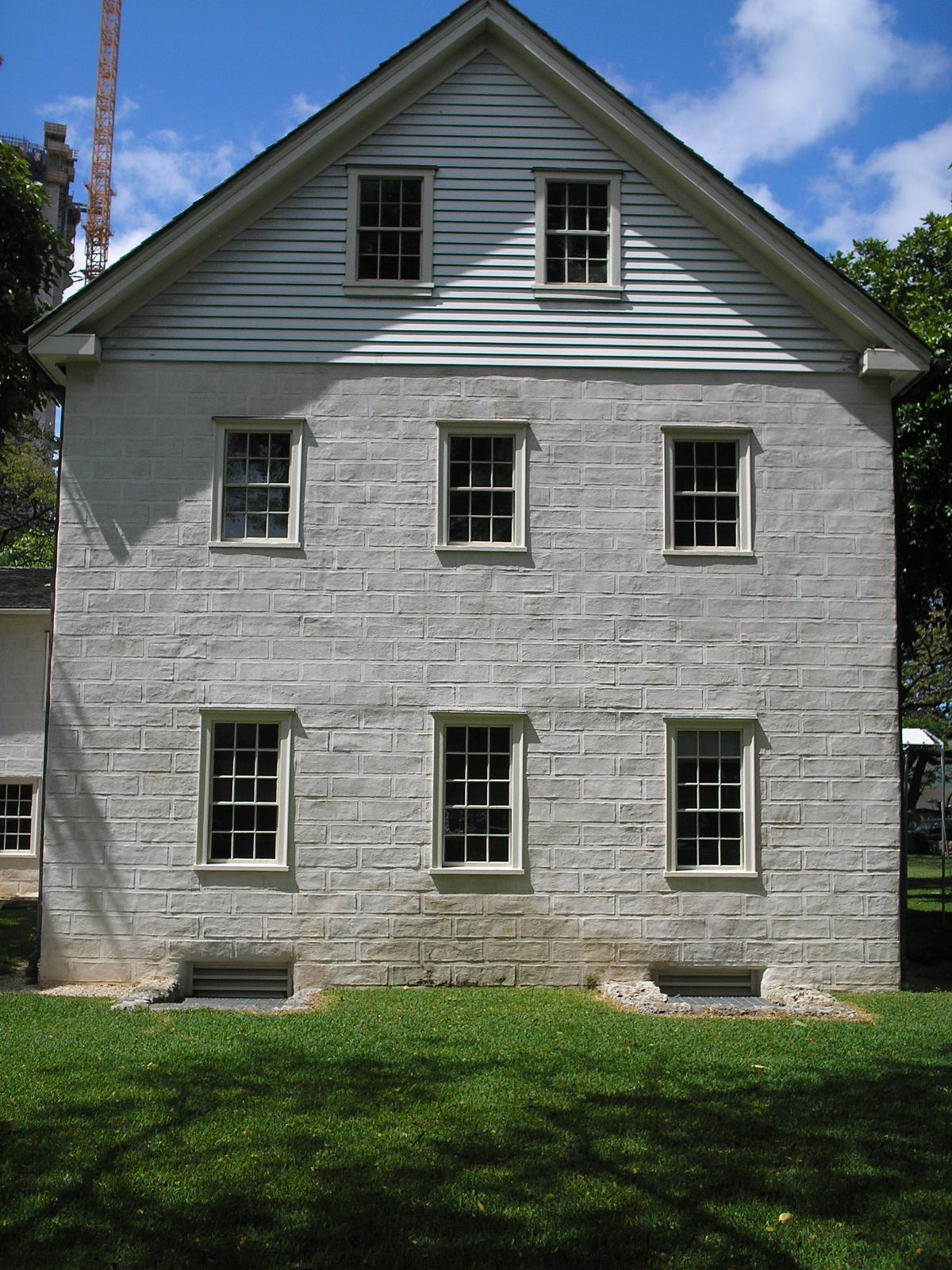
The Chamberlain House (Ka Hale Kamalani), 1831

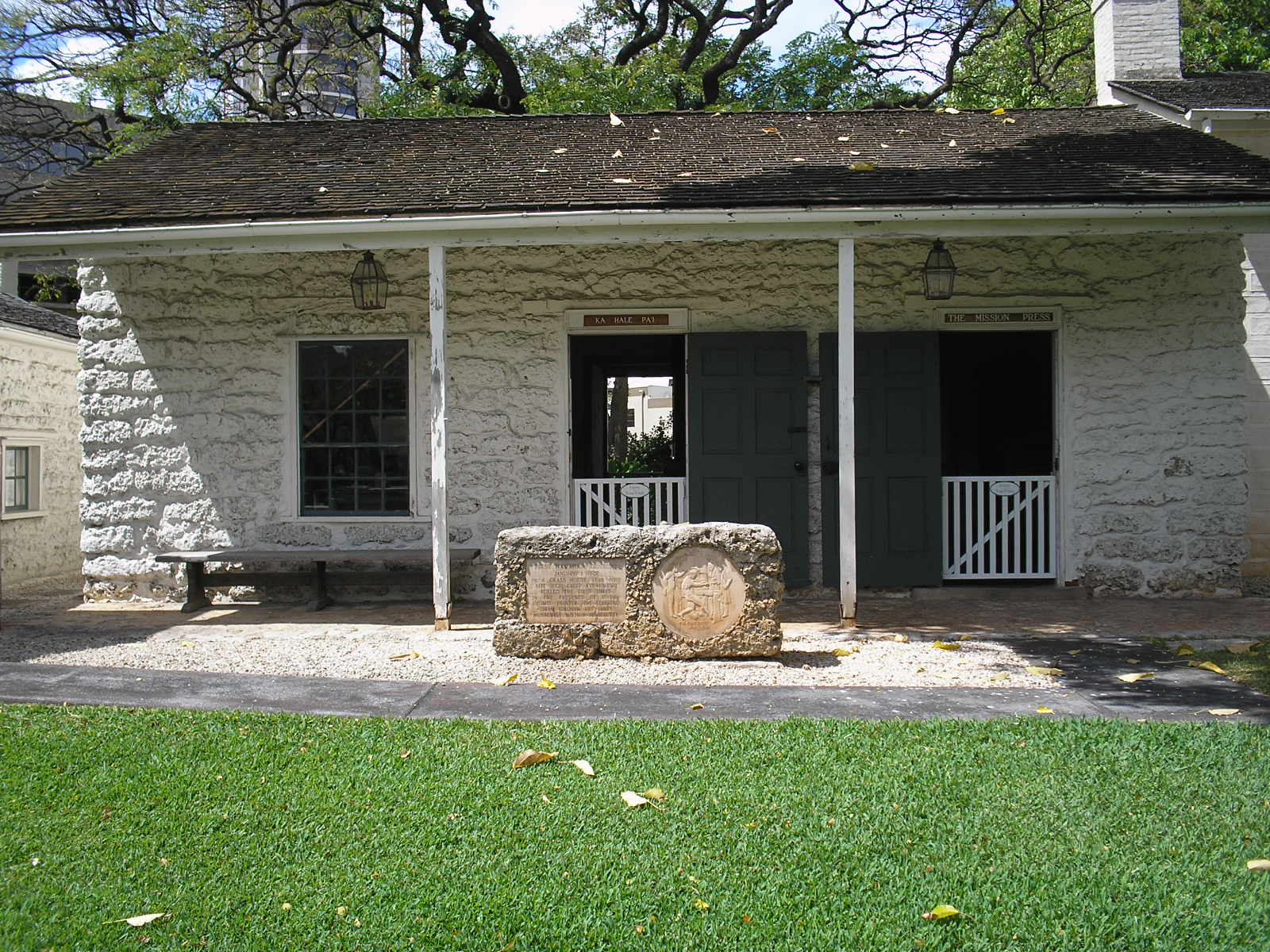
The Print House (Ka Hale Paʻi), 1841

== See also ==
- List of the oldest buildings in Hawaii

== Bibliography ==
- Sandler, Rob, Julie Mehta, and Frank S. Haines (2008), Architecture in Hawai'i: A Chronological Survey, new edition. Honolulu: Mutual Publishing.
- Simpson, MacKinnon (1998), Museum Homes of Honolulu: A Guidebook, Honolulu: Mission Houses Museum.
