= Albert Sturges =

Albert A. Sturges
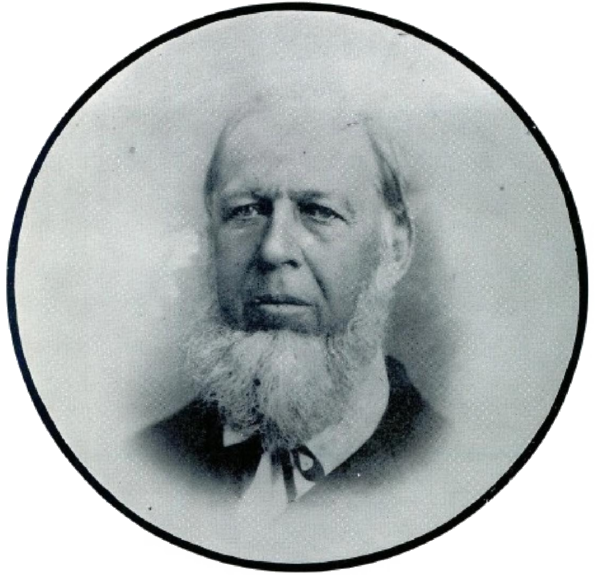
- Born: 1819; Granville, Ohio
- Died: 1887 (aged 67–68); Oakland, California
- Education: Wabash College; Yale Divinity School
- Spouse: Susan Sturges

Albert A. Sturges (1819–1887) was an American Protestant missionary and minister. He was among the first group of American missionaries stationed in Micronesia and helped set up the Congregational church on Pohnpei.

== Biography ==
Albert Sturges was born in Granville, Ohio in 1819. Sturges graduated from Wabash College and Yale Divinity School. He married Susan Thompson in 1851 and was ordained in 1852. He traveled to Micronesia with his wife and served in Ohwa, Pohnpei where he learned the local language and translated some church materials. He helped control a smallpox outbreak in 1854. He lost a daughter named Ella in 1861. Sturges had baptized 154 people by 1864.

As Albert suffered from illness, Albert and his wife returned to the United States in 1869. Albert returned to Pohnpei in 1871, extending the mission to Mokil and Pingelap, and his wife joined him there in 1874. They continued expanding the mission to include the Nomoi Islands in 1874 and Chuuk in 1879. The Sturgeses left Pohnpei again in 1879 to visit the States. Albert returned to Pohnpei in 1881 though his wife stayed behind. Sturges retired from missionary work in 1885 after suffering from a stroke. He died in 1887 at Oakland, California.
