= Likelike =

Princess of the Hawaiian Islands (1851–1887)

- Princess of the Hawaiian Islands
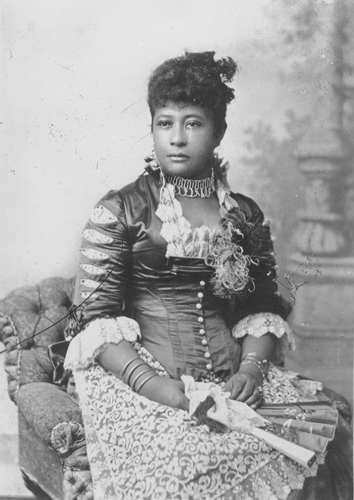
- Likelike in 1885; photograph by James J. Williams

Governor of the Island of Hawaii
- Tenure: March 29, 1879 – September 2, 1880
- Predecessor: Samuel Kipi
- Successor: Victoria Kinoiki Kekaulike
- Born: January 13, 1851; Honolulu, Oʻahu, Hawaiian Kingdom
- Died: February 2, 1887 (aged 36) ʻĀinahau, Honolulu, Oʻahu, Hawaiian Kingdom
- Burial: February 27, 1887; Mauna ʻAla Royal Mausoleum
- Spouse: Archibald Scott Cleghorn
- Issue: Kaʻiulani
Names
- Miriam Likelike Kekāuluohi Keahelapalapa Kapili
- House: Kalākaua
- Father: Caesar Kapaʻakea
- Mother: Analea Keohokālole
- Religion: Church of Hawaii

Likelike (Hawaiian pronunciation: [ˈlikeˈlike]; Miriam Likelike Kekāuluohi Keahelapalapa Kapili; January 13, 1851 – February 2, 1887) was a princess of the Hawaiian Kingdom and member of the reigning House of Kalākaua. She was born in Honolulu, on the island of Oʻahu. Likelike's parents were Analea Keohokālole and Caesar Kapaʻakea, and the family were members of the aliʻi class of the Hawaiian nobility. Before the age of six, she was raised on the island of Hawaii for her health. Likelike later returned to Honolulu, where she was educated by Roman Catholic and Congregationalist teachers in the city's girls' schools.

She married Scottish businessman Archibald Scott Cleghorn in 1870 and was the mother of Princess Kaʻiulani, the last heir to the throne before the 1893 overthrow of the Hawaiian Kingdom. Likelike was the first mistress of the ʻĀinahau estate, which became associated with her daughter. She was Governor of the island of Hawaii from 1879 to 1880 and was in the line of succession to the throne after her sister, Liliʻuokalani. Likelike died under mysterious circumstances in 1887, with rumors that she was malevolently "prayed" to death. She and her siblings are recognized by the Hawaiian Music Hall of Fame as Na Lani ʻEhā (The Heavenly Four) for their patronage and enrichment of Hawaii's musical culture and history.

== Early life and family ==
Likelike was born on January 13, 1851, in Honolulu on the island of Oʻahu, to Analea Keohokālole and Caesar Kapaʻakea. Her full name was Miriam Likelike Kekāuluohi Keahelapalapa Kapili. Two of her namesakes were Likelike (an earlier Hawaiian chiefess and wife of Kalanimoku) and Miriam Auhea Kekāuluohi, Kuhina Nui (premier) and the mother of King Lunalilo (r. 1873–74).

Her parents were political advisors to King Kamehameha III (r. 1825–54) and later to his successor, Kamehameha IV (r. 1855–64). Likelike's mother was the daughter of ʻAikanaka and Kamaʻeokalani, and her father was the son of Kamanawa II (half-brother of ʻAikanaka) and Kamokuiki. Their family belonged to the aliʻi class of Hawaiian nobility and were collateral relatives of the reigning House of Kamehameha, descended from the 18th-century aliʻi nui (supreme monarch) Keaweʻīkekahialiʻiokamoku. Likelike was descended from Keaweaheulu and Kameʻeiamoku, two of the five royal counselors of Kamehameha I (r. 1782–1819) during his conquest of the Hawaiian Kingdom. Kameʻeiamoku, her parents' grandfather, was depicted with his royal twin Kamanawa on the Hawaiian coat of arms.

The youngest daughter and penultimate child of a large family, her biological siblings included James Kaliokalani, David Kalākaua, Liliʻuokalani, Anna Kaʻiulani, Kaʻiminaʻauao, and William Pitt Leleiohoku II. They were hānai (adopted) by other family members. The Hawaiian custom of hānai is an informal form of adoption in extended families. Because Likelike was not healthy as a child, she was sent to live in the dry climate of Kona on the island of Hawaii. The 1892 obituary of Hawaii Supreme Court Justice Lawrence McCully noted that he was her teacher while he resided in Kona. According to historian George Kanahele, she was raised in Hilo on the wetter windward side of the island of Hawaii: "Little is known about her early years".

The identities of Likelike's hānai parents are unknown. According to historian Sammy Amalu, Likelike was brought up in the household of Peleuli (daughter of High Chief Kalaʻimamahu, half-brother of Kamehameha I) with Peleuli's granddaughter Miriam Auhea Kekāuluohi Crowningburg, a second cousin of King Lunalilo. According to newspaper columnist Clarice B. Taylor, Likelike was raised by her mother and then cared for by Queen Emma after her death.

== Education ==
Likelike, c. 1868; photograph by Menzies Dickson

At age six (c. 1857), Likelike returned permanently to Honolulu. She was initially educated at the Sacred Hearts Convent and School by the Roman Catholic sisters of the Congregation of the Sacred Hearts of Jesus and Mary. The sisters arrived in Hawaii in 1859, and established day and boarding schools for Hawaiian girls next to the Cathedral Basilica of Our Lady of Peace in Honolulu. The schools were the predecessor of the Sacred Hearts Academy in Kaimuki. Likelike was later educated by American Congregationalist missionary teacher Maria Ogden at the Makiki Family School, established in Honolulu in 1860 with the support of King Kamehameha IV and Queen Emma. Her last school was the Kawaiahaʻo Seminary for Girls; Likelike's teacher was Lydia Bingham, daughter of Hiram Bingham I (leader of the first group of American Protestant missionaries to introduce Christianity to the Hawaiian Islands). Her classmates at Kawaiahaʻo included Annie Palekaluhi Kaikioʻewa (sister of Edward Kamakau Lilikalani) and Lily Auld, also members of the Hawaiian nobility.

Likelike was particularly close to her elder sister, Liliʻuokalani, who was warm towards (and protective of) her younger sister. In a September 7, 1865, letter, Liliʻuokalani (who had married John Owen Dominis) advised Likelike about her education:

How lonely I feel without you. I miss you wherever I am — in the house — out of doors—in my rides — in my walks. I miss you very much — but I hope that when you have learnt all that is to be learnt at school ... I may be able to have you with me again ... therefore apply yourself my dear Sister to your studies. Try very hard ... This is another thing. Study to control your feelings — strive to be humble to your Superiors — obedient and humble to the Sisters, kind and affectionate to your schoolmates, if any harsh word begins to rise to your lips suppress it — do not let it escape — and when you succeed in doing so you will afterwards be happy to think that you had controled [sic] yourself.

== Betrothal to Albert Kūnuiākea ==
Likelike was betrothed around 1869 to Albert Kūnuiākea, an illegitimate son of King Kamehameha III and the hānai son of Queen Dowager Kalama. Contemporary sources noted, "Their betrothal [was] much desired by those in authority as well as the other chiefs". During the 1869 visit of Alfred, Duke of Edinburgh and the Galatea, Likelike's sister Liliʻuokalani entertained the British prince with a traditional Hawaiian lūʻau at her Waikiki residence of Hamohamo. Likelike accompanied Queen Dowager Kalama and Kūnuiākea on a carriage of state from Honolulu to Waikiki on the occasion of the festivities. The couple broke off the engagement soon afterwards, for unspecified reasons. Kūnuiākea married Mary Lonokahikini, widow of the Reverend Z. Poli, in 1878.

== Marriage to Archibald Scott Cleghorn ==
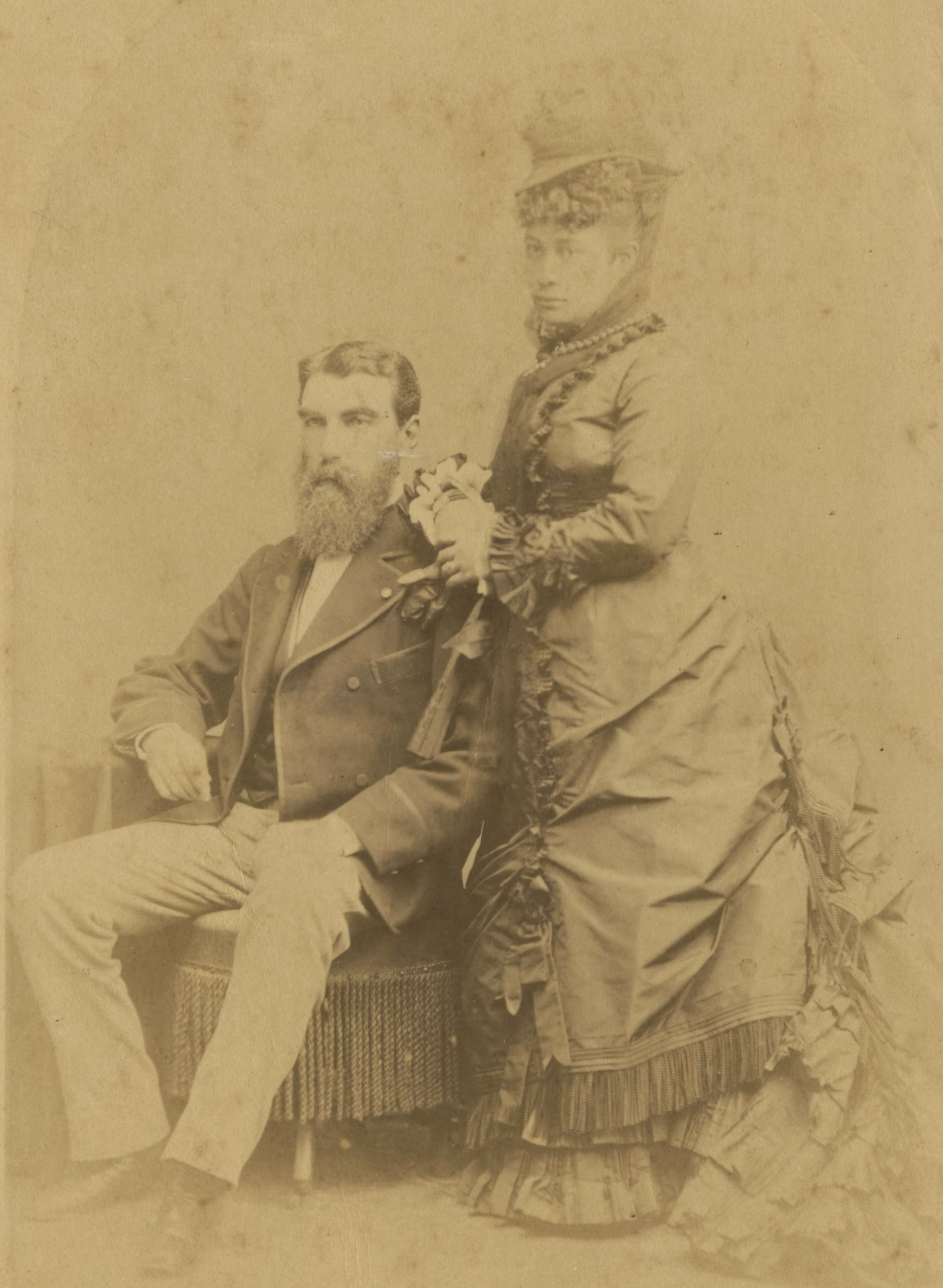
Likelike and her husband, Archibald Scott Cleghorn, during the 1870s

Likelike married Archibald Scott Cleghorn, a businessman from Scotland almost twice her age, on September 22, 1870; Cleghorn was 35, and Likelike was 19. They were married in an Anglican ceremony officiated by Reverend Charles George Williamson, rector of St. Andrew's Cathedral. The wedding was at Washington Place, her sister Liliʻuokalani's residence. Cleghorn had fathered daughters Rose, Helen and Annie with his part-Hawaiian mistress (Elizabeth Lapeka Pauahi Grimes) before the marriage, and Likelike accepted the children.

The couple initially lived in a mansion on Emma Street, the present-day site of The Pacific Club, in Honolulu. Likelike gave birth to their daughter, Kaʻiulani, on October 16, 1875. Liliʻuokalani wrote that Kaʻiulani "was at once recognized as the hope of the Hawaiian people, as the only direct heir by birth to the throne." The long-awaited future heir to the throne was christened by Bishop Alfred Willis at the pro-cathedral of St. Andrew's on December 25, 1875. Princess Ruth Keʻelikōlani and the king and queen were her godparents. Keʻelikōlani gave 10 acres (4.0 ha) of her land in Waikīkī (outside Honolulu) to her goddaughter. The family sold their Honolulu property in 1878 and moved to the beachfront district of Waikīkī, where Cleghorn built a family estate which Likelike named ʻĀinahau (cool land).

Kaʻiulani was the couple's only child. Likelike had a miscarriage in June 1877 on a ship en route to San Francisco, California, and may have had another miscarriage after a fall from a horse before her final illness.

Like her sister Lydia's marriage to John Owen Dominis, her marriage to Cleghorn was bittersweet. Victorian gentlemen expected to be the lord of their castle, their servants, their children, and their wives. Hawaiian nobility (aliʻi), however, were raised to rule others. Cleghorn could be blustery and demanding; on several occasions, the princess returned to the island of Hawaii and refused to return until they reconciled.

Likelike was vivacious and well-liked, and her home was open to important people from all over the world. She had a reputation as a gracious hostess at her ʻĀinahau estate. Likelike was au courant with the latest fashions, ordering dresses and clothing from San Francisco and Paris. She was known to be imperious and quick-tempered, once striking a groom with a whip for not keeping the carriage properly polished. Likelike was baptized and confirmed in the Anglican Church of Hawaii in 1882.

== Public life ==
After his accession, Likelike's brother Kalākaua bestowed royal titles and ranks upon her and their siblings: sisters became Princess Lydia Kamakaʻeha Dominis (Liliʻuokalani) and Princess Miriam Likelike Cleghorn and their brother became Prince William Pitt Leleiohoku. The latter was also named heir to the Hawaiian throne, as Kalākaua and Queen Kapiʻolani had no children of their own.

After Leleiohoku's death on April 9, 1877, Kalākaua proclaimed Liliʻuokalani heir apparent to the throne. Likelike and her daughter were next in the line of succession. Kalākaua bestowed the title of Princess of the Kingdom on Likelike by letters patent on February 10, 1883, also recognizing other members of his family who been using their courtesy titles since 1873. She was ranked in precedence behind the king and queen, Queen Dowager Emma and Liliʻuokalani and her husband, John Owen Dominis, and ranked above her husband and their daughter Princess Kaʻiulani. Likelike participated in Kalākaua's coronation, nine years into his reign, on February 12, 1883. She wore "a robe of brocaded white satin trimmed with pearls and feathers" ordered from San Francisco, and was waited on by sisters Clara and Lizzie Coney.

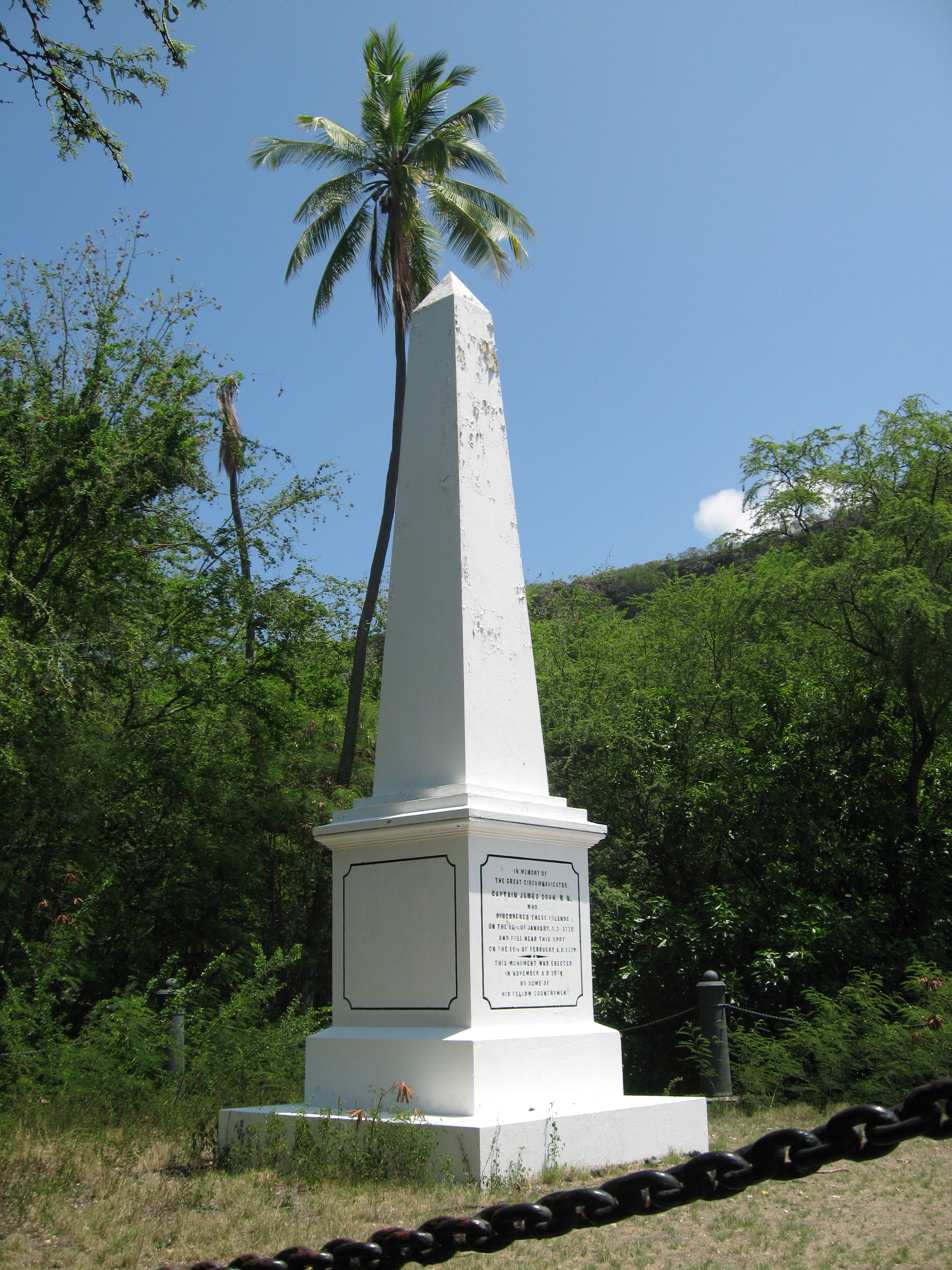
The Cook Monument at Kealakekua Bay

The Cook Monument, an obelisk commemorating Captain James Cook's landing on the Hawaiian Islands, was unveiled in November 1874 at the place where he was killed. Great Britain and the United States were seen at the time seen as allies who prevented Russia from seizing the kingdom. On January 26, 1877, Likelike and Cleghorn deeded their land at the Cook Monument at Kealakekua Bay in trust to the British Commissioner to Hawaii James Hay Wodehouse and his subsequent heirs for one dollar "to keep and maintain" the monument. Although the deed names Likelike and her husband, its only signatory was Cleghorn's. Because of the deed's wording, Wodehouse and his heirs (not the British government) became owners of the land. The error was not discovered until 1939, when the Wodehouse estate conveyed the deed to the British government for $1.

=== Governorship ===
Governor Samuel Kipi died in office on March 11, 1879. Likelike was appointed his successor on March 29, and held the position until September 2, 1880. Her first official meeting as governor was at the Hilo courthouse on May 31. The island of Hawaii was no stranger to a female governor, since Princess Keʻelikōlani (Kaʻiulani's godmother) had held the position from 1855 to 1874. During her tenure, Likelike visited all of the island's districts and had a special affinity for Kona and Hilo.

In April 1880, the legislature of the Kingdom appropriated an annual allowance of $8,000 (a $5,000 increase from her salary as governor) for Likelike "provided she resigns the office of Governess of Hawaii". She had resigned her position by September 1880, and Princess Victoria Kinoiki Kekaulike (Queen Kapiʻolani's younger sister) was appointed her successor on September 2 of that year. The 1882 legislative session increased her annual salary to $12,000 and appropriate $5,000 for her seven year-old daughter Princess Kaʻiulani.

=== Philanthropy ===
Likelike was involved in a number of philanthropic projects. On February 19, 1874, she created and organized the Hui Hooulu a Hoola La Hui of Kalakaua I, a charity of which she was its first president. Organized one week after her brother's ascension to the throne, it took its name from his motto ("Hoʻoulu Lāhui"; "to increase, restore, re-establish and advance the lāhui [people]"). The organization provided assistance for the needy, including financial help, clothing, medical care or shelter, food, and family burials. Likelike helped her sister to found the Liliʻuokalani Educational Society, an organization "to interest the Hawaiian ladies in the proper training of young girls of their own race whose parents would be unable to give them advantages by which they would be prepared for the duties of life", in 1886. She led one division of the organization, and Liliʻuokalani led the other. It supported the education of Hawaiian girls at Likelike's alma mater, Kawaiahaʻo Seminary for Girls, and Kamehameha School. After Likelike's death, Liliʻuokalani assumed full leadership of the organization.

== Travels to Australia and the United States ==
Likelike traveled abroad three times during her marriage. She visited Auckland, Sydney and Melbourne from August to December 1871 with her husband on their extended honeymoon, and met colonial governors and officials. In 1877, mourning the death of her brother Leleiohoku, she traveled to San Francisco for her health and returned to Honolulu on the steamer Likelike on its first voyage between California and Hawaii. Likelike revisited San Francisco in 1884 with Hawaiian banker Charles Reed Bishop and Liliʻuokalani's hānai sister, Bernice Pauahi Bishop; Bernice was going to the city to undergo surgery for breast cancer, of which she later died. Their visit coincided with the arrival of Queen Marau, wife of King Pōmare V of Tahiti, who was en route to Paris. Before her death, Likelike was planning to travel to Monterey with Kaʻiulani for their health.

== Death and state funeral ==
She had been in failing health for months, but her doctors only advised fresh air and a change of scenery. Likelike became weaker, and was advised to get "more nourishment". In mid-January 1887, a large school of red āweoweo fish was seen off the coast of the island of Hawaii, an omen in native Hawaiian beliefs that foretold the death of a member of royalty. At 5:15 p.m. on February 2, 1887, Likelike died of unknown causes at age 36.

Rumors circulated in Hawaii's Euro-American (haole) community that she had died of fear due to superstition or had been "prayed" to death by a powerful kahuna ʻanāʻanā, (Note: "Anā.ʻanā", in this context, refers to "black magic, evil sorcery by means of prayer and incantation".) or that she sacrificed her life to the goddess Pele to stop the 1887 eruption of Mauna Loa. According to her medical advisors however, they stated that "If Princess Likelike had taken sufficient nourishment there was no reason why she should not have recovered strength."

According to Hawaiian legend, Likelike asked to see Kaʻiulani on her deathbed, and during her last moments, she prophesied that Kaʻiulani would leave Hawaii for a long time, never marry and never become queen. Kaʻiulani was educated in England from 1889 to 1897. She was declared heir apparent to the Hawaiian throne during the reign of her aunt, Queen Liliʻuokalani (r. 1891–1893). After the 1893 overthrow of the Hawaiian Kingdom, Kaʻiulani traveled from London to Washington, D.C. and convinced U.S. President Grover Cleveland to attempt to restore the monarchy. Cleveland sent Commissioner James Henderson Blount to investigate the overthrow and try, unsuccessfully, to restore the queen. Kaʻiulani returned to Hawaii in 1897, and saw the annexation of the Hawaiian Islands by the United States on August 12, 1898. She died of rheumatism at ʻĀinahau on March 6, 1899.

=== Funeral and burial ===
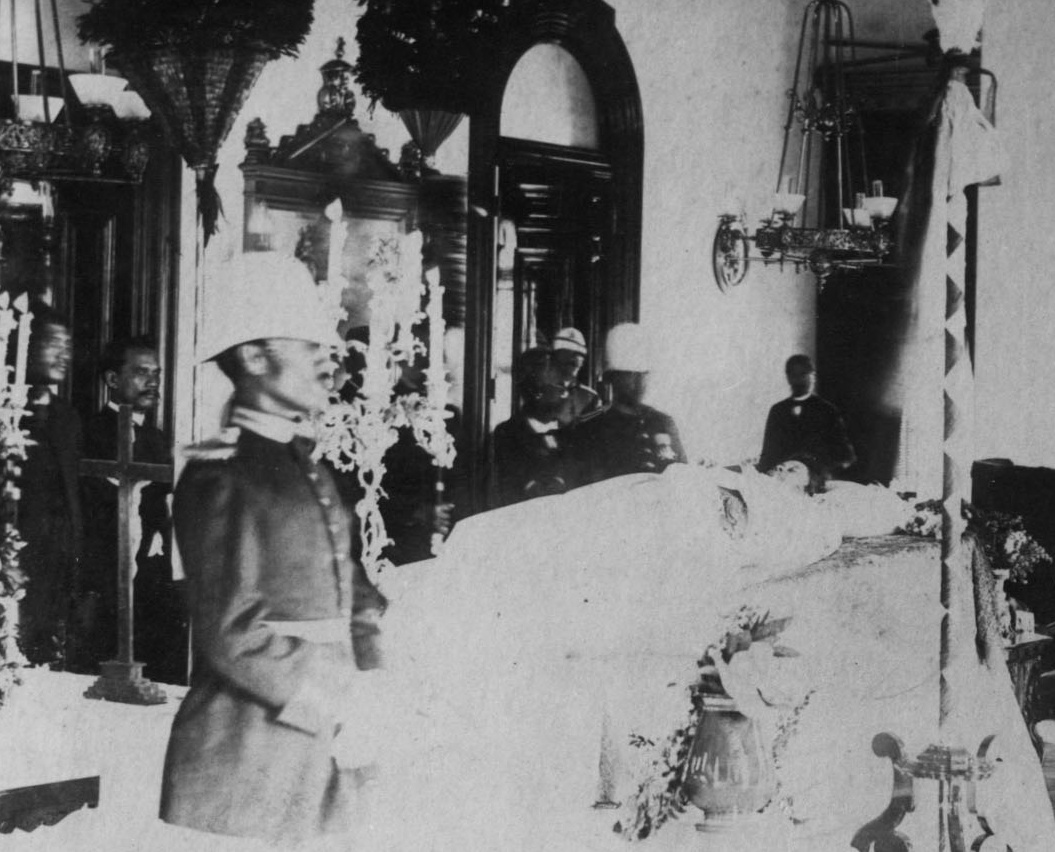
Likelike lying in state at ʻIolani Palace

Native Hawaiian protocol dictated that the body of an aliʻi could only be moved after midnight following death, and had to be interred on the sabbath. In accordance with those beliefs, Likelike's body was moved sometime after midnight on February 3 and arrived at ʻIolani Palace around 2 a.m. She was placed on a catafalque in the throne room, where she lay in state until the following afternoon. The princess was covered by a satin shroud, with kāhili wavers on both sides. A private viewing was provided for the royal family and government dignitaries before a public viewing, and government offices were closed. Likelike's funeral was weeks later, after her body was embalmed and details of the procession were finalized.

The funeral was held in the throne room on Sunday, February 27. The kāhili bearers had waved continuously since February 3, and "no hula had marred the solemnity". Bishop Willis and Rev. Alexander Macintosh conducted daily services during the 24-day period. A large funeral procession followed, whose participants were mostly native Hawaiian. Likelike was buried in the Royal Mausoleum at Mauna ʻAla. Her coffin was placed at the head of the main mausoleum, in the center of a row of other coffins. Photographers and a sketch artist recorded the event.

Likelike's funeral cost $30,337.54 in Hawaiian dollars (equivalent to $1,087,095 in 2025), prompting an investigation. The legislative finance committee studied past funeral expenses for Hawaiian royals, and concluded that the costs "are unprecedented in the history of state funerals in this country" and "[t]here was utter recklessness, lawlessness and lack of proper authorization in the expenditures incurred". About $22,000 of the total cost was for clothing the over 1,600 mourners. The committee recommended that the legislature approve a payment of $10,772.71, with the remainder to be paid by the trustees of the king's estate. The previous state funeral, for Queen Dowager Emma in 1885, cost $5,965.98; four years later, the state funeral of Kalākaua had greater financial oversight and cost $21,442.

In a June 24, 1910, ceremony officiated by Likelike's sister, Queen Liliʻuokalani, the remains of the deceased members of the Kalākaua dynasty were transferred to the underground Kalākaua Crypt after the main mausoleum was converted into a chapel. The niche bearing her remains, inscribed "H.R.H. Like Like | Born 1835–Died 1887", is next to the niches for her daughter Kaʻiulani and Cleghorn (who died shortly after the crypt was completed).

== Musical compositions ==
Likelike was taught music from childhood and learned to play piano, guitar and ukulele. An early part of the entourage of her sister, Liliʻuokalani, music defined their social life in the royal circle. In 1877, Liliʻuokalani composed Aloha ʻOe about the parting of two lovers in Maunawili; later historians have speculated that the song was about Likelike and an unknown man. Sanoe (another royal composition by Likelike's lady-in-waiting, Elizabeth Keawepoʻoʻole Sumner, and Liliʻuokalani) alludes to a secret love affair between an unknown man and a married woman at the royal court.

The two sisters founded a royal choral group, Hui Himeni Kaohuokalani (the Kaohuokalani Singing Club or Kaohuokalani Singing Association), early in their brother's reign. They participated in choral competitions with groups founded by their brothers. The group composed a number of kanikau (dirges) for the funeral of Princess Likelike in 1887, including songs by Liliʻuokalani and ladies-in-waiting Kapoli Kamakau and Eliza Wood Holt. Kamakau composed "Imi Ia Ka Lani" ("The Heavenly One Is Sought") as a tribute to Likelike at her death.

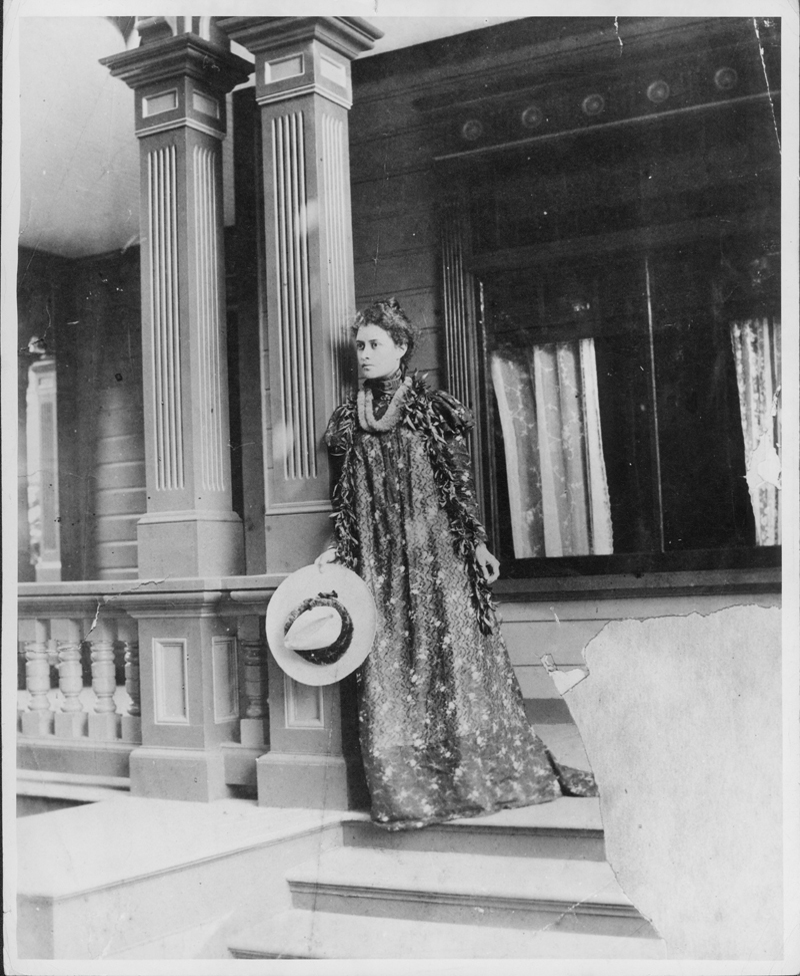
Likelike's daughter, Kaʻiulani, at ʻÂinahau c. 1898

Few of Likelike's compositions survive, compared to those of her siblings. She signed many of her mele (songs) with the name "Kapili". Notable surviving compositions include "ʻÂinahau" (an ode to her home, where she composed most of her works) and "Kuʻu Ipo Ika Heʻe Pue One" ("My Sweetheart"), also known as "Ka ʻOwē A Ke Kai", which Kanahele said was "written for a sweetheart she never married". Other songs included "Maikaʻi Waipiʻo" ("Beautiful Waipiʻo", her daughter's favorite), "ʻAia Hiki Mai" and "Lei Ohaoha".

Likelike and her siblings are recognized by the Hawaiian Music Hall of Fame as Na Lani ʻEhā (The Heavenly Four) for their patronage and enrichment of Hawaii's musical culture and history. According to Kanahele, Likelike is the least recognized of the four royals:

Princess Likelike is perhaps the least recognized of the Royal Composers. This state of affairs is due probably as much to her tertiary status in the royal hierarchy of succession as to her musical talents and accomplishments. Nonetheless, her compositions, though perhaps fewer in number those of her brothers and sister, still claim a wide audience today.

== Memorials and namesakes ==
Likelike Street, near the original ʻIolani Palace, was named in honor of the princess in 1874. After the construction of the second palace on the same spot, Likelike Gate (which faced Likelike Street) was named in her honor and used as a private entrance for members of the royal family.

The Hawaiian postal service issued one-cent, blue-on-green postage stamps with a portrait of Likelike in 1882. They were in use until 1894.

The steamship Likelike, named for the princess, was launched on August 2, 1877, from San Francisco and arrived in Honolulu on August 14. Sold to businessman Samuel Gardner Wilder and used for inter-island transport, it was wrecked in 1897 off the coast of Keawe‘ula on the island of Hawaii.

A window at St. Andrew's Cathedral in Honolulu was dedicated to Likelike by her daughter, Kaʻiulani. Several places in Hawaii are named after the princess, including Likelike Highway and Likelike Elementary School.

== Ancestry ==
Kalākaua family tree

Key- (k)= Kane (male/husband)
(w)= wahine (female/wife)
Subjects with bold titles, lavender highlighted, bold box= Direct bloodline
Bold title, bold, grey box= Aunts, uncles, cousins line
Bold title, bold white box= European or American (raised to aliʻi status by marriage or monarch's decree)
Regular name and box= makaʻāinana or untitled foreign subject

Kāneikaiwilani (k)
Lonoikahaupu (k)
Keawepoepoe (k)
Kameʻeiamoku (k)
Kepoʻokalani (k)
Kamanawa II (k)
Kapaʻakea (1815–1866)
Kaliokalani (1835–1852)

Kanalohanaui (k)	Keākealani (w)	Ahu-a-ʻI (k)	Piʻilani (w) II	Moana (k)
Kalanikauleleiaiwi (w)	Kauauaʻamahi (k)	Keawe II (k)	Lonomaʻaikanaka (w)	Kauhiahaki (k)	ʻIliki-ā-Moana (w)
Kanoena (w)	Haʻaeamahi (k)	Kekelakekeokalani (w)	Alapaʻi Nui (k)	Keaka (w)	Keeaumoku Nui (k)	Kamakaimoku (w)	Kaeamamao (k) (Note: Genealogy of Liliuokalani, page 400, appendix B, No. 2 Queen of Hawaii, Liliuokalani (1898). Hawaii's Story by Hawaii's Queen. University of Hawaii Press. p. 400. "Kapaakea genealogy.")	Kaolanialiʻi (w)
Kamakaʻeheikuli (w)	Keōua (k)	Kahekili II (k)	Kekuiapoiwa II (w)	Ikuaʻana (w)	Heulu (k)	Moana (w)	Keaweʻopala (k)	Nohomualani (k)
Keaweaheulu (k)	Ululani (w)	Hakau (w)	Kanaʻina (k)	Kauwa (w)	Eia (k)
Alapai (w)	Keohohiwa (w)	Keōpūolani (w)	Kamehameha I	Kalaniʻōpuʻu (k)	Kānekapōlei (w)	Kiʻilaweau (k)	Nāhiʻōleʻa (k)	Kahoʻowaha II (w)	Inaina (w)
Hao (K)	Kailipakalua (w)
Kamokuiki (w)	ʻAikanaka (k)	Kamaeokalani (w)	Kaōleiokū (k)	Keoua (w)	Luahine (w)	Kalaʻimamahu	Kaheiheimālie
Kamehameha II	Kamehameha III	Kekūanaōʻa (k)	Kahalaiʻa; Luanuʻu (k)	Pauahi (w)	Kīnaʻu (w)	Pākī (k)	Kōnia (w)	Kanaʻina II	Kaʻahumanu III
Keohokālole (1816–1869)	Keʻelikōlani (w)	Kamehameha IV	Kamehameha V	Kaʻahumanu IV	Pauahi Bishop (w)	Bishop (k)	Lunalilo (k)
Kalākaua (1836–1891)	Kapiʻolani (1834–1899)	Liliʻuokalani (1838–1917)	Dominis (1832–1891)	Kaʻiulani (1842–?)	Kaʻiminaʻauao (1845–1848)	Cleghorn (1835–1910)	Likelike (1851–1887)	Leleiohoku II (1854–1877)
Kaʻiulani (1875–1899)

== Bibliography ==
=== Books and journals ===
- Allen, Helena G. (1982). The Betrayal of Liliuokalani: Last Queen of Hawaii, 1838–1917. Glendale, CA: Arthur H. Clark Company. ISBN 978-0-87062-144-4. OCLC 9576325.
- Bonura, Sandra; Witmer, Sally (2013). "Lydia K. Aholo — Her Story Recovering the Lost Voice". The Hawaiian Journal of History. 47. Honolulu: Hawaiian Historical Society: 103–145. hdl:10524/36266. OCLC 60626541.
- Clark, John R. K. (2002). Hawaii Place Names: Shores, Beaches, and Surf Sites. University of Hawai'i Press. ISBN 978-0-8248-6278-7.
- Cleghorn, Thomas A. K.; Cleghorn, Nellie Yarnell Maxwell; Argow, Dorothy; Allen, Katherine B. (1979). "Thomas Alexander Kaulaahi Cleghorn". The Watumull Foundation, Oral History Project. Honolulu: 1–82. hdl:10524/48595. OCLC 10006035.
- Cook, Kealani (2018). Return to Kahiki: Native Hawaiians in Oceania. Cambridge: Cambridge University Press. ISBN 978-1-108-16914-1. OCLC 1126637571.
- Cooke, Amos Francis (1913). "The Story of Hawaiian Stamps (Continued)". The Mid-Pacific Magazine. Honolulu: T. H., A. H. Ford; Pan-Pacific Union, Pan-Pacific Research Institution. pp. 451–456. OCLC 45158315.
- Coulter, John Wesley (June 1964). "Great Britain in Hawaii: The Captain Cook Monument". The Geographical Journal. 130 (2). London: The Royal Geographical Society: 256–261. Bibcode:1964GeogJ.130..256C. doi:10.2307/1794586. JSTOR 1794586.
- Forbes, David W., ed. (2003). Hawaiian National Bibliography, 1780–1900, Volume 4: 1881–1900. Vol. 4. Honolulu: University of Hawaii Press. ISBN 978-0-8248-2636-9. OCLC 123279964.
- Gregg, David L. (1982). King, Pauline (ed.). The Diaries of David Lawrence Gregg: An American Diplomat in Hawaii, 1853–1858. Honolulu: Hawaiian Historical Society. ISBN 9780824808617. OCLC 8773139.
- Haley, James L. (2014). Captive Paradise: A History of Hawaii. New York: St. Martin's Press. ISBN 978-0-312-60065-5. OCLC 865158092.
- Hodges, Wm C. (William C. ) (1918). The passing of Liliuokalani : preceded by A brief historical interpretation of the life of Liliuokalani of Hawaii. Honolulu : Honolulu Star Bulletin.
- Kaeo, Peter; Queen Emma (1976). Korn, Alfons L. (ed.). News from Molokai, Letters Between Peter Kaeo & Queen Emma, 1873–1876. Honolulu: The University Press of Hawaii. hdl:10125/39980. ISBN 978-0-8248-0399-5. OCLC 2225064.
- Dailybulletin (1888). Constitution & by-laws of the Ahahui hooulu a hoola society. Daily bulletin steam printing office.
- Kam, Ralph Thomas (2017). Death Rites and Hawaiian Royalty: Funerary Practices in the Kamehameha and Kalakaua Dynasties, 1819–1953. S. I.: McFarland, Incorporated, Publishers. ISBN 978-1-4766-6846-8. OCLC 966566652.
- Kamehiro, Stacy L. (2009). The Arts of Kingship: Hawaiian Art and National Culture of the Kalākaua Era. Honolulu: University of Hawaii Press. ISBN 978-0-8248-3263-6. OCLC 663885792.
- Kanahele, George S. (1999). Emma: Hawaii's Remarkable Queen. Honolulu: University of Hawaii Press. ISBN 978-0-8248-2240-8. OCLC 40890919.
- Kanahele, George S. (1979). Hawaiian Music and Musicians: An Illustrated History. University Press of Hawaii. ISBN 978-0-8248-0578-4. OCLC 903648649.
- Kanahele, George S. (2002) [1986]. Pauahi: The Kamehameha Legacy. Honolulu: Kamehameha Schools Press. ISBN 978-0-87336-005-0. OCLC 173653971. Archived from the original on September 27, 2015.
- Kuykendall, Ralph Simpson (1953). The Hawaiian Kingdom 1854–1874, Twenty Critical Years. Vol. 2. Honolulu: University of Hawaii Press. ISBN 978-0-87022-432-4. OCLC 47010821. Archived from the original on December 13, 2014.
- Kuykendall, Ralph Simpson (1967). The Hawaiian Kingdom 1874–1893, The Kalakaua Dynasty. Vol. 3. Honolulu: University of Hawaii Press. ISBN 978-0-87022-433-1. OCLC 500374815. Archived from the original on January 20, 2015.
- Law, Anwei Skinsnes (2012). Kalaupapa: A Collective Memory. University of Hawai'i Press. ISBN 978-0-8248-6580-1. Archived from the original on October 26, 2016.
- Liliuokalani (1898). Hawaii's Story by Hawaii's Queen, Liliuokalani. Boston: Lee and Shepard. ISBN 978-0-548-22265-2. OCLC 2387226.
- Liliuokalani Education Society (1887). Letters of Condolence and Resolutions on the Death of Princess Likelike, Wife of A.S. Cleghorn.
- Linnea, Sharon (1999). Princess Kaʻiulani: Hope of a Nation, Heart of a People. Grand Rapids, MI: Eerdmans Young Readers. ISBN 978-0-8028-5088-1. OCLC 36727806.
- Lyons, Lorenzo (1945). Makua Laiana: The Story of Lorenzo Lyons, Lovingly Known to Hawaiians as Ka Makua Laiana, Haku Mele O Ka Aina Mauna (Father Lyons, Lyric Poet of the Mountain Country). Honolulu: Privately printed, Honolulu Star-Bulletin. OCLC 5067980.
- Mcdermott, John F.; Choy, Zita Cup; Guerrero, Anthony P. S. (2015). "The Last Illness and Death of Hawaiʻi's King Kalākaua: A New Historical/Clinical Perspective Cover". The Hawaiian Journal of History. 49. Honolulu: Hawaiian Historical Society: 59–72. doi:10.1353/hjh.2015.0002. hdl:10524/56606. OCLC 60626541.
- Newbury, Colin (2001). "Patronage and Bureaucracy in the Hawaiian Kingdom, 1840–1893". Pacific Studies. 24 (1–2). Laie, HI: Brigham Young University, Hawaii Campus: 1–38. ISSN 0275-3596. OCLC 193272210. Archived from the original on April 15, 2012.
- Parker, David "Kawika" (2008). "Crypts of the Ali`i The Last Refuge of the Hawaiian Royalty". Tales of Our Hawaiʻi (PDF). Honolulu: Alu Like, Inc. OCLC 309392477. Archived from the original (PDF) on November 11, 2013.
- Peterson, Barbara Bennett, ed. (1984). Notable Women of Hawaii. Honolulu: University of Hawaii Press. ISBN 978-0-8248-0820-4. OCLC 11030010.
- Pratt, Elizabeth Kekaaniauokalani Kalaninuiohilaukapu (1920). History of Keoua Kalanikupuapa-i-nui: Father of Hawaii Kings, and His Descendants, with Notes on Kamehameha I, First King of All Hawaii. Honolulu: Honolulu Star-Bulletin. OCLC 154181545. Archived from the original on May 3, 2016.
- Restarick, Henry Bond (1924). Hawaii, 1778–1920, from the Viewpoint of a Bishop: Being the Story of English and American Churchmen in Hawaii with Historical Sidelights. Honolulu: Paradise of the Pacific. OCLC 1337282. Archived from the original on July 27, 2018.
- Sebree, Shirley (1994). Pele's tears: reclaiming the lost gems of Hawaiian music in western music styles. New York: Vantage Press. ISBN 978-0-533-10631-8. OCLC 260209675.
- Taylor, Albert Pierce (1922). Under Hawaiian Skies: A Narrative of the Romance, Adventure and History of the Hawaiian Islands. Honolulu: Advertiser Publishing Company, Ltd. OCLC 479709.
- Taylor, Albert Pierce (1927). The Rulers of Hawaii, The Chiefs and Chiefesses, Their Palaces, Monuments, Portraits and Tombs. Honolulu: Advertiser Publishing Company. OCLC 9380797. Archived from the original on January 23, 2017.
- Topolinski, John Renken Kahaʻi (March 1976). "Musical Diggings – The Sumner Family". Haʻilono Mele. II (3). Honolulu: The Hawaiian Music Foundation: 3–8.
- Tranquada, Jim; King, John (2012). The ʻUkulele: A History. Honolulu: University of Hawaii Press. ISBN 978-0-8248-3544-6. OCLC 767806914. Archived from the original on March 5, 2017 – via Project MUSE.
- Waldron, Else (1967). Honolulu 100 Years Ago. Honolulu: Fisher Print Company. OCLC 433915. Archived from the original on July 9, 2020.
- Webb, Nancy; Webb, Jean Francis (1998) [1962]. Kaiulani: Crown Princess of Hawaii. Honolulu: Mutual Publishing. ISBN 978-1-56647-206-7. OCLC 265217757.
- Williams, Julie Stewart (1997). From the Mountains to the Sea: Early Hawaiian Life. Kamehameha Schools Press. ISBN 0-87336-030-3. Archived from the original on June 19, 2015.
- Zambucka, Kristin (1977). The High Chiefess: Ruth Keelikolani. Honolulu: Mana Publishing Company. OCLC 3836213.
- Zambucka, Kristin (1998). Princess Kaiulani Of Hawaii. Honolulu: Mutual Publishing. ISBN 978-1-56647-710-9. OCLC 1057013348. Archived from the original on June 13, 2020.

=== Newspapers and online sources ===
- Apple, Russ; Apple, Peg (September 22, 1970). "This Day In Our Hawaiian Heritage". Honolulu-Star Advertiser. Honolulu. p. 20.
- "At Rest". The Independent. Honolulu. March 11, 1903. p. 2. Archived from the original on March 5, 2016.
- "By Authority". The Hawaiian Gazette. Honolulu. April 2, 1879. p. 2.
- "By Authority". The Pacific Commercial Advertiser. Honolulu. September 4, 1880. p. 3.
- "By Authority". The Pacific Commercial Advertiser. Honolulu. February 17, 1883a. p. 5. Archived from the original on November 8, 2017.
- "A Hawaiian Chief Dies of the Asthma". The Honolulu Advertiser. Honolulu. August 8, 1909. p. 6. Archived from the original on July 26, 2018.
- "In Memoriam, Princess Likelike". The Hawaiian Gazette. Honolulu. February 15, 1887. p. 1. Archived from the original on December 30, 2018.
- Hawe, Jeff (August 7, 2018). "Ahead of Her Time". Hawaii Business Magazine. Honolulu. Archived from the original on January 3, 2019.
- Kapiikauinamoku (November 28, 1955). "Likelike Was Cherished By Kamehameha Dynasty – The Story of Hawaiian Royalty". The Honolulu Advertiser. Honolulu. p. 20.
- Kapiikauinamoku (June 21, 1956). "Peleuli II Brought Up In Kamehamehaʻs Court – The Story of Maui Royalty". The Honolulu Advertiser. Honolulu. p. 18.
- "Likelike, Princess office record". digital archives. State of Hawaii. Archived from the original on July 21, 2011.
- "Married". The Pacific Commercial Advertiser. Honolulu. September 24, 1870. p. 2. Archived from the original on December 17, 2018.
- "Notes of the Week". The Pacific Commercial Advertiser. Honolulu. April 25, 1874. p. 3.
- "Obituary of Kaiulani". The Pacific Commercial Advertiser. Honolulu. March 13, 1899. pp. 1–3.
- "The Oldest Government Officer". The Pacific Commercial Advertiser. Honolulu. April 15, 1892. p. 3. Archived from the original on July 1, 2020.
- The Pacific Commercial Advertiser (1883b). Coronation of the King and Queen of the Hawaiian Islands, at Honolulu, Monday, Feb 12th 1883. Honolulu: Printed at the Advertiser Steam Printing House. OCLC 77955761.
- "The Weird Ceremonial of Monarchial Times Marked Transfer of Kalakaua Dynasty Dead to Tomb". The Hawaiian Gazette. Honolulu. June 28, 1910. p. 2. Archived from the original on October 18, 2014.
- Scott, Marjorie J. (September 8, 1995). "Contributions of royal family recognized". The Honolulu Advertiser. Honolulu. p. 17. Archived from the original on July 30, 2018.
- Taylor, Clarice B. (1954). Holt, Lisa Ululani (ed.). The Fabulous Holts. Honolulu. Archived from the original on December 8, 2016.
- Taylor, Clarice B. (February 3, 1951). "Little Tales All About Hawaii – Kunuiakea Is Raised As a Future Prince – No. 18". Honolulu Star-Bulletin. Honolulu. p. 44.
- Taylor, Clarice B. (June 15, 1951). "Little Tales All About Hawaii – Keohokalole Has A Family of 11 – No. 15". Honolulu Star-Bulletin. Honolulu. p. 26.

Preceded by Samuel Kipi	Governor of Hawaii Island; 1879–1880	Succeeded by Victoria Kinoiki Kekaulike
