= Emma Taylor =

Emma Taylor may refer to:

- Emma Ahuena Taylor (1867–1937), Hawaiian historian and genealogist
- Emma Taylor-Isherwood (born 1987), Canadian actress
- Emma Taylor (engineer), British safety engineer
- Emma Taylor (Coronation Street), fictional character
- Emma Taylor (rugby union) (born 1992), Canadian rugby union player
