= Menzies Dickson =

American photographer

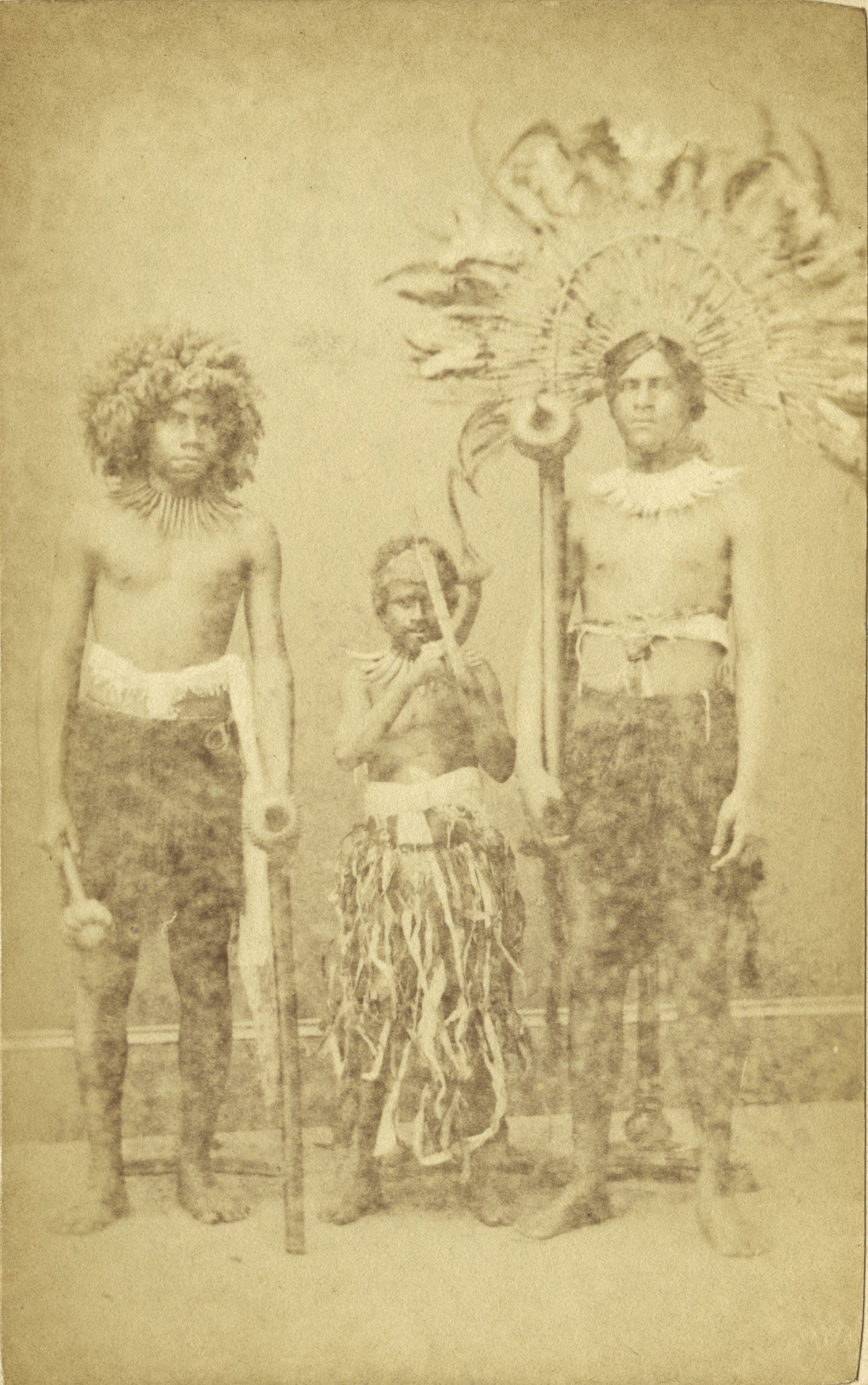
"Fijian Chiefs & Dwarf" photograph by Menzies Dickson, ca. 1867.

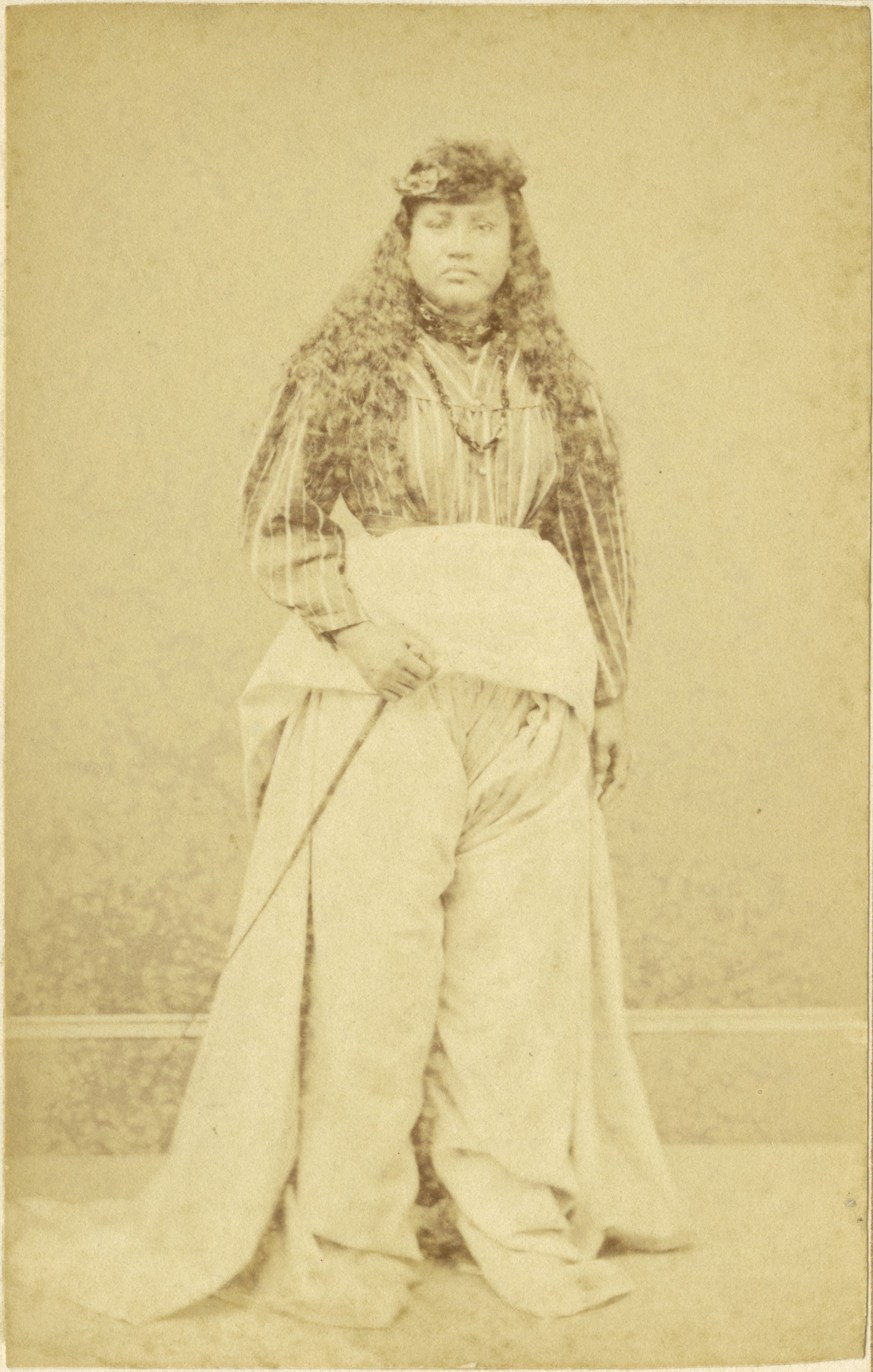
Hawaiian in riding dress, ca. 1867

Menzies Dickson (c. 1840 – 1891) was a photographer in Hawaii.

== Life ==
He was born in 1840 in Charlestown, Massachusetts. He served in the Union Navy during the American Civil War. In 1867, he came to the Kingdom of Hawaii from Cincinnati and established a photograph studio on Fort Street in Honolulu. He took many portraits, and some photographs of sights and objects. James J. Williams (1853–1926) worked in his studio, buying it out in 1882. Subjects of his portraits included John Adams Cummins, Archibald Scott Cleghorn, Kalakaua, poi dealer, grass dealer, Kamehameha IV, Kapiolani (1879), Keelikolani, Keelikolani with Parker and Cummins, Leleiohoku, Likelike (1868), Liliuokalani, Major Moehonua, Martin and Moehonua (survivors of Honolulu Courthouse riot of 1874), Queen Emma (1871) wearing Niihau lei, Queen Kapiolani, and William Pitt Leleiohoku (1874 or 1876). He also photographed the Princeville plantation in Hanalei, the Punchbowl Crater and Waiuli (Wailua) Lower Falls on Kauai.

After selling his studio to Williams, he went into the ranching business as manager of the Kawailoa ranch in Waialua. Dickson died on May 31, 1891, at his residence in the Palama district of Honolulu.
