= Mary Jane Kekulani Fayerweather =

Hawaiian musician, teacher, rancher (1842–1930)

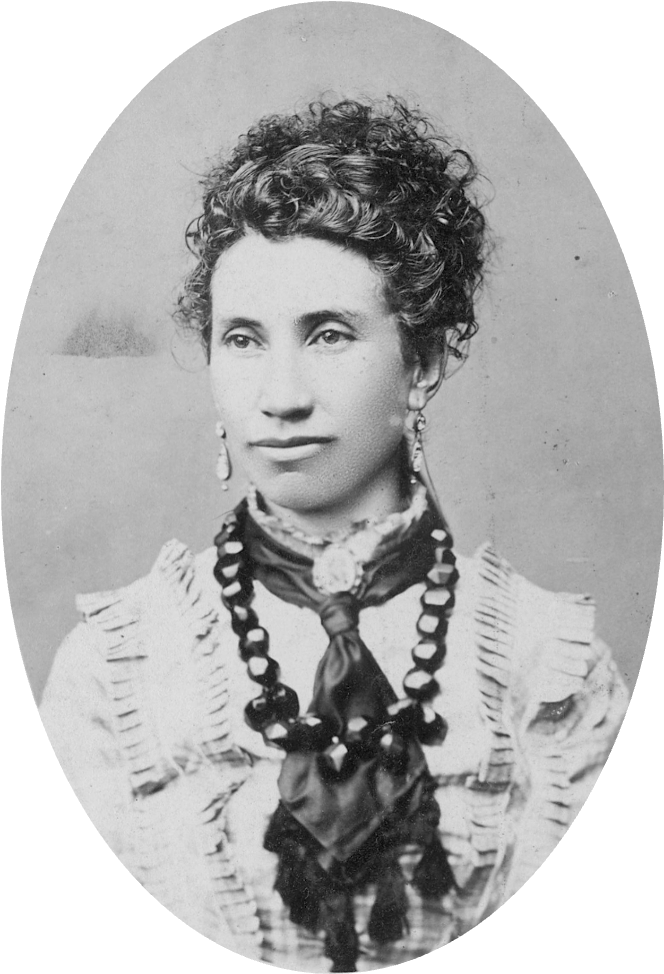
- Born: Mary Jane Ahia Ahuena Kekulani Fayerweather; May 14, 1842; Honolulu, Hawaiian Kingdom
- Died: November 8, 1930 (aged 88); Honolulu, Territory of Hawaii
- Resting place: Oʻahu Cemetery
- Other names: Mary Jane Kekulani Fayerweather Davison Montano, Mary Jane Kekulani Davison, Mary Jane Kekulani Montano
- Occupations: Musician, composer, teacher, dairy farmer, rancher
- Spouse(s): Benoni Richmond Davison (m. 1864–1875; his death), Andreas Avelino Montano (m. 1877–1913; his death)
- Children: 5, including Rose C. Davison, Emma Ahuena Taylor
- Relatives: Julia Fayerweather Afong (sister); George Charles Beckley (grandfather); Chun Afong (brother-in-law)

Mary Jane Ahia Ahuena Kekulani Fayerweather (May 14, 1842 – November 8, 1930) was a Hawaiian high chiefess (ali'i), composer, musician, teacher, rancher, and cultural historian of Native Hawaiian, British, and American descent. She worked as a teacher in Honolulu before her first of two marriages and later became a rancher and dairy farmer in Mānoa. She composed Hawaiian poetry, chants, and mele and was regarded as an authority on Hawaiian genealogy and culture. She also preserved and transmitted Hawaiian cultural traditions, contributing older mele and genealogical knowledge to historical collections and the Hawaiian-language press and publishing recollections of 19th-century Hawaii. She was the maternal granddaughter of George Charles Beckley, an early 19th-century English sea captain and merchant, and was also known by the married names Mary Jane Kekulani Fayerweather Davison Montano, Mary Jane Kekulani Davison, and Mary Jane Kekulani Montano.

== Early life and family ==
Mary Jane Kekulani Fayerweather was born on May 14, 1842 in Honolulu, under the reign of King Kamehameha III. She was the third-born child and second daughter of Abraham (Abram) Henry Fayerweather and Mary Kekahimoku Kolimoalani Beckley.

Fayerweather was born in the family home at the junction of Union Street and Adams Lane. The frame house had been shipped by her father from Boston around Cape Horn in sections, with its lumber sawn to fit before shipment. Notable Women of Hawaii instead places the home at Union Street and Garden Lane.

Her father, originally from New Canaan, Connecticut, settled in Hawaii and was a business associate of Hunnewell and Peirce before becoming chief accountant of C. Brewer & Co.. Her maternal family was considered part of the aliʻi (noble) class. Her maternal grandfather was George Charles Beckley, an English sea captain and merchant who came to Hawaii in 1806, served in the councils of Kamehameha I, and was appointed the first commandant of the Honolulu fort in 1816. Her maternal grandmother was Elizabeth Ahia, a Native Hawaiian high chiefess who was a distant relation of the reigning House of Kamehameha and a descendant of the 15th-century King Līloa. Through her parents, Fayerweather was one-quarter Native Hawaiian and three-quarters of European ancestry. She was described as small and fair-skinned, with auburn hair, and was proud of her Hawaiian, British, and American heritage.

Her older sister was Julia Fayerweather Afong, wife of Chinese businessman Chun Afong. Her other siblings included William Malulani Fayerweather, who died young; and Hannah Kealiipuahao o Kinau Fayerweather, who married Thomas Kamukamu Bell.

=== Upbringing on Hawaii Island ===
In infancy, Fayerweather was taken to Kohala on the island of Hawaii to be raised under the Hawaiian custom of hānai by her maternal uncle William Beckley and his wife, High Chiefess Ahuenaikamakahonu-i-kaiakekua Beckley, also known as Kamakahonu Wahine. Kamakahonu had helped Fayerweather's father obtain permission to marry her mother and, in return, secured his promise that she could raise one of their children. After he refused to give up his first two children, Kamakahonu took Fayerweather, their third child, shortly after her birth aboard the Manuokawai and brought her to Hawaii. Kamakahonu, whom Fayerweather described as her adopted mother, died when Fayerweather was about two years old. William Beckley subsequently married Kahinu, a daughter of High Chief Hoʻolulu, who thereafter raised Fayerweather as her mother.

Fayerweather spent her early childhood in Waimea, in the Kohala region, where she was raised in a traditional Hawaiian household, spoke only Hawaiian, and was treated as a kapu (sacred) child. She lived in her own grass house and had few playmates, accompanied by a servant when she went to play with other children. Her nurse and governess, Kahuluhulu, taught her Hawaiian language and grammar, and Fayerweather later described her as her "Mother Goose book". She also learned Hawaiian culture and legends and began a lifelong study of genealogy, and her upbringing in Kohala later influenced her poetry and music. Her grandmother Ahia Beckley also instructed her in traditional chiefly customs and appropriate conduct toward members of the Hawaiian royal family, with whom her family had longstanding personal and familial connections.

=== Return to Oahu ===
Fayerweather returned to her family in Honolulu around 1849. Her return required an adjustment from her Hawaiian upbringing to Western customs, including Western dress and table manners. Soon after her return, Kamehameha III visited her mother at the family home. On seeing Fayerweather, the king placed his hand on her head and referred to her in Hawaiian as the "little white head", after which she was instructed to salute him. Fayerweather later recalled that Kamehameha III had given her the name Kekulani in connection with an incident involving himself and Keoni Ana.

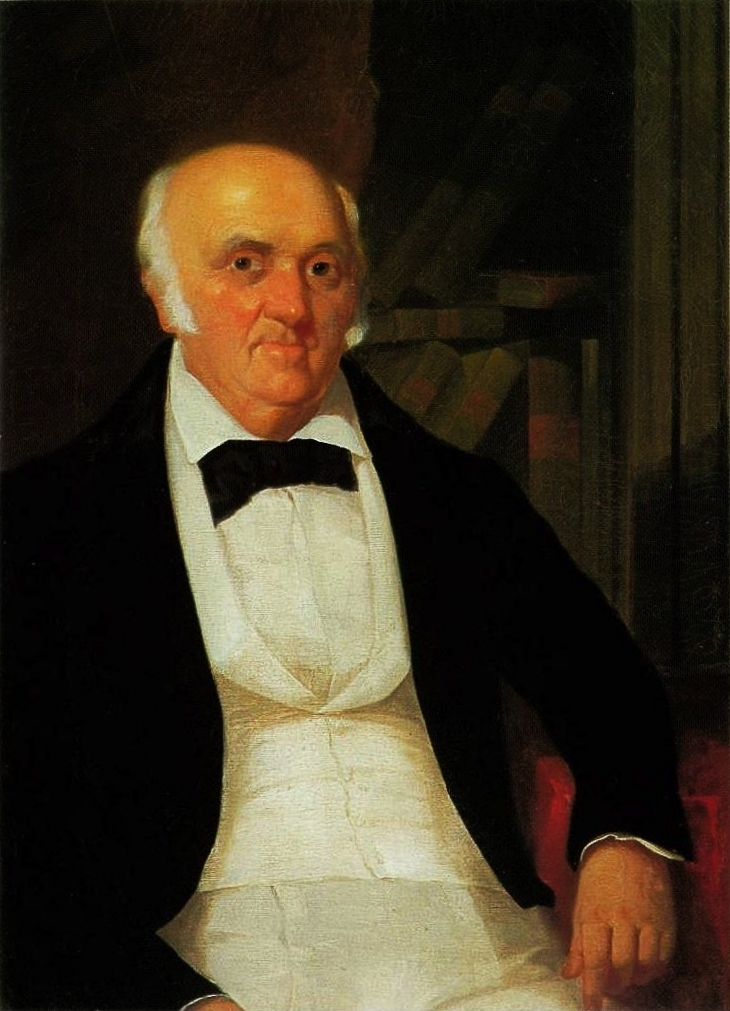
Stephen Reynolds, Fayerweather's guardian after the deaths of her parents. Portrait by John Mix Stanley, 1848.

After returning to her parents, Fayerweather attended a select school operated by Mrs. Sarah Davis Gummer and her mother Mrs. Davis on King Street near Alakea Street, where her classmates included Rebecca Meek. Both of Fayerweather's parents died in 1850, her mother in April and her father later that year in November. Fayerweather recalled that her father was deeply affected by his wife's death and subsequently sold his sugar plantation at Waimea, disposed of much of his other property, and purchased the bark Helen Mar, intending to take his children to Savannah, Georgia, where he planned to manage his aunt's cotton plantation. He became ill and died before the family could leave Hawaii. Members of his Masonic lodge cared for him during his final illness and participated in his funeral. Shortly afterward, Stephen Reynolds, a fellow merchant and Mason, was appointed guardian of Fayerweather and her sisters Julia and Hannah and administrator of their father's estate.

The sisters were placed at Mrs. Wiseman's boarding school at the corner of Beretania and Punchbowl streets. After the school closed about a year later, Fayerweather attended Mrs. Bingham's private school on Hotel Street in 1851 and 1852. At Mrs. Bingham's school, mornings were devoted to academic studies and afternoons to needlework and other fancy work, in which Fayerweather developed a lifelong interest. Fayerweather subsequently lived in Reynolds's household, where she participated in weekly dancing lessons and monthly social gatherings intended in part to teach the children manners and social etiquette. Contemporary correspondence from Reynolds records that Julia continued lessons at Mrs. Bingham's school while Mary Jane and Hannah attended Mililani School, then known as the Honolulu Free School. Reynolds reported that the girls' boarding, clothing, and schooling costs were drawing on the capital of their relatively small inheritance. After becoming dissatisfied with another teacher, Fayerweather was introduced by Reynolds to George B. C. Ingraham, principal of Mililani School. Despite her older sister Julia's concern that attending a charity school would be socially embarrassing, Fayerweather later recalled that she was never ashamed of having attended Mililani because it had given her a good education. As a student there, she received the school's monthly academic honor three times, which entitled the recipient to dine with the British Consul General William Miller at his home next to Washington Place.

When Reynolds's mental health failed, Fayerweather and her sisters returned to the household of their uncle William Beckley and grandmother Ahia. Just before Christmas 1856, the court appointed Gerrit P. Judd as their guardian, despite the sisters' preference that their uncle William assume their guardianship. The sisters were subsequently separated: Hannah boarded with missionary educator Maria Ogden, who taught Hawaiian and hapa haole girls at her school on Beretania Street; Julia was placed with the Bartlett family; and Fayerweather, at age 14, was sent to live with Warren Fay Chamberlain, son of missionary Levi Chamberlain, and his wife Celia in Waialua.

She made the journey from Honolulu on horseback with Chamberlain and, already a good rider, later had a horse of her own at Waialua. The move came during a period of considerable loss and separation from her family. Her grandmother Ahia and her nurse Kahuluhulu died within a short time of one another, while her sisters had been sent to separate households and she had to leave her uncle William, who had been a father figure to her since infancy. Fayerweather was particularly affected by the death of Kahuluhulu, who had cared for her since infancy and whom she remembered as having been more than a mother to her. She nevertheless remembered the Chamberlain household as a happy home and remained there for about four years. She studied with Mrs. Chamberlain in the afternoons and learned household management in the mornings, while also becoming acquainted with members of Oahu's missionary and business families. In 1860, despite Mrs. Chamberlain asking her to remain, Fayerweather chose to return to her uncle's household in Honolulu.

=== Teaching and social life in Honolulu ===
In 1860, Fayerweather rejoined the household of her uncle William Beckley and his third wife, Mary Ann Kameʻehiwa Tressilyan Beckley, who was regarded as the most beautiful woman of Kamehameha IV's court and was called the "Rose of the Pacific". Her younger sister Hannah was also living with them, while her older sister Julia had by then married Chun Afong and had her first child.

At the same time, her former teacher, Mr. Ingraham, invited her to return to Mililani School as an assistant teacher, taking the place of her friend Clara Armstrong. By then, Mililani had expanded into a two-story schoolhouse. Ingraham taught approximately 40 older pupils upstairs, while Fayerweather taught about 60 beginning pupils downstairs with one assistant. She remained at Mililani for about four years and later recalled with pride that many of her former students had become “fine men and women in Honolulu.”

During these years, German consul William Pflüger placed Fayerweather on Honolulu's social list, beginning what she called her "social whirl". Her social life brought her into close contact with members of the royal court. During the fundraising campaign to establish the Queen's Hospital, Queen Emma personally visited homes in Honolulu seeking assistance. Fayerweather was assigned to make a moss mat for the effort, and Queen Emma taught her how to make it. Princess Victoria Kamāmalu frequently visited the Beckley home with other members of her circle, and Fayerweather recalled accompanying the young women who collected fabric samples in Honolulu for the princess to select for her dresses. On one occasion, Fayerweather dressed Kamāmalu's hair for the wedding of Lydia Kamakaʻeha (the future Liliʻuokalani) in 1862, an undertaking she remembered as intimidating because of the etiquette surrounding physical contact with a high-ranking aliʻi.

Fayerweather resigned from Mililani upon her marriage in 1864. She retained an interest in education later in life. In 1909, she wrote to Ka Nupepa Kuokoa opposing reductions in teachers' salaries and urging greater investment in public education, particularly for Native Hawaiian children.

== Marriage and ranching ==
During these years, Fayerweather met Benoni Richmond Davison, a native of New Bedford, Massachusetts, who had worked as a pharmacist in Wilmington, Delaware before arriving in the Hawaiian Islands around 1860. Davison had previously worked at a drugstore in Lahaina before moving to Honolulu when the United States Marine Hospital was transferred there. By 1864, he was superintendent of the hospital, then located on Punchbowl Street. Fayerweather and Davison married on July 4, 1864, in a ceremony performed by Rev. Samuel C. Damon. Their wedding coincided with Honolulu's Fourth of July ball, for which Davison served as a floor manager. After their wedding supper, the newlyweds attended the ball.

In September 1866, when the Hawaiian government opened the Oahu Insane Asylum, Davison became assistant superintendent under Seth Porter Ford, the institution's superintendent. He subsequently became superintendent of the asylum. Fayerweather also assisted Davison in caring for patients associated with the insane asylum. Among them was former missionary and businessman Amos Starr Cooke, who suffered from what contemporaries described as "softening of the brain". Cooke was accommodated in a room in the Davison home rather than in the asylum ward, and Fayerweather personally assisted in his care.

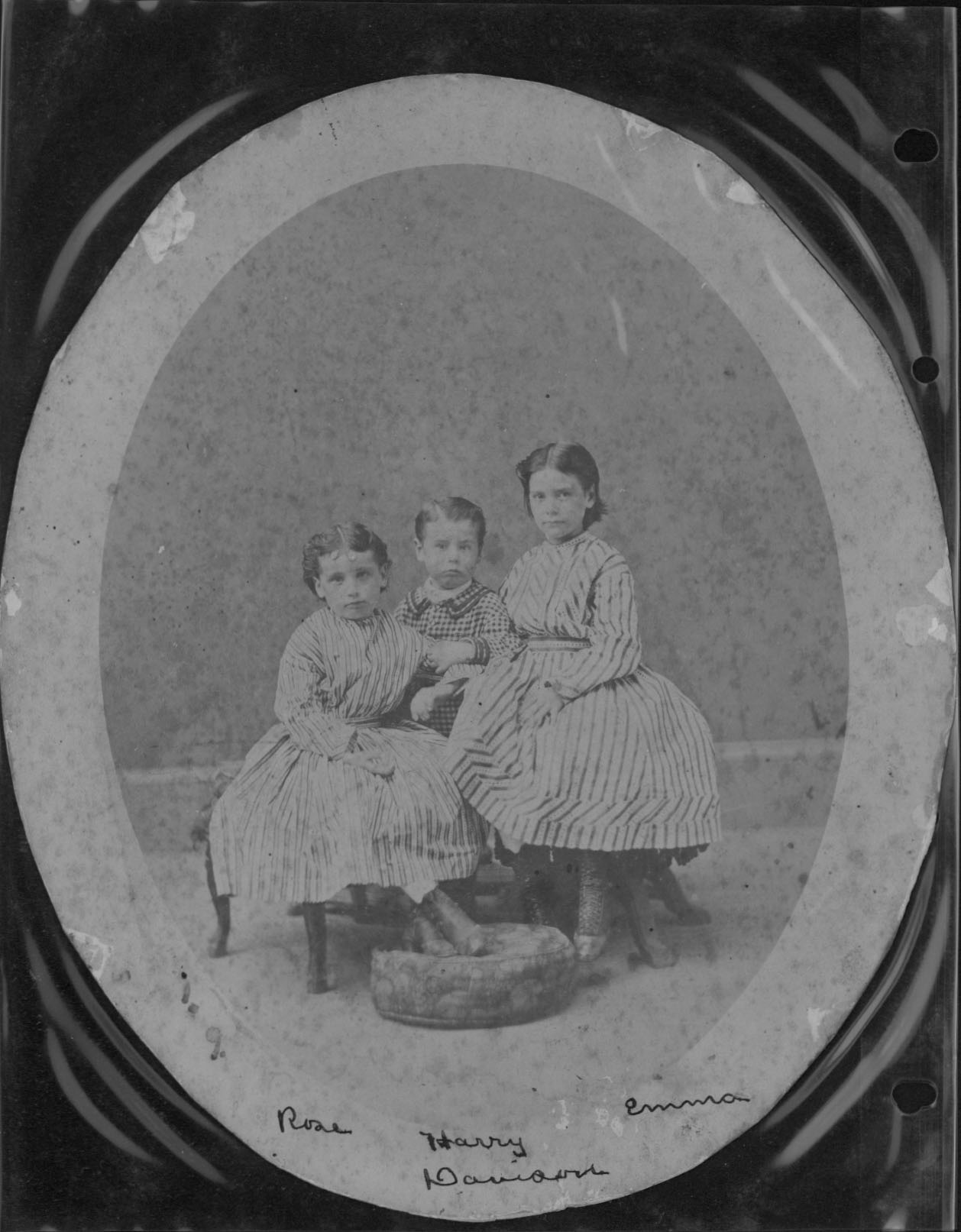
Three of Fayerweather's children: Rose, Harry and Emma

Together they had five children: William Compton Malulani Davison (1865), who died in infancy; Emma Ahuena Davison Taylor (1867); Rose Compton Davison (1868); Henry (Harry) Fayerweather Davison (1870); and Marie Hope Kekulani Davison Brown (1874).

Fayerweather continued to participate in Honolulu's royal and chiefly social life during her marriage. In 1869, she and Davison were formally invited by Kamehameha V to a ball at ʻIolani Palace honoring Prince Alfred, Duke of Edinburgh, the second son of Queen Victoria, who was visiting Hawaii while commanding the Royal Navy frigate HMS Galatea on an extended world tour. Kamehameha V also invited Fayerweather to participate in a grand lūʻau at the king's private residence, Helumoa, in the duke's honor, instructing her to wear a white holokū and lei mamo. At the lūʻau, she was assigned to Queen Emma's group, while her cousin Maria Kahaʻawelani Beckley was assigned to that of Bernice Pauahi Bishop. Fayerweather later recalled the occasion as the grandest lūʻau she had ever witnessed.

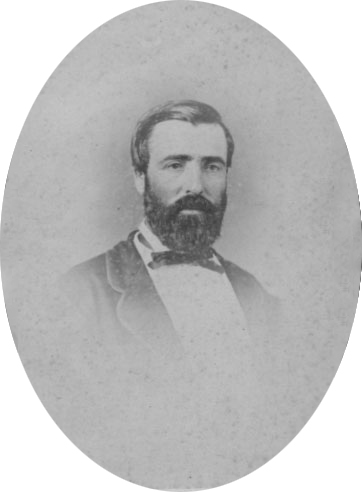
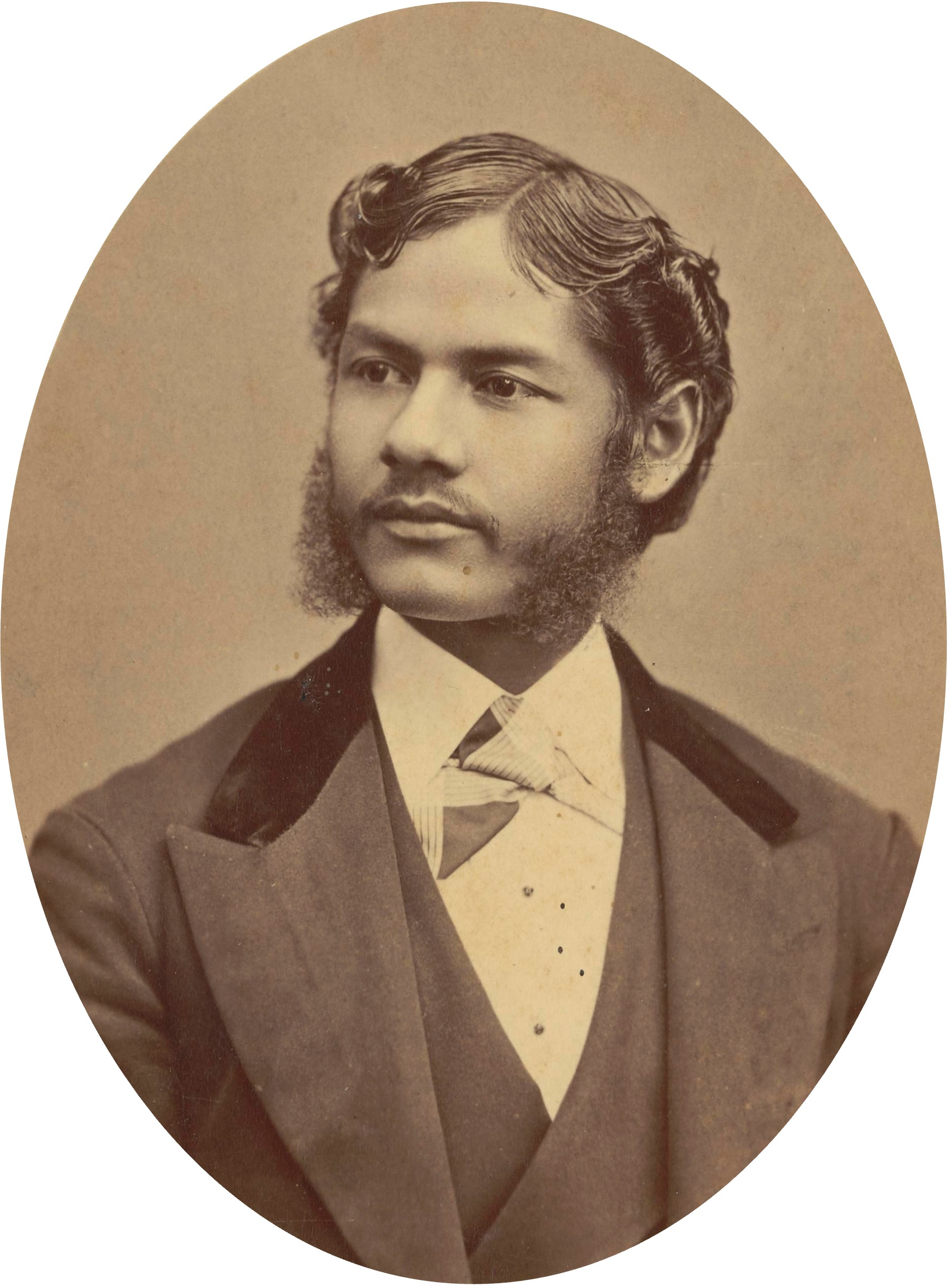
Fayerweather's husbands, Benoni Richmond Davison and Andreas Avelino Montano

Davison died unexpectedly at their home at Waikuakio in the Pālama district of Honolulu on July 3, 1875, at the age of 40, leaving Fayerweather a widow with four surviving children. Two years later, on June 16, 1877, she married Andreas Avelino Montano (A. A. Montano), a photographer and portrait painter who was born in 1847 in Colombia and had come to Hawaii in 1876. When Montano had proposed marriage, Fayerweather responded by composing a song for him. He later became a rancher. Montano had a photo studio at 87 Fort Street in 1876 and photographed many notable Hawaiians, including Queen Emma and King Kalākaua. Following their marriage, Fayerweather and Montano lived on School Street.

Fayerweather with her youngest daughter, Marie Hope, c. 1879

By 1883, Fayerweather and her second husband moved to the Mānoa Valley, where they ran a ranch and dairy farm called Kaʻaipu (or Kaipu) and where she lived for nearly 50 years. The property took its name from a stone deity found on the land, which was believed to bring good or bad fortune depending on how it was treated. By 1889, the Kaʻaipu Dairy had prospered and Montano closed his photo studio in Honolulu so they could purchase more land in Mānoa, including property formerly belonging to the family of John Papa ʻĪʻī. Fayerweather also kept a flock of approximately 1,500 Leghorn hens. In 1897, the Montanos were among the organizers of the Honolulu Dairymen's Association. They had also acquired the triangular parcel at the junction of Mānoa and East Mānoa roads, which Fayerweather subsequently donated to the city and which became the present-day Mānoa Triangle Park.

Fayerweather was remembered as a gracious hostess whose Mānoa home received many visitors. Although she made no claims to special status, her granddaughters recalled that Hawaiian visitors showed her considerable respect and deference. A family friend recalled Fayerweather and Liliʻuokalani telling Hawaiian legends to children gathered at the home. Shortly before Liliʻuokalani's death in 1917, Fayerweather recalled that the former queen visited her and that the two reminisced about their childhood.

During the political upheavals of the 1890s, Montano became a citizen of the Republic of Hawaii, served as a tax assessor, and was a member of the Annexation Club. Despite Fayerweather's personal association with Liliʻuokalani, her own views on the 1893 overthrow of the Hawaiian monarchy and subsequent annexation by the United States are unknown. During the 1895 Wilcox rebellion, their residence was requisitioned for use as military headquarters.

Several of her children became prominent in Honolulu's civic and educational life. Henry was a designer and artist; Rose was commissioned as the first woman police officer for the Hawaiian Humane Society; Emma became a writer and authority on Hawaiiana and translated many of her mother's songs and chants into English; and Marie became an educator and principal of Lunalilo School. Emma married journalist and historian Albert Pierce Taylor, who learned about Hawaiian history and culture from both his wife and mother-in-law and later drew on this knowledge in his historical work, including Under Hawaiian Skies.

== Music and cultural work ==
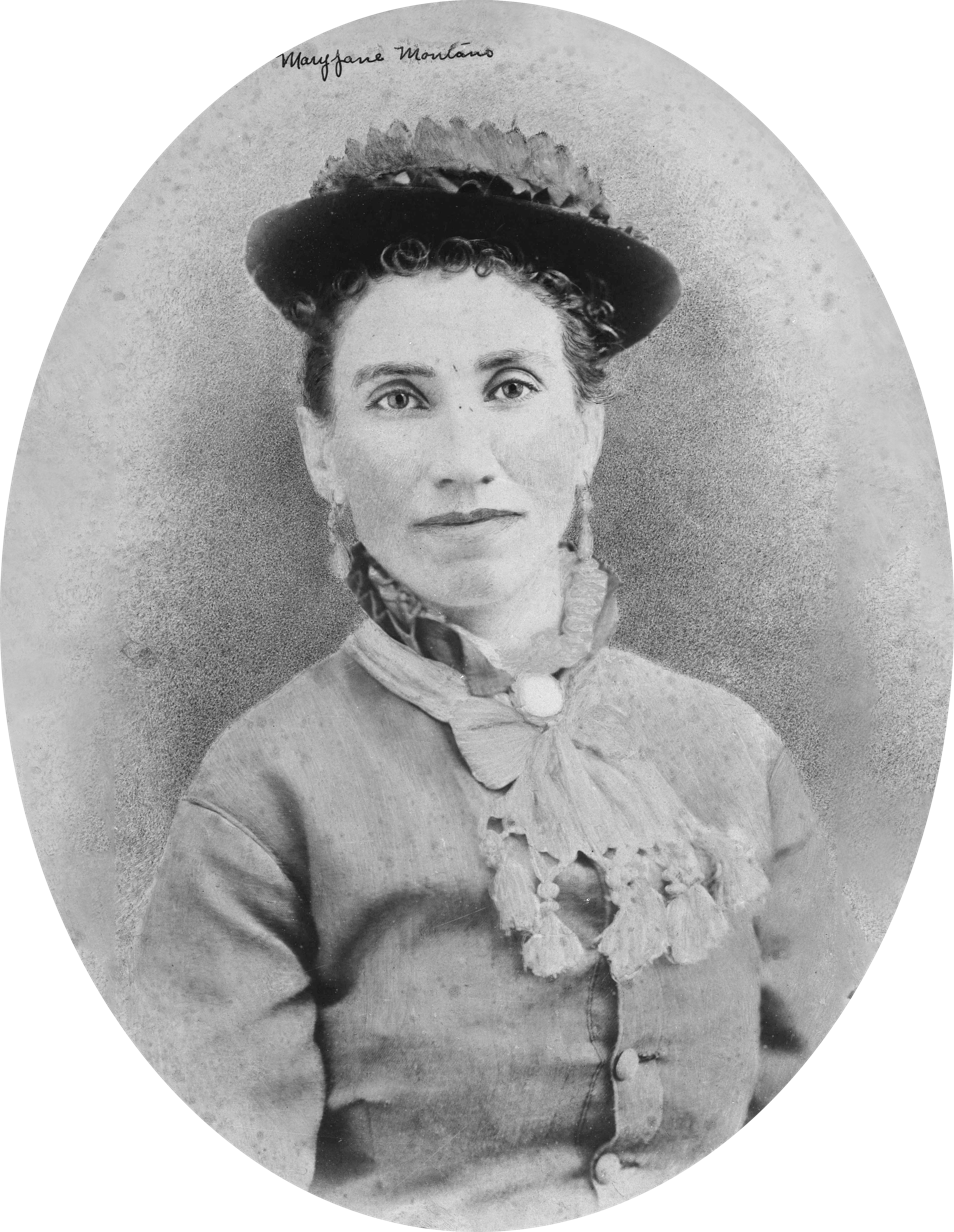
Mary Jane Kekulani Fayerweather

Fayerweather was a prolific composer of Hawaiian poetry, chants, and mele (songs), many of which were set to music by Charles E. King. Her notable compositions included "Kuʻu Home", also known as "Old Plantation", which was written for her childhood friend Victoria Ward and set to music by David Nape, "Maid of Honolulu", and "Beautiful Kahana", which she dedicated to Mary E. Foster. Other compositions included "Nene Hanu Aʻala", "Mauna Aʻala", and "Pua Loke Lani". Many of her songs and name chants commemorated events involving her family and friends. She also wrote "Honolulu Aina Kupua" ("Honolulu, Our Fairy Land") for the fourth anniversary of The Outdoor Circle, a Honolulu civic beautification organization, in 1916. Her mele "Na Kamalei o Hawaii", composed in 1918 and published in Ka Nupepa Kuokoa in 1919, honored Hawaiian servicemen fighting in World War I. It was later reprinted in Paradise of the Pacific with a dedication to her cousin George Healiʻi Kahea Beckley and the men of Hawaii who had served in the war. In 1922, she composed a name song for the Māmakakaua Association (Daughters and Sons of Hawaiian Warriors). She also wrote "Haaheo Kilohana i ka Lai", a name song for the Honolulu Academy of Arts dedicated to Anna Rice Cooke, which was set to music by Bina Mossman.

Fayerweather was regarded as an authority on Hawaiian customs, genealogy, language, and culture and was frequently consulted on these subjects. Her knowledge drew on her traditional Hawaiian upbringing, the teachings and oral traditions of older members of the Beckley family, and her lifelong participation in Hawaiian chiefly and royal circles. Her reminiscences document her associations with prominent aliʻi, including Ruth Keʻelikōlani, Bernice Pauahi Bishop, Queen Emma and Liliʻuokalani. She later assisted her daughter Emma in planning and directing historical pageants that recreated events and social life from Hawaiian history. Their historical work included the seventy-fifth anniversary celebration of Punahou School in 1916, a pageant held on Rocky Hill with a cast of hundreds. In 1924, Fayerweather contributed her own collection of Hawaiian mele to a collection of ancient Hawaiian music and mele compiled by ethnomusicologist Helen Heffron Roberts for the Hawaiian Legends and Folklore Commission.

In her later years, Fayerweather recorded her memories of 19th-century Hawaii and its people. Her reminiscences included accounts of her grandfather George Charles Beckley, members of the Hawaiian royal family, Honolulu society, the California Gold Rush, the 1853 smallpox epidemic, and other events and individuals from the Hawaiian Kingdom. A series of these reminiscences was published in The Honolulu Advertiser in 1923 and 1924. In 1927, she also contributed older Hawaiian mele and accompanying genealogical information to Ka Nupepa Kuokoa.

Her private notes, diaries, letters, and manuscript drafts, together with those of her daughter Emma Ahuena Taylor, are held in the Hawaii State Archives. Among the archives' holdings is an eighteenth-century engraving after a drawing by John Webber, Tereoboo, King of Hawaii, Owyhee, bringing presents to Capt. Cook, depicting Kalaniʻōpuʻu presenting gifts to Captain James Cook. The archival catalog states that the engraving had previously belonged to Kamehameha IV and was presented to Fayerweather on the occasion of her first marriage in 1864.

== Death and burial ==
Fayerweather died in Honolulu on November 8, 1930. At her death, the Lunalilo News, written and printed by sixth-grade students at Lunalilo School, dedicated that week's issue to her. The eulogy stated: "Deeply religious, charitable in deed and thought, kindly and affectionate, she will long be remembered as well deserving the respect and regard that is so widely accorded her."

She was buried at Oʻahu Cemetery, where she shares a marker with her son Henry Fayerweather Davison.

== Publications and works ==
- Montano, Mary Jane Fayerweather (December 2, 1923). "Granddaughter of Capt. George Beckley, Kamehameha's "Field Marshal" Tells Of His Colorful Career In Hawaii – Drama Of Old Hawaii Made Real In Fascinating Story Of Picturesque Early Actors – Englishmen, Americans, Russians and Men of Other "Haole" Nations Move In Interesting Array Through Reminiscences of Grande Dame of the Old Regime". The Honolulu Advertiser. Honolulu. p. 1 – via Newspapers.com.
- Montano, Mary Jane Fayerweather (December 2, 1923). "Drama Of Old Hawaii Made Picturesque (Continued from Page 1)". The Honolulu Advertiser. Honolulu. p. 13 – via Newspapers.com.
- Montano, Mary Jane Fayerweather (December 9, 1923). "Personal Reminiscences Of Old-Time Hawaii And Noted Actors In Stirring Drama – How Many of the Chiefs Joined in the California Gold Rush and Died of Frontier Hardships; Terror of Smallpox Scourge of 1853 When Thousands Died Throughout Islands". The Honolulu Advertiser. Honolulu. p. 9 – via Newspapers.com.
- Montano, Mary Jane Fayerweather (December 9, 1923). "Mrs. Montano's Reminiscences Of Old Hawaii (Continued from Page 9)". The Honolulu Advertiser. Honolulu. p. 10 – via Newspapers.com.
- Montano, Mary Jane Fayerweather (December 16, 1923). "Former Belle Tells Of Honolulu Society In Far-Off 'Sixties' – Mrs. Montano Continues Her Charming Reminiscences of Old Hawaii; Notable Characters and Incidents Revived After Six Decades During Which Community Has Moved Far, Far Away From Them". The Honolulu Advertiser. Honolulu. p. 5 – via Newspapers.com.
- Montano, Mary Jane Fayerweather (December 16, 1923). "Former Belle Tells Of Society In Old Honolulu (Continued from Page 5)". The Honolulu Advertiser. Honolulu. p. 6 – via Newspapers.com.
- Montano, Mary Jane Fayerweather (December 25, 1923). "Quaint Recollections Of Hawaiian Royalty In Picturesque Year – Mrs. Montano Continues Reminiscenses – How Queen Emma Started Fund for Hospital – Palace Named for Prince – Duke of Edinburgh's Visit Memorable in Hawaiian History – Leisure Time of Chiefesses". The Honolulu Advertiser. Honolulu. p. 12 – via Newspapers.com.
- Montano, Mary Jane Fayerweather (December 25, 1923). "Recollections of Hawaiian Kings Of Long Ago (Continued from Page 12)". The Honolulu Advertiser. Honolulu. p. 13 – via Newspapers.com.
- Montano, Mary Jane Fayerweather (January 6, 1924). "When Admiral Wilkes Was Host To Honolulu's Society In The Brave Civil War Days – Mrs. Montano Continues Her Charming Reminiscences of Old Hawaii; Among Other Intriguing Matters She Tells of Reputed Secret Cave Under Diamond Head and Waikiki". The Honolulu Advertiser. Honolulu. p. 6 – via Newspapers.com.
- Montano, Mary Jane Fayerweather (January 6, 1924). "When Wilkes Was Host To Society In Civil War Days (Continued from Page 6)". The Honolulu Advertiser. Honolulu. p. 8 – via Newspapers.com.
- Montano, Mary Jane Fayerweather (April 18, 1924). "How To Cook Taro". The Honolulu Advertiser. Honolulu. p. 9 – via Newspapers.com.
- Montano, Mary Jane Fayerweather (December 2, 1923). "Granddaughter of Capt. George Beckley, Kamehameha's "Field Marshal" Tells Of His Colorful Career In Hawaii – Drama Of Old Hawaii Made Real In Fascinating Story Of Picturesque Early Actors – Englishmen, Americans, Russians and Men of Other "Haole" Nations Move In Interesting Array Through Reminiscences of Grande Dame of the Old Regime". The Honolulu Advertiser. Honolulu. p. 1 – via Newspapers.com.
- Montano, Mary Jane Fayerweather (December 2, 1923). "Drama Of Old Hawaii Made Picturesque (Continued from Page 1)". The Honolulu Advertiser. Honolulu. p. 13 – via Newspapers.com.
- Montano, Mary Jane Fayerweather (December 16, 1923). "Former Belle Tells Of Honolulu Society In Far-Off 'Sixties' – Mrs. Montano Continues Her Charming Reminiscences of Old Hawaii; Notable Characters and Incidents Revived After Six Decades During Which Community Has Moved Far, Far Away From Them". The Honolulu Advertiser. Honolulu. p. 5 – via Newspapers.com.
- Montano, Mary Jane Fayerweather (December 16, 1923). "Former Belle Tells Of Society In Old Honolulu (Continued from Page 5)". The Honolulu Advertiser. Honolulu. p. 6 – via Newspapers.com.
- Montano, Mary Jane Fayerweather (December 25, 1923). "Recollections of Hawaiian Kings Of Long Ago (Continued from Page 12)". The Honolulu Advertiser. Honolulu. p. 13 – via Newspapers.com.
- Montano, Mary Jane Fayerweather (January 6, 1924). "When Admiral Wilkes Was Host To Honolulu's Society In The Brave Civil War Days – Mrs. Montano Continues Her Charming Reminiscences of Old Hawaii; Among Other Intriguing Matters She Tells of Reputed Secret Cave Under Diamond Head and Waikiki". The Honolulu Advertiser. Honolulu. p. 6 – via Newspapers.com.
- Montano, Mary Jane Fayerweather (January 6, 1924). "When Wilkes Was Host To Society In Civil War Days (Continued from Page 6)". The Honolulu Advertiser. Honolulu. p. 8 – via Newspapers.com.
- Montano, Mary Jane Fayerweather (April 18, 1924). "How To Cook Taro". The Honolulu Advertiser. Honolulu. p. 9 – via Newspapers.com.

== Bibliography ==
- Bouslog, Charles; Greig, Thelma (1994). Mānoa: the Story of a Valley. Honolulu: Mutual Publishing. ISBN 978-1-56647-067-4. OCLC 32599587.
- Dye, Bob (1997). Merchant Prince of the Sandalwood Mountains: Afong and the Chinese in Hawaiʻi. Honolulu: University of Hawaii Press. ISBN 978-0-8248-1772-5. OCLC 247424976.
- Lam, Margaret M. (1932). Six Generations of Race Mixture in Hawaii. Honolulu: University of Hawaii, Sociology MA Thesis. OCLC 16325277.
- Nellist, George Ferguson Mitchell (1929–1938). Women of Hawaii. Honolulu: E.A. Langton-Boyle. OCLC 16328319.
- Nebelung, Raymond G.; Schmitt, Robert C. (1948). Hawaii's Hospitals, Past, Present and Future. Honolulu: Public Health Committee, Chamber of Commerce of Honolulu – via National Library of Medicine.
- New England Historic Genealogical Society (1992). The New England Historical and Genealogical Register. Boston: New England Historic Genealogical Society. OCLC 2564052.
- Peterson, Barbara Bennett (1984). Notable Women of Hawaii. Honolulu: University of Hawaii Press. ISBN 978-0-8248-0820-4. OCLC 11030010.
- Severson, Don R.; Horikawa, Michael D.; Saville, Jennifer (2002). Finding Paradise: Island Art in Private Collections. Honolulu: Honolulu Academy of Arts; University of Hawaiʻi Press. ISBN 978-0-8248-2657-4. OCLC 123158782.
- Taylor, Albert Pierce (1922). Under Hawaiian Skies: A Narrative of the Romance, Adventure and History of the Hawaiian Islands. Honolulu: Advertiser Publishing Company, Ltd. OCLC 479709.
- Trapido, Evelyn (May 1984). "Mary Jane Montano: A Child of Two Cultures" (PDF). Historic Hawai'i. 10 (5): 6–7.
