= Rose C. Davison =

Native Hawaiian politician

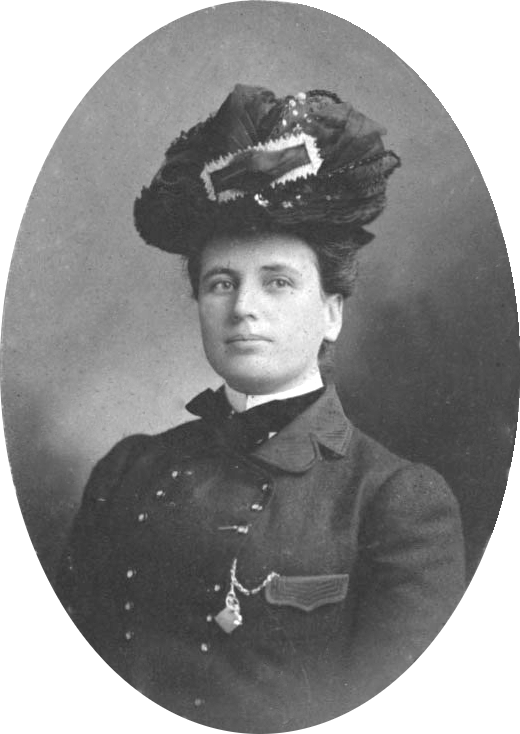
- Rose C. Davison, 1901
- Born: Rosalie Compton Kahipuleokalaniahumanu Davison; September 22, 1868; Honolulu, Kingdom of Hawaii
- Died: May 26, 1913 (aged 44); Honolulu, Territory of Hawaii
- Resting place: Oahu Cemetery
- Education: Punahou School
- Occupations: Educator, government agent, humane officer, social worker
- Mother: Mary Jane Kekulani Fayerweather
- Relatives: Emma Ahuena Taylor (sister); Julia Fayerweather Afong (aunt); George Charles Beckley (maternal great grandfather)

Rosalie Compton Kahipuleokalaniahumanu Davison, known as Rose C. Davison, (September 22, 1868 – May 26, 1913) was a Kingdom of Hawaiian female educator, philanthropist and governmental social worker, who was part Native Hawaiian. She served as assistant secretary of the Board of Education of the Territory of Hawaii and represented Hawaii in the 1901 Pan-American Exposition in Buffalo, New York.

== Early life and education ==
Rosalie Compton Kahipuleokalaniahumanu Davison was born on September 22, 1868, in Honolulu, Kingdom of Hawaii, to American pharmacist Benoni Richmond Davison and British-Hawaiian chiefess Mary Jane Kekulani Fayerweather, the granddaughter of the British Captain George Charles Beckley and Ahia, a distant relation of the reigning House of Kamehameha and descendant of the 15th-century King Līloa. Her siblings included William Compton Malulani, Emma Ahuena, Henry Fayerweather, and Marie Hope Kekulani. Her father died in 1875 and her mother later remarried to photographer A. A. Montano in 1877.

She was initially educated at St. Andrew's Priory School and Fort Street School and later graduated from Oahu College (the modern-day Punahou School). After finishing school, Davison worked as a schoolteacher and became the first English language instructor at the government school in the Mānoa Valley in 1889. She later worked as a governmental school agent and was appointed as assistant secretary of the Territory of Hawaii Board of Education under the leadership of Alatau T. Atkinson. During the 1900 United States census, she assisted Atkinson who was serving as census superintendent.

== Career ==
In 1901, Davison was appointed by the Department of Public Instruction to head a delegation of Hawaiian educators who attended the Pan-American Exposition in Buffalo, New York. She was charged with assembling an educational exhibit showcasing the products of the students of the islands including school assignments, industrial products and sewing. The intents of the exhibit was to "surprise the American population which yet believes that Hawaii is a land of cannibals". Davison and her retinue of part-Hawaiian ladies, including Mapuana Smith and Miss Ordway, became representatives of "Kanaka civility" in contrast to the hula dancing troupes which have been the main Hawaiian attractions in past international exhibitions.

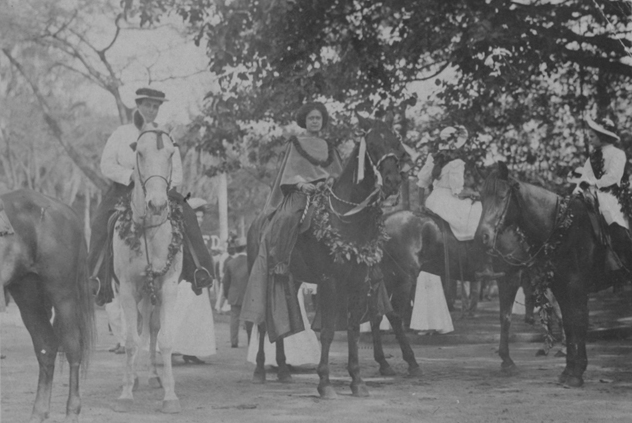
Rose C. Davison leading a troupe of pāʻū riders

Davison was actively involved in philanthropy and the betterment of ill-treated children and animals. Especially devoted to the welfare of dogs and horses from her youth, she was considered "one of the finest horsewoman in the Islands" and helped to arrange pāʻū riders in floral parades. She became involved with the Hawaii Humane Society and received a police commission and appointment in 1909 as humane officer by Sheriff Curtis P. Iaukea. Her duties included inspecting the barns and stables of the islands to ensure compliance with the humane society. She also worked to protect children, especially young girls, taking them from abusive families and placing them in foster care or into industrial schools. She would personally go to the lowly parts of town at night to save the children in these areas. It was noted, "Hardly a school child in the country, whether white or brown but knew Miss Davison and the boys always took off their hats to her as she passed them."

== Illness and death ==
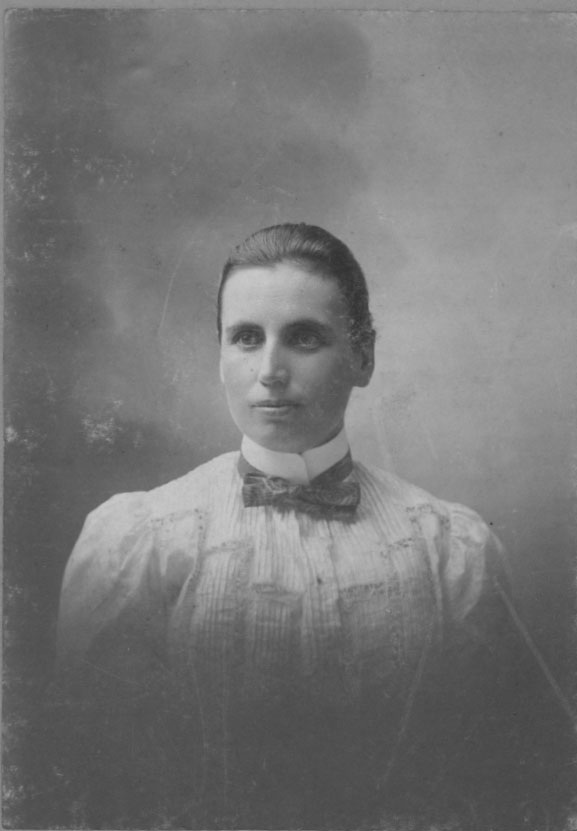
Rose C. Davison

Davison retired from her position as special officer with the Hawaii Humane Society in 1912 due to her illness. A trip to California with her sister Emma did little to improve her health and she returned to Honolulu a few weeks before her death. Two weeks before her death, she was strong enough to visit and inspect stables and barns on Oahu. She fell into a coma and died at her home in the Mānoa Valley, on May 26, 1913. Following a funeral at the Central Union Church, her cremated remains were buried directly over her father's grave at Oahu Cemetery.

Her obituary in the Honolulu Star-Bulletin noted:

Few women will be mourned as she is mourned by this community. Rich and poor, high and low, great and small,—her friends were legion. She was a splendid type of woman, an honor to her Hawaiian-American blood, an honor to woman-kind. Her work as a humane officer was effective, quiet, broad, earnest. Her personality was a rare combination of the alertly vigorous and the womanly sympathetic.

== Bibliography ==
- Bouslog, Charles; Greig, Thelma (1994). Mānoa: the Story of a Valley. Honolulu: Mutual Publishing. ISBN 978-1-56647-067-4. OCLC 32599587.
- Imada, Adria L. (2012). Aloha America: Hula Circuits Through the U.S. Empire. Durham, NC: Duke University Press. ISBN 978-0-8223-5207-5. OCLC 769871251.
- Lam, Margaret M. (1932). Six Generations of Race Mixture in Hawaii. Honolulu: University of Hawaii, Sociology MA Thesis. OCLC 16325277.
- Peterson, Barbara Bennett (1984). Notable Women of Hawaii. Honolulu: University of Hawaii Press. ISBN 978-0-8248-0820-4. OCLC 11030010.
- Yasutake, Rumi (2017). "Re-Franchising Women of Hawaiʻi, 1912–1920: Politics of Gender, Sovereignty, Race, and Rank at the Crossroads of the Pacific". In Choy, Catherine Ceniza; Wu, Judy Tzu-Chun (eds.). Gendering the Trans-Pacific World. Leiden: Brill. ISBN 978-90-04-33610-0. OCLC 976394366.
