= Albert Pierce Taylor =

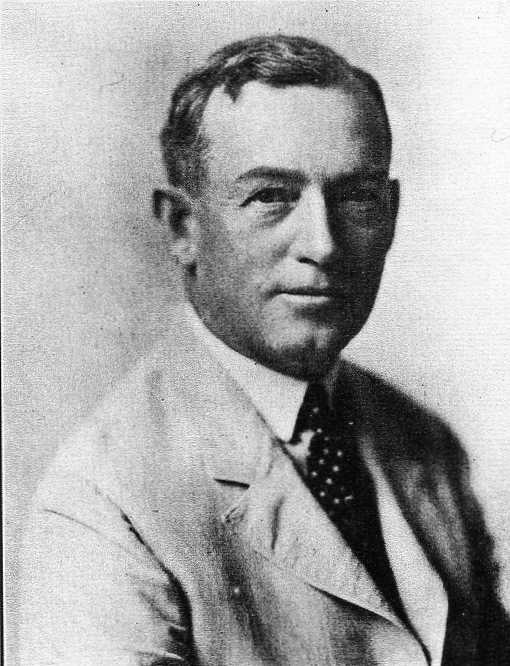

Librarian of the Archives of Hawaii
- In office December 1, 1924 – January 12, 1931

Personal details
- Born: December 18, 1872 St. Louis, Missouri
- Died: January 12, 1931 (aged 58) Honolulu, Territory of Hawaii
- Resting place: Oahu Cemetery
- Spouse(s): Ella De Mund; Emma Ahuena Taylor
- Relations: Mary Jane Kekulani Fayerweather (mother-in-law)
- Children: 1
- Occupation: Journalist, writer, archivists, historian

Albert Pierce Taylor (December 18, 1872 – January 12, 1931) was an American archivist, journalist and historian of the Territory of Hawaii. He served as the Librarian of the Archives of Hawaii from 1924 until his death.

== Life and career ==
Born December 18, 1872, in St. Louis, Missouri, Taylor was the son of George A. Taylor, a Canadian from Nova Scotia, and Melissa Pierce Taylor, whose family was from Illinois and Virginia. He was educated in Leadville, Colorado and graduated in 1890–91 from St. Mark's School in Salt Lake City. He initially worked for the Union Pacific Railroad surveying the route from Salt Lake City to Los Angeles. In 1896, he became as a clerk and later assistant secretary for the Silver Party Party Convention in St. Louis. He went to Washington, DC to manage with the party's headquarter and help with the 1896 presidential campaign of William Jennings Bryan. Promise of a consulship by the party leaders evaporated when Bryan loss to William McKinley. Taylor decided to join the Cuban War of Independence on the side of the rebels but was arrested, imprisoned and deported to New York by the Spanish colonial authorities. He returned to Washington, D.C., where he worked in a patent law office. Around this period, he became acquainted with Hawaiian annexationist Lorrin A. Thurston. He worked as a secretary for Thurston while in Washington and later moved to Honolulu on August 28, 1898, shortly after the American annexation of Hawaii.

Taylor initially worked as a secretary to Walter F. Frear, a Hawaii Supreme Court justice and member of the board of commissioners responsible for drafting the Hawaiian Organic Act. He later worked as deputy clerk to the Hawaii Supreme Court. During the Spanish–American War, he enlisted and fought in the Philippines. After the war, he returned to Honolulu and joined the staff of The Pacific Commercial Advertiser working on and off from 1899 to 1907, 1908 to 1913 and from 1917 to 1924. In between these years, he worked as chief of detectives of Honolulu in 1907 and promotional official for the Territory of Hawaii. He worked as secretary of the Hawaiian Fair Commission to the Panama–Pacific International Exposition from 1913 to 1915 when he was appointed secretary of the Hawaiian Promotion Committee. On December 1, 1924, he was appointed Librarian of the Archives of Hawaii which he held until his death. He was also a member of the member of the Cook Sesquicentennial Commission from 1927 to 1931.

Taylor wrote Fighting a Typhoon, a magazine about his service in the Philippines, and Under Hawaiian Skies, a history of Hawaii. He also contributed numerous papers and articles for the Hawaiian Historical Society and the Paradise of the Pacific magazine. In later life, he served as a Trustee of the Hawaiian Historical Society and was its Recording and Corresponding Secretary until his death. Taylor died on January 12, 1931, and was buried at the Oahu Cemetery.

== Personal life ==
Taylor and his first wife Ella De Mund, from Elkhart, Indiana, were married in 1896 in Baltimore. They had one daughter who married Wesley Peck and resided in California. On November 5, 1902, he married his second wife Emma Ahuena Davison at her mother Mary Jane Kekulani Fayerweather's residence in the Mānoa Valley. Descended from Hawaiian nobility, and the Beckley family, both Emma and her mother were authorities on Hawaiian history, culture and language and provided important influences on Taylor's own historical work. They had no children.

== Works ==
- Taylor, Albert Pierce (1927). The American Navy in Hawaii. Annapolis, MD. OCLC 16339728.
- Taylor, Albert Pierce; Kuykendall, Ralph S.; Howay, F. W.; Golder, Frank Alfred; Blue, George Verne; Hawaii; Captain Cook Sesquicentennial Commission (1930). The Hawaiian Islands. Early Relations with the Pacific Northwest, Judge F. W. Howay, F.R.S.C.; Russia and Russian Alaska, Dr. Frank A. Golder; French Kingdom, French Empire, French Republic, George Verne Blue. Papers Read During the Captain Cook Sesquicentennial Celebration, Honolulu, August 17, 1928. Hawaii (Ter.) Board of commissioners of public archives. Publication no. 5. Archives of Hawaii. Honolulu: Captain Cook Sesquicentennial Commission. OCLC 7932293.
- Taylor, Albert Pierce (September 30, 1930). "Historical Notes". Papers of the Hawaiian Historical Society (17). Honolulu: Printshop Company: 7–16. hdl:10524/961. OCLC 528867100.
- Taylor, Albert Pierce (1930). History of Iolani Palace. Honolulu. OCLC 6076719.
- Taylor, A. P. (January 14, 1923). "How Overthrow of Hawaiian Rule Thirty Years Ago Was Precipitated by a Pistol Shot". The Honolulu Advertiser. Honolulu.
- Taylor, Albert Pierce (1927). The Rulers of Hawaii, The Chiefs and Chiefesses, Their Palaces, Monuments, Portraits and Tombs. Honolulu: Advertiser Publishing Company. OCLC 9380797.
- Taylor, Albert Pierce (1929). Sesquicentennial Celebration of Captain Cook's Discovery of Hawaii (1778–1928) Held in the Hawaiian Islands, August 15 to 21, 1928. Hawaii (Ter.) Board of commissioners of public archives. Publication of the archives of Hawaii, no.4. Honolulu: Captain Cook Sesquicentennial Commission and the Archives of Hawaii Commission. OCLC 2553581.
- Taylor, Albert Pierce (1930). A Short History of the Hawaiian Islands. Honolulu. OCLC 16330567.
- Taylor, Albert Pierce (1922). Under Hawaiian Skies: A Narrative of the Romance, Adventure and History of the Hawaiian Islands. Honolulu: Advertiser Publishing Company, Ltd. OCLC 479709.
- Taylor, Albert Pierce (1926). Under Hawaiian Skies: A Narrative of the Romance, Adventure and History of the Hawaiian Islands, a Complete Historical Account. Honolulu: Advertiser Publishing Company, Ltd. OCLC 1547523.

== Bibliography ==
- Bouslog, Charles; Greig, Thelma (1994). Mānoa: the Story of a Valley. Honolulu: Mutual Publishing. ISBN 978-1-56647-067-4. OCLC 32599587.
- Kuykendall, Ralph Simpson (1931). "Albert Pierce Taylor". Thirty-Ninth Annual Report of the Hawaiian Historical Society for the Year 1930. Honolulu: Hawaiian Historical Society: 14. hdl:10524/89.
- Lam, Margaret M. (1932). Six Generations of Race Mixture in Hawaii. Honolulu: University of Hawaii, Sociology MA Thesis. OCLC 16325277.
- Peterson, Barbara Bennett (1984). Notable Women of Hawaii. Honolulu: University of Hawaii Press. ISBN 978-0-8248-0820-4. OCLC 11030010.
- Siddall, John William (1917). Men of Hawaii. Vol. 1. Honolulu. OCLC 16326675.
- Siddall, John William (1921). Men of Hawaii. Vol. 2. Honolulu. OCLC 16326675.
