= James J. Williams =

English-American photographer

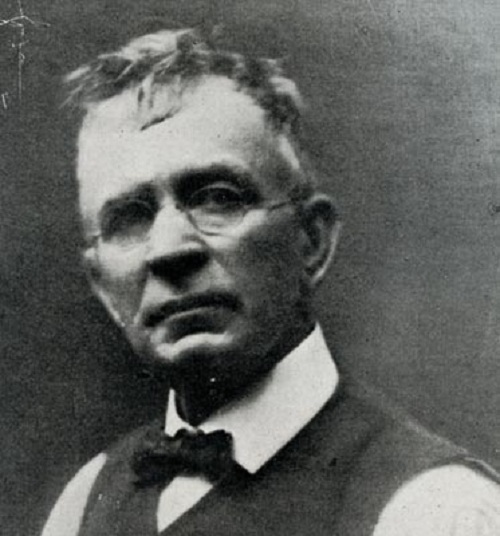
James J. Williams

James J. Williams (1853 – April 19, 1926) was an English-born photographer in the Kingdom of Hawaii. He worked for Menzies Dickson and then bought out Dickson's studio in 1882.

== Life ==
James J. Williams was born in England in 1853. At some point his family came to the United States, and he learned photography after the American Civil War. He passed through the Hawaiian Islands in 1879 from San Francisco where he worked for photographers I.W. Taber and Jacob Shew. He worked his way playing the violin on a ship to entertain passengers. In 1880 he returned to Honolulu and worked in the studio of Menzies Dickson (who lived about 1840–1891).

In February 1882 he bought Dickson's photography business and changed the name to J. Williams & Company. He published a booklet Tourists’ Guide for the Hawaiian Islands in 1882, and took pictures for other early guidebooks. The studio and gallery were at 102 and 104 Fort Street in Honolulu.

Williams advertised "the only gallery in Honolulu which has a complete collection of island views... Also, a supply of Hawaiian and South Sea Island curiosities, ferns, shells, &c.". He seems to have reestablished the business in 1883, since that is the year used in advertisements.

In 1888, during the reign of King Kalakaua, who was a frequent photographic subject of his, Williams founded the monthly tourist magazine Paradise of the Pacific with a royal charter from the king. He served as business manager with editor Frank Godfrey until 1893. Another popular portrait subject was Princess Kaʻiulani, and visitors such as Robert Louis Stevenson. He also took many landscape photos. Heavy equipment was often hauled up to erupting volcanoes Kilauea and Mauna Loa, and the Volcano House Hotel.

Williams died on April 19, 1926, after he was hit by a streetcar while crossing Hotel Street. He was buried in Oahu Cemetery.

== Legacy ==
His son James Anthony Williams was born in 1883 and worked at the Honolulu Advertiser in 1899. He married Minnie Lancaster on March 23, 1904. He later became the chief photographer of the newspaper.

Grandson Alex Williams (d. May 1988) continued the business, taking many photos of the industrial development of the city of Honolulu. His great-grandson Matt Williams owned the company in 2009. The Paradise of the Pacific evolved into Honolulu magazine, which claims to be the oldest magazine published in the US west of the Mississippi River.
