= Emma Taylor (engineer) =

UK safety engineer

Emma Taylor is a UK-based safety engineer. She is a Lead System Safety Engineer at the UK's RSSB (Rail Safety and Standards Board). Taylor is a Fellow of the Institution of Mechanical Engineers (IMechE), where she acts as a CPD (Professional development) auditor and Professional Registration Interviewer. She is a Chartered Engineer (UK), and a Fellow and Chair-Elect of the Safety and Reliability Society.

== Life ==
She attended the University of Aberdeen and received a MSC from their Safety Engineering program.

In the 2000s, she played a key role in the development of international standards for mitigation of orbiting space debris, representing UK industry at both European and international (ISO) level. During her 20 year career in the space industry, she also became a Fellow of the Royal Astronomical Society and published widely on space science and engineering research. She is an international lecturer on safety.

== Awards ==
In 2018 she was named one of The Telegraph and Women's Engineering Society's Top 50 Women in Engineering. She was nominated for Rail Safety Person of the Year in 2017. Taylor was nominated for the WISE Campaign Women in Industry Award 2018 in recognition of her 30 year engineering career in multiple sectors and her support of STEM professionals. In 2018 she was shortlisted as one of 2018's TechWomen100 and was a finalist in the 2018 Venus Awards.

In 2019 she was named one of the Top 100 Most Influential Women in Engineering by Inclusive Boards and the Financial Times.
