= List of diplomats from the United Kingdom to Hawaii =

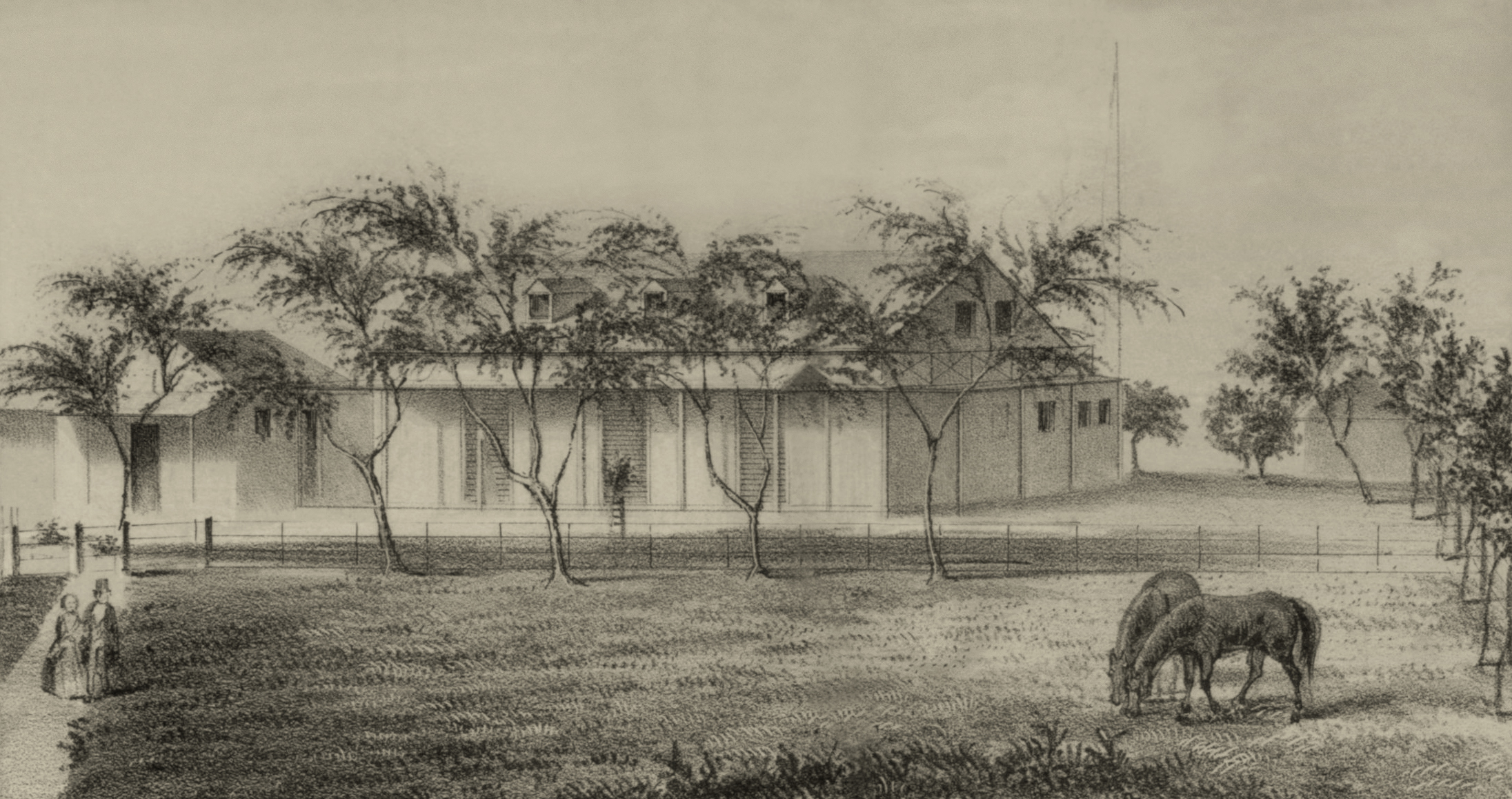
Residence of the British Consul in Honolulu in 1853.

Below is an incomplete List of Diplomats from the United Kingdom to Hawaii dealing with diplomatic representation in the Kingdom of Hawaii and its successor states the Provisional Government of Hawaii and the Republic of Hawaii before annexation to the United States in 1898.

== British ambassadors to Hawaii ==
- Richard Charlton, from 1824 to 1843
- Guillermo Miller, from 1844 to 1859
  - Robert Crichton Wyllie, 1844 to 1845, acting consul
  - Busvargus Toup Nicolas, 1859, acting consul
  - William Lowthian Green, acting consul
- William Webb Follett Synge, from 1862 to 1866
- James Hay Wodehouse (1824–1911), from 1866 to 1894
  - Theophilus Harris Davies, from 1872 to 1873, acting consul
- Albert George Sidney Hawes, from 1894 to 1897
- William Joseph Kenney (1859–), from 1897 to 1898
