= Emma Ahuena Taylor =

Public figure in Hawaii (1867–1937)

- Emma Ahuena Taylor
- Born: Emma Ahuena Davison; November 13, 1867; Honolulu, Kingdom of Hawaii
- Died: November 8, 1937 (aged 69); Honolulu, Territory of Hawaii
- Resting place: Oahu Cemetery
- Political party: Republican
- Spouse: Albert Pierce Taylor
- Mother: Mary Jane Kekulani Fayerweather
- Relatives: Rose C. Davison (sister); Julia Fayerweather Afong (aunt)

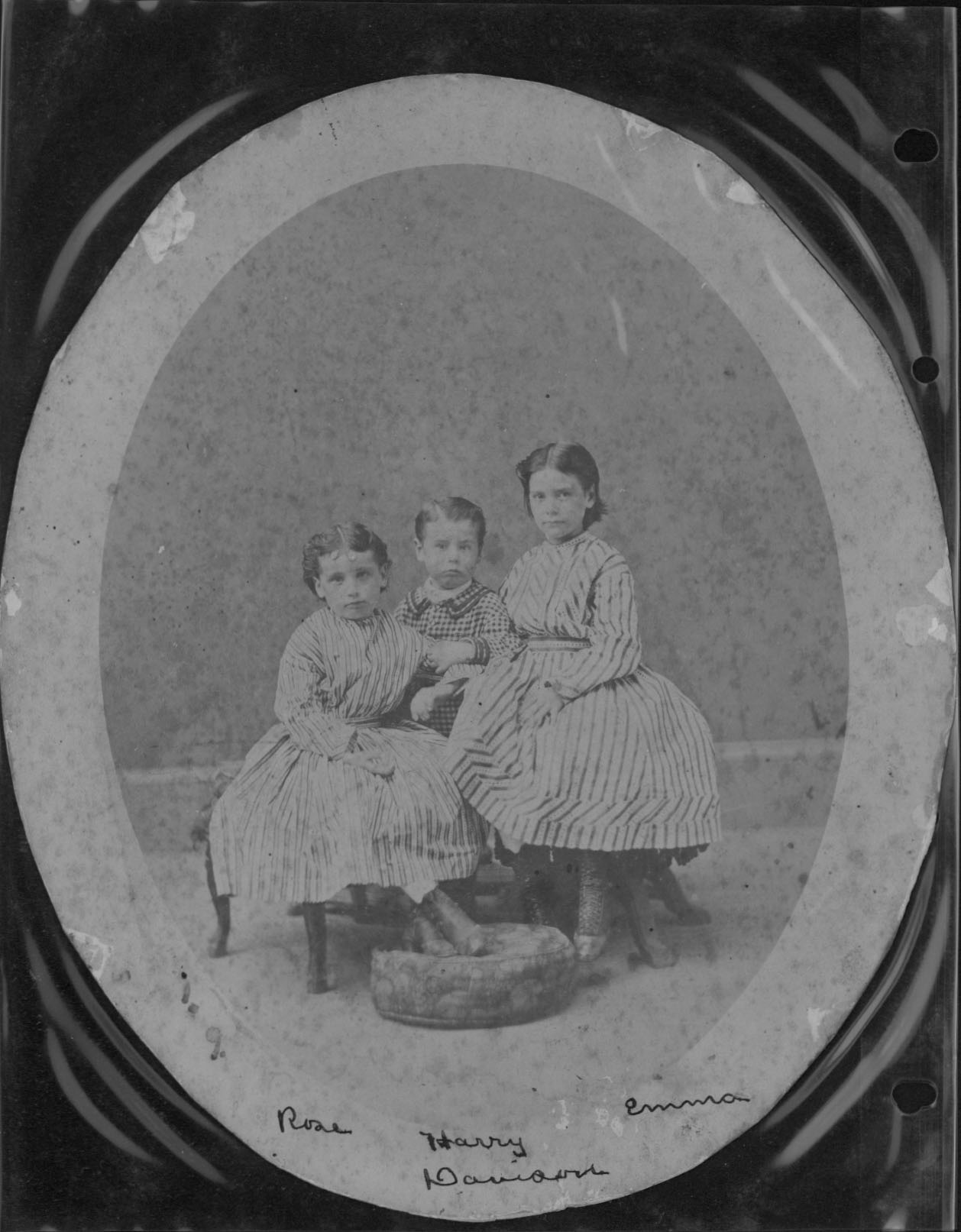
Emma (right) with her siblings: Rose and Harry, c. 1870s

Emma Ahuena Davison Taylor (November 13, 1867 – November 8, 1937) was a part-Native Hawaiian high chiefess during the 20th century. She was a cultural historian, a genealogist, and a repository of Hawaiian culture and history who wrote many articles and recollections about the past and influenced her husband, Albert Pierce Taylor, the author of the historical book Under Hawaiian Skies. She was involved in local philanthropic, historical, and civic groups and participated in the women's suffrage movement in the Territory of Hawaii, campaigning for the rights of local women to vote prior to the passage of the Nineteenth Amendment.

== Early life and family ==
Emma Ahuena Davison was born on November 13, 1867, although her gravestone says she was born in 1866. She was the eldest daughter and second child of American pharmacist Benoni Richmond Davison—who became the superintendent of the United States Marine Hospital in Honolulu—and American-British-Hawaiian chiefess Mary Jane Kekulani Fayerweather.

On her mother's side, she was a great-granddaughter of the British Captain George Charles Beckley and Ahia, a distant relation of the reigning House of Kamehameha. Davison's siblings included William Compton Malulani, Rose Compton, Henry Fayerweather, and Marie Hope Kekulani. Her father died in 1875 and her mother later married photographer A. A. Montano in 1877.

Davison attended St. Andrew's Priory School in Honolulu, where she was taught by the sisterhoods of the Anglican Church of Hawaii established by King Kamehameha IV and Queen Emma. She later transferred to Fort Street School and became a playmate of Princess Kaʻiulani, the niece of King Kalākaua. Beginning in 1890, after finishing her education, she worked as a schoolteacher with her sister Rose at the government school in the Mānoa Valley.

She married Albert Pierce Taylor on November 5, 1902, at her mother's Mānoa residence, becoming Taylor's second wife. Taylor, originally from the United States, settled in Hawaii and worked for The Pacific Commercial Advertiser and later became the librarian for the Archives of Hawaii. He was also a writer of Hawaiian history whose most notable work is Under Hawaiian Skies. They had no children.

== Literary career ==
Emma Ahuena Taylor was an authority on Hawaiian history, genealogy, and language. With her mother, she planned and directed many historical pageants. Her husband's later works were greatly influenced by Taylor and her mother. In the 1920s, Taylor received a government appointment to the Hawaiian Historical and Hawaiian Folklore Commissions. The trustees of Bishop Museum and Kamehameha Schools consulted her and other Hawaiian scholars in the translation of Samuel Kamakau's seminal work Ruling Chiefs of Hawaii into English.

Taylor and her husband became officers in the Hawaiian Historical Society. In September 1930, she wrote a paper and used it to address the society's annual meeting about the history and origin of the former Royal Tombs at Pohukaina. Located in the grounds of ʻIolani Palace, the site was abandoned when the bodies of the Hawaiian royal family were moved to the Royal Mausoleum at Mauna ʻAla during the reign of Kamehameha V, leaving behind many remains of the chiefs. Because of its importance Taylor argued; "...the site of the old royal tomb should be held in veneration, and that the historic mound should be cleared and exposed to public view, surrounded by an imposing guard fence, and an appropriate tablet set up to tell passersby its profound royal history". Following this meeting, the society submitted a resolution asking Governor Walter F. Frear to put a protective fence and plaque around the sacred site, which was done on October 17, 1930. Her other scholarly publications include; "Vengeance of Pele" (1930), the "Legend of Puahuula" (1930), and "Poki — Guardian Dog of Moanalua" (1935), all of which were written for Paradise of the Pacific magazine.

The most notable characteristics of Taylor's writings were its personal touches and romantic depictions of the past, containing many vivid accounts drawn from her own life. In 1935, she wrote a series of eight weekly installments titled "Personal Recollections", in which she recounts life in Hawaii from her childhood in the 1870s until 1934, for the Honolulu Star-Bulletin. Eleanor H. Williamson notes:

Her writing was personal, vivid, and poignant as she described the elegance of court life, with its picturesque and majestic emblems of royalty in the stately kahilis and feather capes, and the genteel and dignified manner of the men and women surrounding the monarch. She was a repository of information on old Hawaii and was liberal in sharing it. In her recollections she provided the color, drama, and personal stories so often absent from purely factual histories. One can almost taste the dust, smell the leis, and view old Honolulu in the mind's eye as she wrote...

== Community involvement ==
Emma Ahuena Taylor wearing an ʻahu ʻula as the premier of Māmakakaua at the funeral of Jonah Kūhiō Kalanianaʻole, 1922

In 1912, she became a supporter of the women's suffrage movement. Native Hawaiian women of high societal rank like Taylor were key early campaigners for this cause. In 1917, she attended a party hosted by Emma Nakuina to honor a visiting suffragist from the mainland United States, Almira Hollander Pitman, the wife of Taylor's cousin Benjamin F. Pitman. The presence of Taylor and other upper-class Honolulu suffragists—including Wilhelmine Widemann Dowsett, president of the National Women's Equal Suffrage Association of Hawaii—and subsequent meetings with the club prompted Pitman to write to her political connections in the mainland, which helped push a bill authorizing the Territory of Hawaii with the power to legislate on the issue of women's suffrage through Congress. In 1919, a local bill to enfranchise the women of Hawaii was planned but it never passed because the following year Congress passed the Nineteenth Amendment, granting all women in the United States the right to vote. During World War I, Taylor and her friend Emilie Widemann Macfarlane organized knitting units on behalf of Native Hawaiian soldiers.

On September 23, 1921, Taylor wrote an article published in the Honolulu Advertiser that argued for Hawaii's recognition in a proposed Hall of Remembrance to be erected by the Woman's National Foundation in Washington, DC, honoring women from each of the then-forty-eight states. Speaking on behalf of the women of Hawaii, she advocated for Hawaii's spot in the proposed memorial, suggesting "a pillar of laval stone chiselled from the laval flows of Kilauea, be placed within this Hall of Remembrance to symbolize Hawaii" and for the recognition of the early pioneering American missionary wives, Queen Kaʻahumanu and High Chiefess Kapiʻolani. The pillar representing Hawaii was never erected.

Taylor also supported many local organizations and was the premier of Māmakakaua (the Daughters and Sons of Hawaiian Warriors), a group composed of the descendants of the high chiefs (aliʻi) from the deposed monarchy. The group hosted pageants celebrating the history and traditions of Hawaii. Other organizations she became involved include the League of Women Voters, The Outdoor Circle, and the Native Daughters of Hawaii—which she helped organized. She was also elected the first female vice-president of the Manoa Percent Republican Club.

In later life, Taylor befriended writer Beatrice Ayer Patton—the wife of General George S. Patton—who wrote The Blood of the Shark: A Romance of Early Hawaii, which was published in 1936 and loosely influenced by the exploits of Taylor's Hawaiian and British ancestors.

== Death ==
Richard Weinberg described her in a 1936 interview about the art and craft of Ancient Hawaii in the Honolulu Star-Bulletin: "Mrs. Emma Ahuena Taylor impresses one as a person who has carried a strikingly handsome, youthful appearance into maturity. Although her hair is gray and her old fashioned, black holoku sweeps the floor, her limpid brown eyes retain all the charm and fire of youth. Her carefully modulated voice recalls a day when conversation was not a neglected art."

Taylor died on November 7, 1937, and was buried next to her husband at the Oahu Cemetery. Her private notes, diaries, letters, and manuscript drafts, and those of her mother Mary Jane Montano, are now in the Hawaii State Archives.

== Bibliography ==
- Bouslog, Charles; Greig, Thelma (1994). Mānoa: the Story of a Valley. Honolulu: Mutual Publishing. ISBN 978-1-56647-067-4. OCLC 32599587.
- Dye, Bob (1997). Merchant Prince of the Sandalwood Mountains: Afong and the Chinese in Hawaiʻi. Honolulu: University of Hawaii Press. ISBN 978-0-8248-1772-5. OCLC 247424976.
- Damon, Ethel Moseley (1957). Sanford Ballard Dole and His Hawaii: With an Analysis of Justice Dole's Legal Opinions. Honolulu: Hawaiian Historical Society. OCLC 16335969. Archived from the original on December 22, 2017 – via Questia.
- Harper, Ida Husted, ed. (1922). History of Woman Suffrage: 1900–1920. Vol. VI. New York: National American Woman Suffrage Association. OCLC 10703030.
- Lam, Margaret M. (1932). Six Generations of Race Mixture in Hawaii. Honolulu: University of Hawaii, Sociology MA Thesis. OCLC 16325277.
- Peterson, Barbara Bennett, ed. (1984). Notable Women of Hawaii. Honolulu: University of Hawaii Press. ISBN 978-0-8248-0820-4. OCLC 11030010.
- Taylor, Emma Ahuena Davison (September 1930). "The Burial Caves of Pahukaina". Papers of the Hawaiian Historical Society (17). Honolulu: The Bulletin Publishing Company: 34–38. hdl:10524/967. OCLC 1773152.
- Totten, Ruth Ellen Patton (2005). Totten, James Patton (ed.). The Button Box: A Daughter's Loving Memoir of Mrs. George S. Patton. Columbia: University of Missouri Press. ISBN 978-0-8262-6465-7. OCLC 191953251.
- Yasutake, Rumi (2017). "Re-Franchising Women of Hawaiʻi, 1912–1920: Politics of Gender, Sovereignty, Race, and Rank at the Crossroads of the Pacific". In Choy, Catherine Ceniza; Wu, Judy Tzu-Chun (eds.). Gendering the Trans-Pacific World. Leiden: Brill. ISBN 978-90-04-33610-0. OCLC 976394366.
