= Maria Ogden =

American teacher and missionary to Hawaii

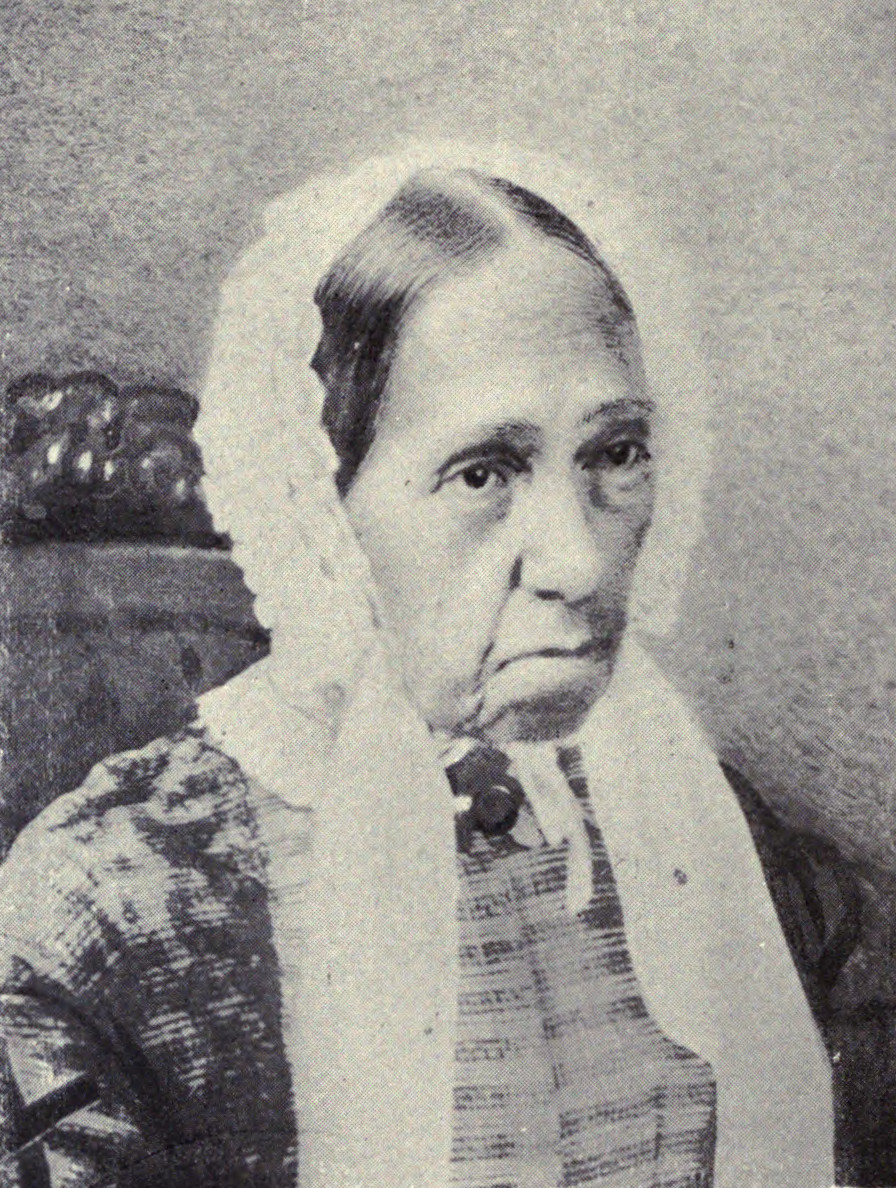
- Maria Ogden (circa 1870)
- Born: February 17, 1792; Philadelphia, Pennsylvania, United States
- Died: April 13, 1874 (aged 82); Honolulu, Kingdom of Hawaii
- Occupations: Teacher, missionary, tract distributor

Maria Ogden (1792 – 1874) was an teacher and missionary to Hawaii.

Born in Philadelphia on February 17, 1792, as an only child, in 1827, she took part in the third wave of missionaries to Hawaii, arriving there on March 30 the next year. She initially nursed sick Hawaiians, however, beginning in 1838, she was a teacher in a school for Hawaiian girls. After it was shut down sometime in the 1850s, she created a small private school in Wailuku. Due to her old age, in 1868, she retired from teaching, becoming a tract distributor and hospital visitor in Honolulu. She died there on April 3, 1874, as she sustained lethal injuries due to a fall, saying "take me home" as her last words.

She never married, but raised four adoptive daughters. Two of these were Hawaiian while another two were adopted in 1853.
