= Na Lani ʻEhā =

Siblings of the royal family of Hawaii

Na Lani ʻEhā, translated as The Four Royals or The Heavenly Four, refers to the siblings King Kalākaua (1836–1891), Queen Liliʻuokalani (1838–1917), Princess Likelike (1851–1887) and Prince William Pitt Leleiohoku II (1854–1877). All four were composers, known for their patronage and enrichment of Hawaii's musical culture and history. All four of them organized glee clubs. William Pitt Leleiohoku II, the youngest brother who died at age 22, was a guitar master and leader of the Kawaihau Glee Club. Youngest sister Likelike was a musician and a co-founder of the Kaohuokalani Singing Club.

Queen Liliʻuokalani and King Kalākaua were the eldest siblings and had the most profound impact on Hawaii's culture. Both mentored numerous individuals, some of whom went on to musical careers in their own rights. Kalākaua did the most to revive Hawaiian culture when as monarch he showcased native Hawaiian music and traditional hula at his coronation and birthday jubilee celebrations, kickstarting the first Hawaiian Renaissance. Prior to his actions, those two mainstays of Hawaiian culture had been pushed into the shadows for decades by the Protestant Christian missionaries. He was the founder of Kalākaua's Singing Boys glee club, as well as Hui Lei Mamo glee club which featured many hula dancers. After her ascension to the throne upon her brother's death in 1891, Liliʻuokalani sent Hui Lei Mamo on a tour throughout the United States and Europe. She was the most prolific songwriter of the siblings, and both she and Kalākaua collaborated with Royal Hawaiian bandmaster Henri Berger.

The Royal Four's aggregate body of musical compositions in the Hawaiian language numbers in the hundreds. The Hawaiian Music Hall of Fame, formed in 1994, acknowledges the royal siblings as their patrons, recognizing their roles as the progenitors of Hawaii's music and arts culture that the world identifies with today.

== Terminology ==
Na Lani ʻEhā translates as The Royal Four or The Heavenly Four. In the Hawaiian language, na is a plural form of "the", lani means "heaven" or "royal", while ʻEhā is "four". In traditional Hawaiian culture, the aliʻi (chiefs or royals) class were poetically referred to as lani or "Heavenly Ones". Prior to the advent of Christianity in the kingdom, the highest-ranking aliʻi were worshiped as akua or gods. They were considered sacred individuals, who governed with divine power mana, which was derived from the spiritual energy of their ancestors.

The collective name predates the Hawaiian Music Hall of Fame's acknowledgement in 1994. Na Lani ʻEhā was the name of an early 20th-century composition by Mekia Kealakaʻi, although it was not about the royal siblings. During the 1958 celebration of Aloha Week, a historical pageant on Kauai titled Na Lani ʻEhā was featured, honoring the composition of the four royal composers.

== Na Lani ʻEhā ==
Name	Image	Birth–Death	Notes	Ref(s)
Kalākaua		(1836–1891)	Lyricist for the national anthem and state song "Hawaiʻi Ponoʻī" (Hawaii's Own), honoring Kamehameha I (Henri Berger wrote the music). The last reigning king of the Hawaiian Kingdom. Helped restore the hula. The Merrie Monarch Festival is named in his honor.	
Liliʻuokalani		(1838–1917)	Last reigning monarch of Hawaiian Kingdom. Composed "Aloha 'Oe" and hundreds of other songs and chants. See also: List of compositions and works by Liliʻuokalani.	
Likelike		(1851–1887)	Princess of the Hawaiian Kingdom, mother of Princess Ka'iulani. Composer and sponsor of musical events.	
Leleiohoku II		(1854–1877)	Prince and Heir Apparent of the Hawaiian Kingdom. See also: List of compositions by Leleiohoku II.	

== Revival of the Hawaiian hula ==
The arrival of Christian missionaries in the early 19th century altered the cultural landscape of the kingdom. The hula was viewed by them as evil and corrupt, and it was eventually banned from public performances by Queen consort Ka'ahumanu. Nevertheless, the hula continued to be practiced in private settings. The Royal Four siblings were raised in the Protestant Christian faith, but saw the hula as part of their cultural heritage. One of the leading critics of the Kalākaua era was Presbyterian minister Sereno E. Bishop, who often incorporated his revulsion of the "bestialities of the hula hula" into his sermons. He took particular offense at Liliʻuokalani's adherence to her culture.

It was ultimately Kalākaua who dropped the pretense and showcased large public hula performances and the oli (chants). During the king's 1883 coronation, local chanter and hula master ʻIoane ʻŪkēkē, aka Dandy Ioane, danced with hula girls, before an estimated 5,000 lūʻau guests. "Dandy" was an apt name for Ioane, who specially tailored his own clothing in a style that led one newspaper to call him "Honolulu's Beau Brummell". The hula that was choreographed for the coronation blended the traditional style with the more modern steps, with a printed program provided to the public. Legislator William Richards Castle filed a lawsuit against the printer on grounds of obscenity.

The king also celebrated Hawaiian culture at his two-week 50th birthday Jubilee in 1886. The celebration began with a parade featuring the hula, and floats representing stories from native Hawaiian culture. Hula was again performed at the evening lūʻau gala celebration, continuing through the night until the dawn of the next day. Unlike the reactions to the hula performances at the coronation, very little was reported in the media about the Jubilee hulas. Kalākaua's reign is generally regarded as the first Hawaiian Renaissance, for both his influence on Hawaii's music, and for other contributions he made to reinvigorate Hawaiian culture. His actions inspired the reawakening of Hawaiian pride and nationalism.

== Royal glee clubs ==
=== Kalākaua's Singing Boys ===
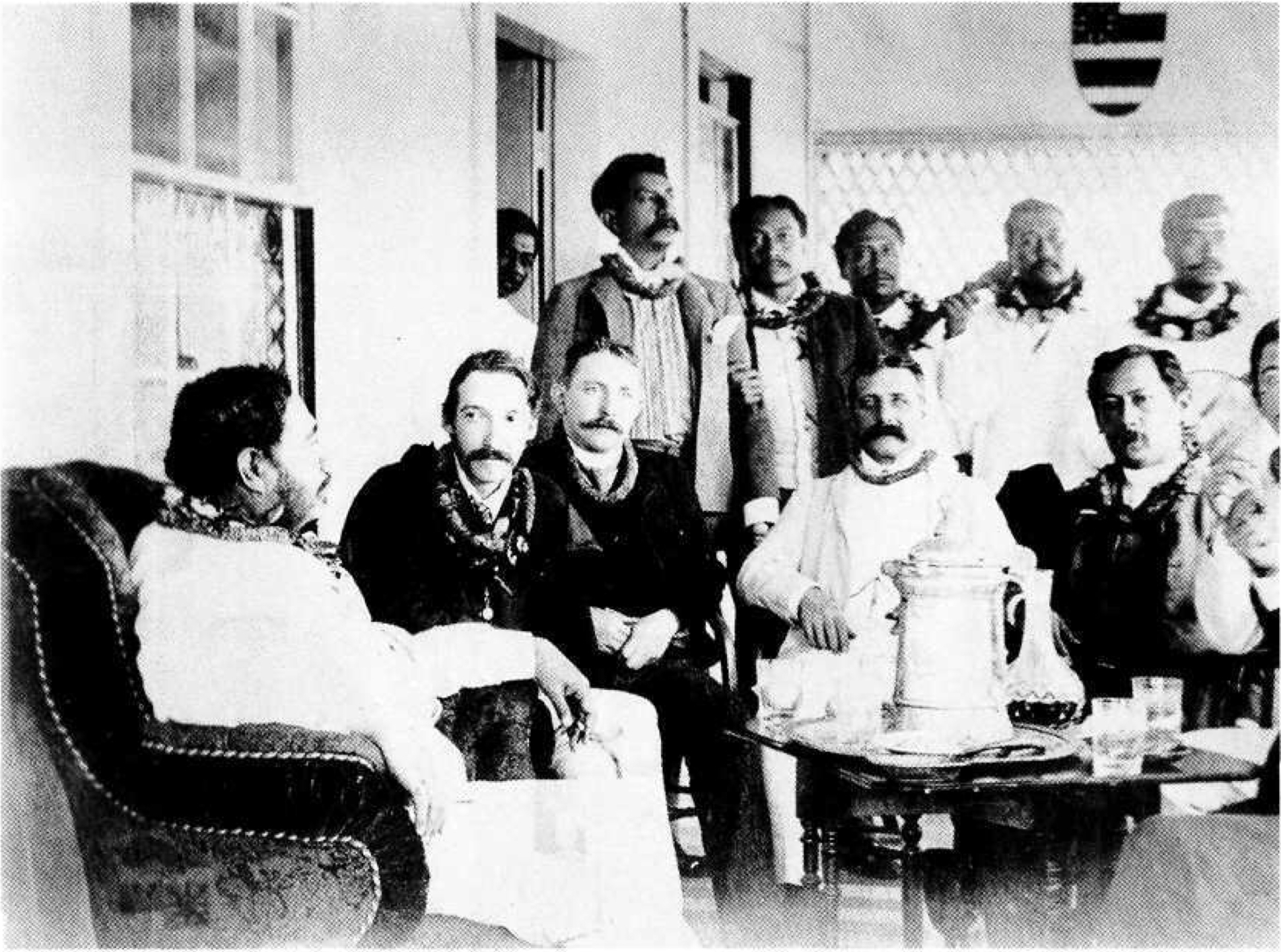
King Kalākaua, Scottish writer Robert Louis Stevenson, and "Kalākaua's Singing Boys", his own personally headed choir, c. 1889

The choral group formed by the king was named Kalākaua's Singing Boys (aka King's Singing Boys). It was a minstrel troupe composed of native Hawaiian male musicians. According to Hawaii resident Isobel Osbourne Strong, wife of artist Joseph Dwight Strong and stepdaughter of Robert Louis Stevenson, Kalākaua would often play the ukulele and perform mele (songs) for his visitors, accompanied by the Singing Boys. They would often entertain at Healani, the King's Boathouse. Strong recalled the Singing Boys as "the best singers and performers on the ukulele and guitar in the whole islands".

The Singing Boys remained active after Kalākaua's 1891 death. In 1893, American journalist Mary Hannah Krout mentioned attending a performance by Kalākaua's Singing Boys. Krout, who was in Hawaii shortly after the overthrow of the monarchy, noted: "Their contribution was a song in Hawaiian, written for the occasion, in which the missionaries and Provisional Government were soundly rated."

=== Kawaihau Glee Club ===
We used to go out of evenings with a new song the Prince had composed and make the rounds. First on King Kalakaua at Iolani Palace; then to Washington Place to serenade Princess Liliuokalani, and even as far as Ainahau, the Waikiki residence of Princess Likelike. Reaching home again at "Kaakopua" on Emma Street, where the Prince made his residence with his Mother by adoption, Princess Ruth Keelikolani, half sister of the Fourth and Fifth Kamehamehas, in the "wee small hours of the morning". Happy days those were; the days when "Wine, Women and Song" were the rule of the day.

— Curtis P. Iaukea
Kawaihau Glee Club member

Leleiohoku founded several royal choral societies, including the 1876 Kawaihau Glee Club composed of 15 members. They were alternately known as the Kawaihau Serenaders. Until Leleiohoku's death at age 22 in 1877, his groups would compete with the singing troupes organized by his sisters Liliʻuokalani and Likelike. In later life, Liliʻuokalani admitted that "those of Prince Leleiohoku were really in advance of those of his two sisters, although perhaps this was due to the fact that the singing-club of the regent was far superior to any that we could organize; it consisted in a large degree of the very purest and sweetest male voices to be found amongst the native Hawaiians." The name of the glee club was later used for a separate Hui Kawaihau, a business group founded by King Kalākaua and his favorites which was involved in sugar cultivation near Kapaʻa in eastern Kauai.

The song "Hawaiian War Chant", popularized in the early 20th century by various artists, had its beginnings in "Kāua I Ka Huahuaʻi" (We Two in the Spray), a love song penned by Leleiohoku. The only similarity between the two songs is the melody, which was lifted from Leleiohoku's original stylings. He was an accomplished musician, considered a virtuoso on the guitar.

=== Kaohuokalani Singing Club ===
The group founded by Liliʻuokalani and Likelike was known as the "Hui Himeni Kaohuokalani", (Note: The word hui in these organizational names is the Hawaiian word for a social or community group.) usually translated as the Kaohuokalani Singing Club or Kaohuokalani Singing Association. One member of the group was Kapoli Kamakau who co-composed songs with the two royal sisters, but later died of leprosy at the leper colony of Kalaupapa. The organization composed a number of kanikau (dirges) for the funeral of Princess Likelike in 1887, including songs by Liliʻuokalani, Kamakau and Eliza Wood Holt.

=== Hui Lei Mamo ===
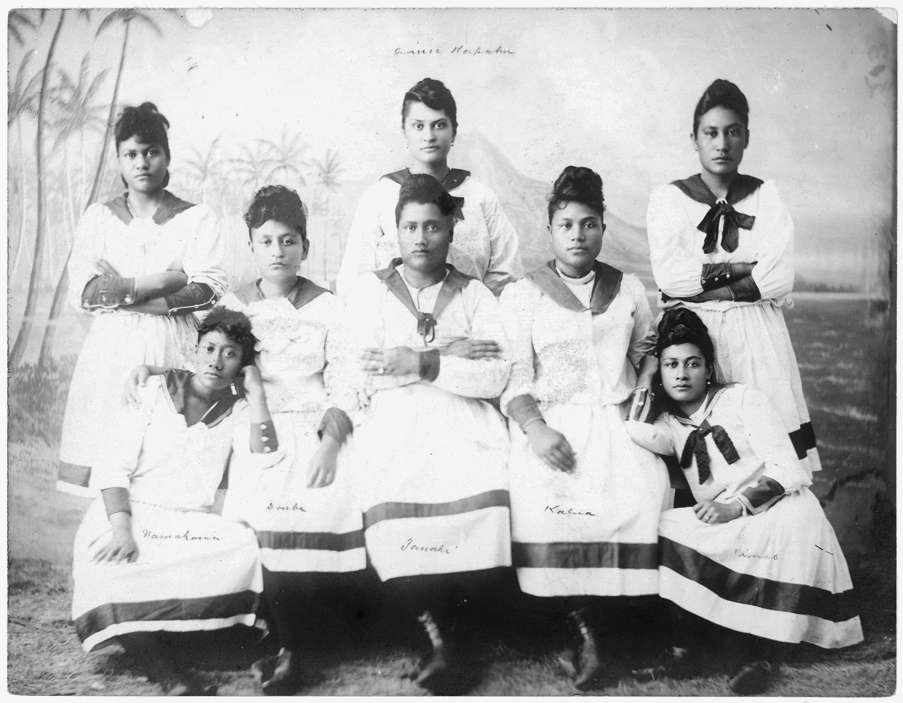
Kini Kapahu (standing center) with other members of Queen Liliuokalani's Hui Lei Mamo Singing Girls, 1894

Kalākaua created the Hui Lei Mamo in 1886 as a glee club composed of eight young female native Hawaiian hula dancers and singers. They received extensive training, and entertained at private performances for the king and his guests, as they did the day Robert Louis Stevenson and friends visited the king at his boathouse. The star performer in the group was 14-year-old Kini Kapahu. Upon the king's death in 1891, Liliʻuokalani retained the glee club, and sponsored them on an extended tour through the United States and Europe. In 1908, Kapahu married future Honolulu mayor John H. Wilson.

== Mentorship and collaborators ==
Henri Berger (1844–1929), conductor of Germany's military band, was loaned to Hawaii by Kaiser Wilhelm I during the reign of Kamehameha V in 1872. Just as Na Lani ʻEhā nurtured local talent, so Berger mentored the four royal siblings. He wrote the music for Kalākaua's lyrical tribute to Kamehameha I. The song later became Hawaii's anthem and state song "Hawaiʻi Ponoʻī" (Hawaii's Own). Kalākaua appointed him as head of the Royal Hawaiian Band, a position he held for 43 years. He formed a close collaboration with Liliʻuokalani, and wrote the music to many of her songs. Berger became a historian for traditional Hawaiian music of his day.

Many of the courtly retainers or ladies-in-waiting to Likelike and Lili'uokalani were composers in their own rights. Elizabeth Keawepoʻoʻole Sumner, lady-in-waiting to Likelike, co-composed with Lili'uokalani the love song "Sanoe" about a secret love affair in the Hawaiian royal court. "Liko Pua Lehua" (Tender Leaves of the Lehua Flower) and other songs were co-composed by Kapoli Kamakau, Likelike and Lili'uokalani when Kamakau was a member of their glee club. Kamakau was a lady-in-waiting to Liliʻuokalani. Eveline Townsend Wilson, a protégé and lady-in-waiting to Lili'uokalani, first caught the attention of the future queen while singing in the Kawaiahaʻo Church choir led by Lili'uokalani. She accompanied the queen during imprisonment at ʻIolani Palace. Honolulu mayor John H. Wilson was her son. Rose Tribe was handmaiden and musical protégée to Liliʻuokalani and traveled with her retinue. She was a soprano soloist who, after the queen's death, accompanied herself on the ukulele, appearing on radio shows and on stage. Tribe gained a reputation as "the soprano with the million dollar smile".

One of Hawaii's most renowned composers, Charles E. King, was a musical protégé of Liliʻuokalani and had his own King Glee Club. He was the publisher of three song books and the composer of "Kamehameha Waltz ", a tribute to his alma mater Kamehameha School for Boys. "Ke Kali Nei Au" (Waiting For Thee), is known to today's audiences as the "Hawaiian Wedding Song", popular with the tourist trade after the lyrics were adapted for a wider audience. King's original lyrics were not that of a wedding song, but rather one of several tunes written for his Hawaiian-language opera The Prince of Hawaii. At its premiere on May 4, 1925, Ray Kinney starred in the lead of Prince Kauikalu, with Rose Tribe as Queen Kamaka, and Joseph Kamakau as King Kalani.

Entertainer and songwriter Bina Mossman was singing on the streets with her glee club in 1914, when Liliʻuokalani took them under her tutelage. At the former queen's residence of Washington Place, they were trained in Hawaiian diction, and immersed in older Hawaiian songs. Upon Liliʻuokalani's 1917 death, the glee club was chosen as kahili bearers to stand watch over her body, and sing her compositions. Mossman's glee club lasted for 28 years. She later formed the Ka`ahumanu Choral Group of older women, with whom she toured the world.

== Legacy ==
The siblings' aggregate body of musical compositions in the Hawaiian language numbers in the hundreds. According to the Smithsonian Institution's museum curator John Troutman, music composed by the Na Lani ʻEhā, "became wildly popular" during their lifetimes, published in the media of its day, and performed by numerous groups throughout the kingdom.

The Hawaiian Music Hall of Fame, formed in 1994, acknowledges the royal siblings as their patrons, stating that the Royal Four were the progenitors of the music and arts culture that Hawaii has come to be known for. In 2007, the Hawaiian Music Hall of Fame released an album, titled Na Lani ʻEhā, featuring renditions of the works of the four royal composers performed by Ku'uipo Kumukahi and the Hawaiian Music Hall of Fame Serenaders.

== See also ==
- House of Kalākaua
- Bibliography of Kalākaua
- Bibliography of Liliʻuokalani
- List of compositions and works by Likelike
- List of compositions and works by Leleiohoku II

== Bibliography ==
- Allen, Helena G. (1982). The Betrayal of Liliuokalani: Last Queen of Hawaii, 1838–1917. Glendale, CA: Arthur H. Clark Company. ISBN 978-0-87062-144-4. OCLC 9576325. Archived from the original on January 13, 2018.
- Allen, Helena G. (1995). Kalakaua: Renaissance King. Honolulu: Mutual Publishing. ISBN 978-1-56647-059-9. OCLC 35083815. Archived from the original on December 21, 2019.
- Carr, James Revell (2014). Hawaiian Music in Motion: Mariners, Missionaries, and Minstrels. University of Illinois Press. ISBN 978-0-252-09652-5. Archived from the original on February 23, 2020.
- Cunha, A. R. (1914). Famous Hawaiian Songs. Translated by W. H. Coney and Solomon Meheula. Honolulu: Bergstrom Music. OCLC 13403547.
- Dole, Charles S. (October 15, 1929). "The Hui Kawaihau". Papers of the Hawaiian Historical Society. 16. Honolulu: Hawaiian Historical Society: 8–15. hdl:10524/978. OCLC 528831753.
- Forbes, David W., ed. (2003). Hawaiian National Bibliography, 1780–1900, Volume 4: 1881–1900. Vol. 4. Honolulu: University of Hawaii Press. ISBN 978-0-8248-2636-9. OCLC 123279964. Archived from the original on May 1, 2016.
- Iaukea, Curtis Piehu; Watson, Lorna Kahilipuaokalani Iaukea (1988). Schweizer, Niklaus R. (ed.). By Royal Command: The Official Life and Personal Reminiscences of Colonel Curtis Piehu Iaukea at the Court of Hawaii's Rulers. Honolulu: Hui Hanai. ISBN 978-0-9616738-6-4. OCLC 16006083. Archived from the original on February 16, 2017.
- Imada, Adria L. (2012). Aloha America: Hula Circuits Through the U.S. Empire. Durham, NC: Duke University Press. ISBN 978-0-8223-9516-4. OCLC 806017785.
- Iaukea, Sydney L. (2011). The Queen and I: A Story of Dispossessions and Reconnections in Hawaiʻi. University of California Press. ISBN 978-0-520-95030-6. OCLC 860626992. Archived from the original on January 29, 2020.
- Kanahele, George S. (1979). Hawaiian Music and Musicians: An Illustrated History. University Press of Hawaii. ISBN 978-0-8248-0578-4. OCLC 903648649.
- Krauss, Bob (1994). Johnny Wilson: First Hawaiian Democrat. Honolulu: University of Hawaii Press. ISBN 978-0-8248-1577-6. OCLC 30398759.
- Koskinen, Aarne A. (1960). "Ariki, The First-Born: An Analysis of a Polynesian Chieftain Title". FF Communications. LXXIV (181). Helsinki: Academia Scientiarum Fennica. ISBN 978-951-41-0003-1. OCLC 247037581.
- Krout, Mary Hannah (1898). Hawaii and a Revolution: The Personal Experiences of a Correspondent in the Sandwich Islands During the Crisis of 1893 and Subsequently. New York: Dodd, Mead and Company. ASIN B0011VJARG. OCLC 2012741.
- Kuykendall, Ralph Simpson (1967). The Hawaiian Kingdom 1874–1893, The Kalakaua Dynasty. Vol. 3. Honolulu: University of Hawaii Press. ISBN 978-0-87022-433-1. OCLC 500374815. Archived from the original on January 20, 2015.
- Law, Anwei Skinsnes (2012). Kalaupapa: A Collective Memory (Ka Hokuwelowelo). Honolulu: University of Hawaii Press. ISBN 978-0-8248-6580-1. OCLC 830023588. Archived from the original on October 26, 2016 – via Project MUSE.
- Liliuokalani (1898). Hawaii's Story by Hawaii's Queen, Liliuokalani. Boston: Lee and Shepard. ISBN 978-0-548-22265-2. OCLC 2387226.
- Mossman (1979). "Bina Nieper Mossman: Transcript of interview conducted Sept. 29, 1971 in Hawaii". Honolulu: Watumull Foundation Oral History Project. hdl:10524/48627.
- Pukui, Mary Kawena; Elbert, Samuel H. (1986). Hawaiian Dictionary: Hawaiian-English, English-Hawaiian. Honolulu: University of Hawaii Press. ISBN 978-0-8248-0703-0. OCLC 1005492788. Archived from the original on January 1, 2015.
- Proto, Neil Thomas (2009). The Rights of My People: Liliuokalani's Enduring Battle with the United States, 1893–1917. New York, NY: Algora Publishing. ISBN 978-0-87586-720-5.
- Schweizer, Niklaus Rudolf (1999). Turning Tide: The Ebb and Flow of Hawaiian Nationality. Berne, NY: Peter Lang. ISBN 978-3-906762-00-5. OCLC 41445703.
- Sahlins, Marshall (1996). How "Natives" Think: About Captain Cook, For Example. Chicago: University of Chicago Press. ISBN 978-0-226-73369-2. OCLC 1016115445. Archived from the original on November 19, 2018.
- Silva, Noenoe K. (2004). "The Merrie Monarch: Genealogy, cosmology, mele, and performance art as resistance". In Joseph, Gilbert M.; Rosenberg, Emily S. (eds.). Aloha Betrayed: Native Hawaiian Resistance to American Colonialism. Durham: Duke University Press. ISBN 0-8223-8622-4. OCLC 191222123.
- Taylor, Clarice B. (1954). Holt, Lisa Ululani (ed.). The Fabulous Holts. Honolulu. Archived from the original on December 8, 2016.
- Topolinski, John Renken Kahaʻi (January 1976). "Musical Diggings – Na Mele Ohana (Family Songs)". Haʻilono Mele. II (1). Honolulu: The Hawaiian Music Foundation: 3–8.
- Topolinski, John Renken Kahaʻi (February 1976). "Musical Diggings – The Sumner Family, A Legacy of Family Mele and Chants". Haʻilono Mele. II (2). Honolulu: The Hawaiian Music Foundation: 2–6.
- Topolinski, John Renken Kahaʻi (March 1976). "Musical Diggings – The Sumner Family". Haʻilono Mele. II (3). Honolulu: The Hawaiian Music Foundation: 3–8.
- Topolinski, John Renken Kahaʻi (1981). "Nancy Sumner, Hawaiian Courtlady". Hawaiian Journal of History. 15. Honolulu: Hawaiian Historical Society: 50–58. hdl:10524/285.
- Tranquada, Jim; King, John (2003). "New History of the Origins and Development of the ʻUkulele, 1838–1915" (PDF). The Hawaiian Journal of History. 37. Honolulu: Hawaiian Historical Society: 1–32. hdl:10524/382. OCLC 60626541. Archived from the original (PDF) on October 20, 2022.
- Tranquada, Jim; King, John (2012). The ʻUkulele: A History. Honolulu: University of Hawaii Press. ISBN 978-0-8248-3544-6. OCLC 767806914. Archived from the original on March 5, 2017 – via Project MUSE.
- Troutman, John W. (2016). Kīkā Kila: How the Hawaiian Steel Guitar Changed the Sound of Modern Music. The University of North Carolina Press. ISBN 978-1-4696-2794-6. OCLC 939963156. Archived from the original on February 2, 2020.
- Vowell, Sarah (2011). Unfamiliar Fishes. Riverhead Books. ISBN 978-1-101-48645-0. OCLC 646111859.
- Zambucka, Kristin (2002). Kalakaua: Hawaiʻi's Last King. Honolulu: Māna Publishing Company. ISBN 978-0-931897-04-7. OCLC 123305738. Archived from the original on July 17, 2014.
