= List of compositions by Likelike =

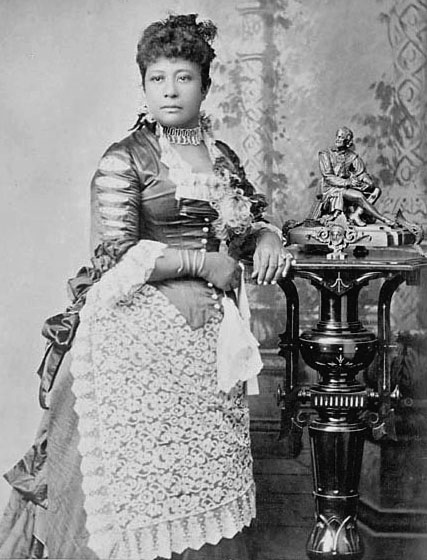
Princess Likelike

Princess Likelike and her siblings King David Kalākaua, Queen Liliʻuokalani, and Crown Prince Leleiohoku II, were known as the Nā Lani ʻEhā (The Royal Four): aliʻi who were renowned as composers and champions of Hawaiian music in the latter half of the 19th century. With Likelike's siblings, she led one of the three royal music clubs that held regular friendly competitions to outdo each other in song and poetry while she was alive. "ʻĀinahau", the most famed of Likelike's works, was composed about the Cleghorn residence in Waikiki, the gathering place for Sunday afternoon musical get-togethers where she wrote most of her compositions. She encouraged the musical education of her daughter, Princess Kaʻiulani, and sponsored concerts and musical pageants. The patronage she gave to young musicians and composers helped perpetuate Hawaiian music.

== ʻĀinahau ==
ʻĀinahau, one of the homes of the Oʻahu chiefs, was part of the 10-acre (40,000 m^{2}) estate inherited by Princess Ruth Keʻelikōlani. Originally called Auaukai, Princess Likelike named it ʻĀinahau or "Cool Land" when she lived there with her husband, Archibald Scott Cleghorn, who turned it into a botanical garden. The stream that flowed through ʻĀinahau and emptied into the ocean where the present Outrigger Hotel is located, was called Apuakehau. She wrote a song about her home the "Cool Land".

=== Lyrics ===
Na ka wai lūkini	It is the perfume and the lovely
Wai anuhea o ka rose	Fragrance of roses that sweeten
E hoʻopē nei i ka liko o nā pua	The leaf buds of the flowering plants
Na ka manu pīkake	The peacocks
Manu hulu melemele	And the yellow feathered birds
Nā kāhiko ia o kuʻu home	Are the adornments of my home
Hui:	Chorus:
Nani wale kuʻu home	Beautiful is my home
ʻO ʻĀinahau i ka ʻiu	ʻĀinahau so regal
I ka holunape	Where the fronds
A ka lau o ka niu	Of the coco palms sway
I ka uluwehiwehi	The beautiful grove
I ke ʻala o nā pua	The fragrance of flowers
Kuʻu home, kuʻu home i ka ʻiuʻiu	At my home, my home so regal
Na ka makani	It is the gentle breeze
Aheahe i pā mai makai	From the sea
I lawe mai i ke	That brings the sweet
Onaona līpoa	Odor of līpoa sea weed
E hoʻoipo hoʻonipo me ke ʻala	Mingling with the fragrance of my love
O kuʻu home kuʻu home	Of my home, my home
Kuʻu home i ka ʻiuʻiu	My home so regal

== Maikaʻi Waipiʻo ==
Maikaʻi Waipiʻo translated as Beautiful Waipiʻo, was a song dedicated to Queen Emma whose beauty reminded Princess Likelike of Waipiʻo and was the inspiration for the song. In keeping with Hawaiian tradition, the song belonged to the Queen rather than the composer.

=== Lyrics ===
Maikaʻi Waipiʻo	Beautiful Waipiʻo
Alo lua i nā pali	With cliffs facing each other
E pōʻai a puni ana	Surrounded by cliffs
A hapa naʻe makai	With an opening toward the sea
Hui:	Chorus:
Maʻemaʻe ka pua	Beautiful are the blossoms
I ka holo aʻe a ka wai	Rain-washed
Ua ʻenaʻena i ka lā	Sun warmed and
Mōhala i nā pali	Blooming on the cliff
Hoihoi ka piʻina	Delightful the ascent
ʻO Koaʻekea	To Koaʻekea
Piʻi nō a hoʻomaha	An ascent that takes one to rest
I ka Holokūaīwa	At Holokūaīwa

== Ahe Lau Makani ==
Ahe Lau Makani, meaning there is a breath, was a waltz composed jointly with the Princess's sister Liliʻuokalani and Kapoli Kamakau, a mysterious collaborator who, to this day, remains unidentified.

== Kuʻu Ipo I Ka Heʻe Puʻe One ==
Kuʻu Ipo I Ka Heʻe Puʻe One translated as My Sweetheart In the Rippling Hills, was a song originally called Ka ʻOwe a ke Kai (The Murmuring of The Sea). The English translation is by Ruth Leilani Tyau and S. H. Elbert. Perhaps the most famous of Likelike's compositions, many believe it was written for a heartbroken girl who could not marry the love of her life.

=== Lyrics ===
Kuʻu ipo i ka heʻe puʻe one	My sweetheart in the rippling hills of sand
Me ke kai nehe i ka ʻiliʻili	With the sea rustling the pebbles
Nipo aku i laila ka manaʻo	There, the memory is impassioned
Ua kiliʻopu māua i ka nahele	In the forest where we delighted
Hui:	Chorus:
Eiā la e maliu mai	Here, please listen
Eiā ko aloha i ʻaneʻi	Here, your lover is here.
Hiki mai ana i ka pō nei	He came last night
Ua kiliʻopu māua i ka nahele	We delighted in the forest
Ka ʻowē nenehe a ke kai	The gentle rustle of the sea
Hone ana i ka piko waiʻolu	Softly in the pleasant center
I laila au la ʻike	Where I looked
Kiliʻopu māua i ka nahele	We delighted in the forest
Hiki ʻē mai ana ka makani	The wind came first
Ua hala ʻē aku e ka Puʻulena	The Puʻulena wind passed by
Ua lose kou chance e ke hoa	You've lost your chance, oh friend
Ua kiliʻopu māua i ka nahele	We delighted in the forest

== See also ==
- List of compositions by Leleiohoku II
- List of compositions by Liliʻuokalani
