= List of compositions by Leleiohoku II =

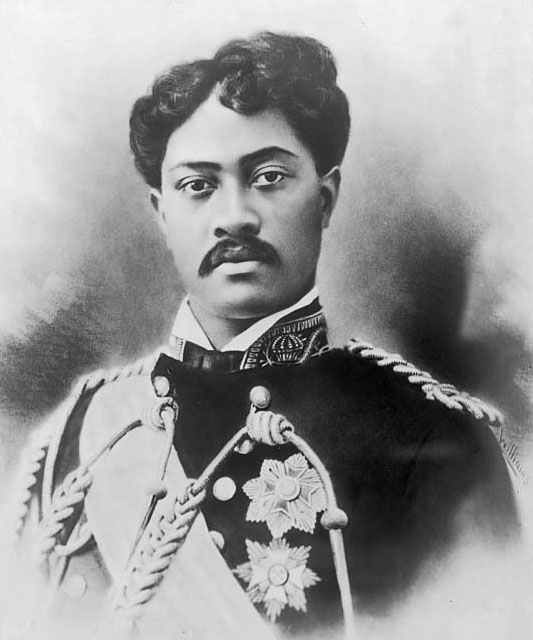
Prince Leleiohoku II

Prince William Pitt Leleiohoku II (1854–1877), was a poet and composer of many Hawaiian mele (songs), mostly love songs. He was the youngest of the Na Lani ʻEhā ("Royal Four"), which included his sisters Queen Liliʻuokalani (1838–1917) and Princess Miriam Likelike (1851–1887) and his brother King David Kalākaua (1836–1891). Leleiohoku and his siblings are credited with the musical revival enjoyed by Hawaiians during the last half of the 19th century. Many of his compositions adapted folk tunes of visiting merchants, sailors, and foreign settlers.

Liliʻuokalani said that Leleiohoku had a talent for composition "really in advance" of herself and Likelike. He founded the Kawaihau Singing Club and soon he and his colleagues were winning most of the royal song club competitions. Many claimed that he had one of the best male voices among native Hawaiians.

== Kāua I Ka Huahuaʻi ==
Kāua I Ka Huahuaʻi, translated as "We Two in the Spray", is considered one of Leleiohoku's greatest compositions. The song dates to the 1860s written when the Prince was 10–14 years old. It was recorded in 1913 by the Hawaiian Quintette. The song became popular around 1930, when Johnny Noble, bandleader at the Moana Hotel on Waikiki Beach, transformed it into the very jazzy: "Tahuwahuwai", better known as The Hawaiian War Chant. Despite the English name, this song was never a war chant. Unlike the immortal Aloha Oe of his sister Liliʻuokalani, the original lyrics of this love song are no longer popular but the melody of the song is known as "The Hawaiian War Chant". The Hawaiian lyrics describe a clandestine meeting between two lovers.

=== Lyrics ===
Kāua i ka huahuaʻi	You and I in the spray
E ʻuhene lā i pili koʻolua	Such joy, the two of us together
Pukukuʻi lua i ke koʻekoʻe	Embracing tightly in the coolness
Hanu lipo o ka palai	Breathing deep of the palai fern
Hui:	Chorus:
Auē ka huaʻi lā	Oh, such spray
ʻAuhea wale ana ʻoe	Listen
E kaʻu mea e liʻa nei	My desire
Mai hōʻapaʻapa mai ʻoe	Don't linger
O loaʻa pono kāua	Lest we be found
I aloha wau iā ʻoe	I loved you
I kāu hanahana pono	Your warmth
Laʻi aʻe ke kaunu me ia la	Calmed passion
Hōʻapaʻapai ka manaʻo	Preventing thought

== Nu`a O Ka Palai ==
Nu`a O Ka Palai This song can be found in Hopkin's Aloha Collection. English translation was by Mary Pukui.

=== Lyrics ===
Kau ano mai ana iaʻu la	Memories come back to me
Na kulu paka ua ʻeloʻelo la	Of a drenching rain
Elo ʻoe ʻelo au i ke anu la	You were soaked, I was soaked
Pulupē pau i ka anu	Made cold, well-drenched and very cold
Hui:	Chorus:
Aia i ka nuʻa ka palai la	There among the thickly growing ferns
Ka wewehi wai olu a loko la	We found a gentle rising of love within
Haliʻaliʻa mai ana la	Coming little by little
Iaʻu puʻuwai ka palili	Into my fluttering heart
Kao Hanalei i ke anu la	Hanalei was make icy with the cold
Hānupanupa i ke koʻekoʻe la	A cold that kept growing and growing
Koʻekoʻe au iā ʻoe la	I was chilled by you
E ka pua kuʻu pua i ka ʻia	O flower, my flower so high

== Ke Kaʻupu ==
Ke Kaʻupu translated as "albatross", composed by Lele-io-Hoku, about a sea bird, commonly known in English as an albatross; but how could a love song honor an albatross? (An alternative name is gooney). There are two tunes to this song, the newer one from the late 1930s.

=== Lyrics ===
Iā māua i ho‘ola‘i iho ai	While we are at peace
Kaha ‘ana ke ka‘upu i ka la‘i	Peacefully soars the albatross
I laila ke aloha ha‘anipo	And a sweetheart makes love
Ha‘alipo i ka poli pumehana	Makes love with warm heart
Kuhi au ua like me ia nei	I thought it was so
Ka lalawe ninihi launa ‘ole	Quiet taking over, unsurpassed
‘Akahi a ‘ike i ka noe	Never before to see such mist
Ua loha i ka wai ho‘olana	Drooping over calmed water
‘O ka hana nipo kau ‘ē ke ānu	To woo in the coolness
Ua maewa poniponi i ka nōe	To sway in the purple mist
Poahiahi wale ka ‘ikēna	And hazy view
Ke koni iho koni aku koni a‘ela	To throb here, throb there, throb so
Hui:	Chorus:
Inā pēlā mai kāu hana	So that's your way
Pākela ‘oi aku ka pipi‘i	Superior but bubbling
Kāu hana ‘olu no‘eau	Sweet clever acts
Kohu like me Wai‘ale‘ale	Like Wai`ale`ale

== Wahine Hele La ==
Wahine Hele La, or Wahine Hele La ʻO Kaiona, was a mele inoa (name song) composed by Leleiohoku for his relative Princess Bernice Pauahi. It was written after her visit to America accompanied by her husband, Charles Reed Bishop, who is referred to as Hiʻilei. Poʻaiʻai is the rain in Kahaluʻu, Oahu, and Kahoʻiwai is in Manoa Valley. English translations are by Kini Sullivan.

=== Lyrics ===
Honi ana i ke anu i ka mea huʻihuʻi	Smelling a fragrance in the cool air
Huʻi hewa i ka ʻili i ka ua Pôʻaihala	Chilled is the skin in the Pôʻaihala rain
Lei ana i ka mokihana i ka wewehi o Kaiona	Wearing a mokihana lei, the adornment of Kaiona
Lîhau pue i ke anu hau`oki o Kaleponi	Shivering in the cold, the icy cold of California
Hui:	Chorus:
E ô ka wahine hele lā o Kaiona	Respond, lady in the sunshine of Kaiona
Alualu wai liʻulā o ke kaha puaʻohai	Following the mirage where monkeypod blossoms bloom
O ka ua lanipô lua pô anu o ke Koʻolau	In the pouring, chilly Koʻolau rain
Kuʻu hoa o ka malu kî malu kukui o Kahoʻiwai	My companion in the ti and kukui grove of Kahoʻiwai
Hia`ai ka welina ka neneʻe a ka ʻôhelo papa	Delighting in the loveliness of creeping strawberries
Puapua i ka noe mohala i ke anu	Hidden in the fog that spreads in the cold
Noho nô me ka ʻanoi ka manaʻo ia loko	Remaining with delight within the thoughts
O loko hana nui, pauʻole i ke ana ʻia	So deep within, it is immeasurable
A ka wailele o Niakala ʻike i ka wai ânuenue	At Niagara Falls she saw rainbow hued water
I ka pôʻaiʻai a ka ʻehu haliʻi paʻa i laila	Surrounded by the mist that covers there
Pue ana i ka ʻehu wai, pupu`u i ke koʻekoʻe	Shivering in the foam, crouching in the cold
Eia iho ka mehana o ka poli o Hiʻilei	Here is warmth in the bosom of Hiʻilei

== Adios Ke Aloha ==
Adios Ke Aloha, translates as "Goodbye My Love" and was composed by the Prince in the 1870s. The used of the Spanish phrase adios shows Leleiohoku's influence by the music of the Mexican cowboys or vaqueros. Captain George Vancouver presented a gift of longhorn cattle to King Kamehameha I, at Kealakekua Bay, in 1793. A 10-year protection was placed on the cattle to allow them to multiply and assure the island of a constant food supply. The wild cattle became a menace, and in 1832 Kamehameha III invited 3 of Mexico's best cowboys, to teach the paniolos (as the cowboys came to be known) the art of roping. The English translations are by Mary Pukui. Like his sister's composition, Aloha Oe, it is a farewell song to a love one.

=== Lyrics ===
E kuʻu belle o ka pô laʻi laʻi	My belle of the clear night
Ka lawe mâlie a ka mahina	When the moon shines in its tranquility
Kô aniani mai nei e ke ahe	And a gentle breeze plays
ʻÂhea ʻoe hoʻolono mai	Oh, when will you listen to me
Hui:	Chorus:
ʻÂhea ʻoe, ʻâhea ʻoe	When, when
ʻOe hoʻolono mai	Will you listen?
I nei leo nahenahe	To this gentle plea?
Adios, adios ke aloha	Goodbye, goodbye beloved
E ka hauʻoli ʻiniki puʻu wai	O happiness that grips the heart
E ke aloha e maliu mai ʻoe	O beloved hearken to me
Ke hoʻolale mai nei e ke Kiu	The Kiu breeze brings a message
Ua anu ka wao i ka ua	That the forest is made cold by the rain
Hoʻokahi kiss	One kiss
Dew drops he maʻû ia	As cool as a dew drop, will do
E ka belle o ka noe lîhau	O belle of the ice cold mist
Eia au lā e ke aloha	Here I am, your lover
Ke huli hoʻi nei me ka noe	Returning empty handed

== Moani Ke ʻAla ==
Moani Ke ʻAla may have been written for a lover and a meeting in Manoa valley. English translations by Kini Sullivan and Mary Pukui. In Moani Ke ʻAla, he poetically compares a desirable but elusive lover to the famous Puʻulena wind of Kona.

=== Lyrics ===
ʻAuhea ʻo moani ke ʻala	Where are you my wind-borne fragrance
Hoapili o mi nei	My dearest, my closest companion
A he aha kau hana e pāweo nei	Why are you avoiding me
E ka makani Puʻulena	O Puʻulena breeze
Hui:	Chorus:
Kuhi au a he pono kāia	I thought all was well between us
Au e hoʻapaʻapa mai nei	Why do you keep me waiting?
E wiki mai ʻoe i pono kāua	Hurry that all may be well with us
I ʻolu hoʻi au e ke hoa	And I'll be pleased my dear companion
Hoʻohihi aku au e ʻike lā	I am longing to see
I ka wai māpunapuna	The bubbling spring
Ua Tuahine piʻo ānuenue	The Tuahine rain, the rainbow's arch
ʻO ia uka ʻiuʻiu	In that distant upland
Eia hoʻi au ua wehi	Here am I all bedecked
Ua liʻa ke onaona	Thrilled by the fragrance
Ia wai ʻona a ka lehua	And the sweet honey of lehua
Wai mûkîkî a ka manu	Honey sipped by the birds

== Others ==
- Nani Wale Lihue or Nani Wali Lihu’e
- Aloha No Wau I Ko Maka
- He Inoa No Kaʻiulani (a different song from the one with the same name by Liliʻuokalani)
- Nani Waipiʻo
- Hole Waimea (co-written with his singing club)

== See also ==
- List of compositions by Likelike
- List of compositions by Liliʻuokalani
