= List of compositions by Liliʻuokalani =

Liliʻuokalani (1838–1917), Queen of the Hawaiian Islands, was one of Hawaiʻi's most accomplished composers and musicians. She composed over 165 songs and chants. One of her most notable musical compositions is the popular song "Aloha ʻOe".

== "Aloha ʻOe" ==
(Farewell to Thee), Liliʻuokalani's most famous work about two lovers bidding farewell.

== "He Mele Lāhui Hawaiʻi" ==
(The Song of the Hawaiian Nation), was the third of Hawaiʻi's four national anthems. Liliʻuokalani wrote this song at the request of King Kamehameha V in 1866, well before she was queen.

== "Nohea I Muʻolaulani" ==
Nohea I Muʻolaulani, translated as Handsome One of Muʻolaulani sometimes as Handsome at Muʻolaulani, and also referred to simply as Muʻolaulani, dates to May 1885. It was composed for Liliʻuokalani's new home in Kapālama named Mu'olaulani which was opened with a gala party in May 1885. The Kapālama house was a source of great joy to her and became the subject of this song. It is now the site of the Lili'uokalani Children's Center.

He mea nui ke aloha	This great love of yours
Ke hiki mai i oʻu nei	Has come here to me
Meheʻo kuʻu lei kaimana ala	It is like my diamond necklace
Kāhiko o kuʻu kino	To adorn my person
Kuʻu lei popohe i ka laʻi	My lei so shapely in the calm
Nohea i Muʻolaulani	Handsome at Muʻolaulani
Ka beauty lā he mau ia	It is a beauty, always a thing forever
No nā kau ā kau	For all seasons

== "Ahe Lau Makani" ==
Ahe Lau Makani, translated as The Soft Gentle Breeze or There is a Zephyr, is a famous waltz composed by Queen Liliʻuokalani around 1868. Probably written at Hamohamo, the Waikīkī home of the Queen, this song appeared in "He Buke Mele O Hawaii" under the title He ʻAla Nei E Māpu Mai Nei. Ahe Lau Makani is used only verse 1 and 2, and may be an abridged version. Līlīlehua refers to the name of the gentle rain in Palolo Valley, Oahu. Verse 1, 2 and the Chorus is translated by Liliʻuokalani, and Verse 3, 4 by Hui Hānai.

Ahe Lau Makani was composed jointly with the Queen's sister Princess Likelike and Kapoli, a mysterious collaborator who, to this day, remains unidentified. The "Viennese-ness" of this waltz is especially evident in the hui, or chorus. Ahe Lau Makani describes a lover's sweet breath. It poetically describes someone's yearning for a loved one. As Dennis says, "In the figurative Hawaiian, this breeze is actually the breath of one who I admire, carried by the wind. Whoever the Queen wrote about, she got right into that person and conveyed it through the whole song."

He ʻala nei e māpu mai nei	There is a breath so gently breathing
Nā ka makani lau aheahe	So soft, so sweet, by sighing breezes
I lawe mai i kuʻu nui kino	That as it touches my whole being
Hoʻopumehana i kuʻu poli	It warms me in my heart
Hui:	Chorus:
E ke hoa o ke Ahe lau makani	We, fair one, together, shall enjoy such moments
Halihaliʻala o kuʻu ʻāina	While murmuring wind sweeps over my fatherland
He ʻala nei e moani mai nei	There is a breath so soft and balmy
Na ka ua noe Līlīlehua,	Brought by sweet zephyrs, Līlīlehua
I lawe mai i kuʻu poli	And while wafted to my bosom
Hoʻopumehana i ke aloha	It warms me with love
He ʻala nei e puia mai nei	There is a fragrance that saturates
Na ka makani anu kolonahe	A cool, soft breeze
I lawe mai nā a pili	Brought it to cling to me
Hoʻopumehana i ka manaʻo	Warming me with feelings
He ʻala nei e aheahe mai nei	There is a fragrance wafted here
Na ka leo hone a nā manu	The sweet call of birds
I lawe mai a loaʻa au	Brought it to find me
Hoʻopumehana i ko leo	Being warmed by your voice

== "By And By, Hoʻi Mai ʻOe" ==
By And By, Hoʻi Mai ʻOe, translated as By and By Thou Wilt Return, is a famous song composed by Queen Liliʻuokalani.

Aia i Mauna Kilohana	There at Mount Kilohana
O aʻu lehua ʻula i ka wao	My red lehua of the forest
Na maka ʻohe kiʻi i ka wai	Sharp eyes fetch the water
ʻAhaʻi ka ʻiʻini a ka manaʻo	And carry off the desire of the heart
Hui:	Chorus:
By and by hoʻi mai ʻoe	By and by you will return
E he ʻala hoene i ka poli	O fragrance that softly flutters my heart
By and by hoʻi mai ʻoe	By and by you will return
I ʻaneʻi kāua e laʻi ai	Here you and I will spend our days in rapture
E ʻae ana paha wau i ka ualo	I shall perhaps yield to the urge
I ka leo hea a ka pololei	To the calling voice of the land shell
E hoʻi aku no wau e pili	E shall return to be close
Me ka ua Kipuʻu o ka nahele	With the Kipuʻu rain of the forest
Mehe ua noe ala ko aloha	Like a misty rain is your love
E hana mau nei kuʻu nui kino	That thrills my whole being
ʻO kou kai ia e makoi ai	It is the love which you tender
Uʻi ʻaʻa ia pua i ka nani	That flower glows with beauty

== "Ka ʻŌiwi Nani" ==
Ka ʻŌiwi Nani, translated as The Beautiful Native, is a love song composed and translated by Liliʻuokalani on June 23, 1886, at Palolo, Oʻahu.

In The Queen's Songbook, editors Dorothy Kahananui Gillett and Barbara Barnard Smith note that it's not a surprise that this love song from 1886, when Lili‘uokalani was still a princess, comes from a time when her diaries "are strewn with references to a special 'friend', perhaps Henry Berger." Berger was the director of the Royal Hawaiian Band, and Gillett and Smith note the possibility "that the song celebrates a romantic liaison" with him. Even the title, which translates to "The Beautiful Form", or as the Queen herself translated it, Beautiful One, has possible romantic associations. It is one of the most compelling melodies of the Queen's songs, and I arranged it so the second verse is played in a relaxed 12/8 ballad style.

I ke ahiahi Pōʻakolu	It was on a Wednesday evening
Kuʻu ʻike ʻana iho	That tidings came to me
He ʻalele waha ʻole na ke aloha	A voiceless message from my loved one
E ʻī mai ana iaʻu	And thus it said to me
Hui:	Chorus:
E ʻī mai ana ʻī mai ana	And thus it said, thus it said to me
Aia Keʻala i ka nahele	Keala has gone to the woodland
Kahi i walea ai	And while on her downy bed of Palai
I ka ʻolu o ia uka	She inhales the perfume of the flowers
A he nani ʻiʻo nō ia pua	Bright and lovely indeed is that blossom
Me he lāʻī pala ala ka memele	Likened to the lāʻī pala (yellow ti leaf) so fair
Ka ʻōiwi nani o ke kā makahala	Or the beautiful form of the ka makahala
Lamalama i ka uka o Lanihuli	That sheds radiance over all of Lanihuli

== "Ka Hanu O Hanakeoki" ==
Ka Hanu O Hanakeoki, translated as The Scent of Hanakeoki, or sometimes plainly called Hanakeoki, is a famous song composed by Liliʻuokalani in 1874. It a piece mentioned in "The Queen's Songbook" and translated into English by Hui Hānai. The song may allude to property the Queen owned in Pālolo Valley.

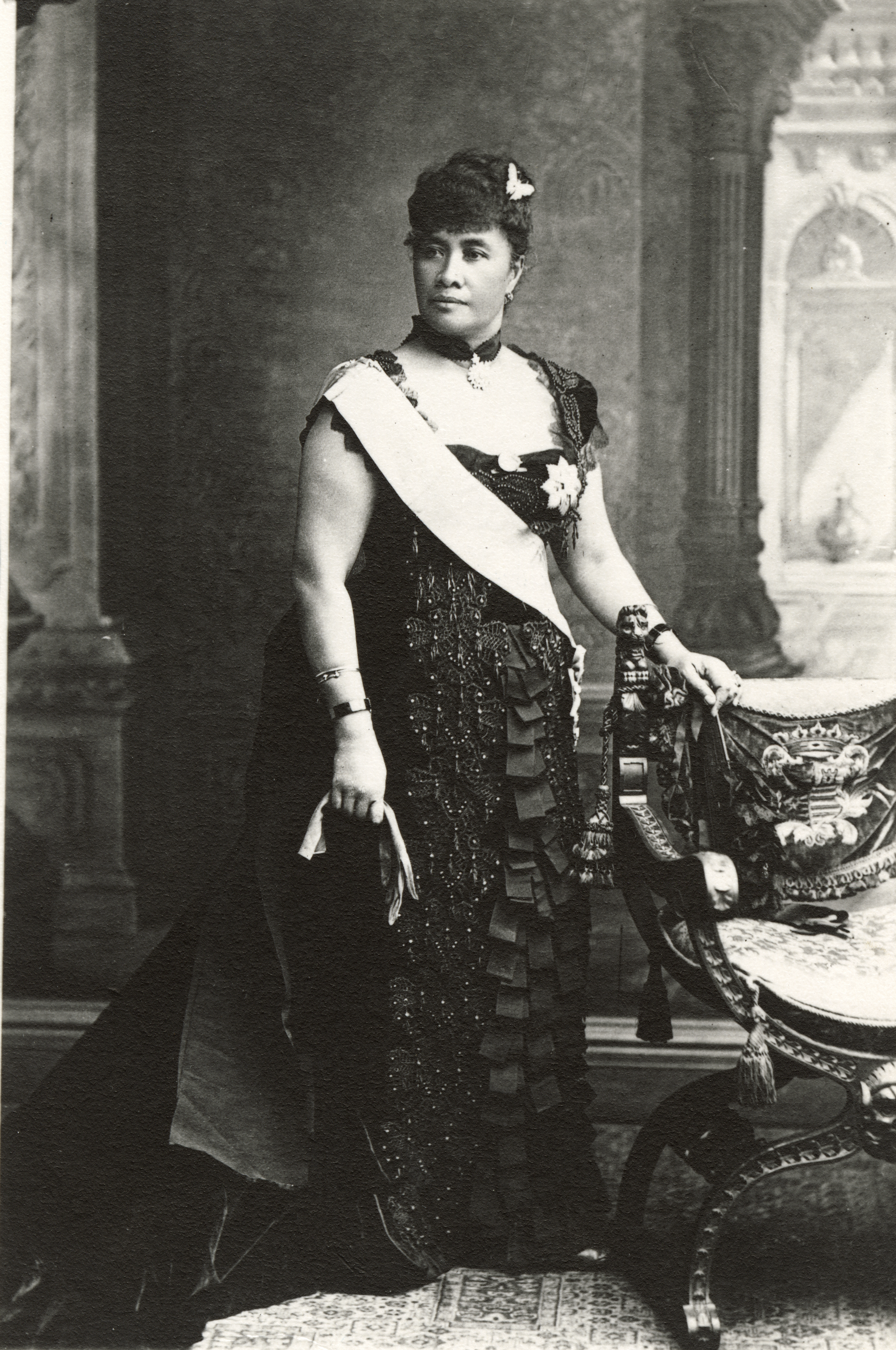

Nani wale ka hiʻona o ka manu lā	The features of the bird are so beautiful
ʻO ka ʻiʻiwi maka onaona pōlena lā	The sweet-eyed ʻiʻiwi pōlena
Noho i ka malu lāʻau lā	Dwelling in the shade of the forest
Ulunahele pō i ka lehua lā	Forest overshadowed with lehua flowers
Hui:	Chorus:
Ilihia wau i ke ʻala lā	I am overwhelmed with the fragrance
O ka hanu o Hanakeoki lā	The scent of Hanakeoki
Punihei ka manaʻo hoʻohihi lā	My thoughts are engulfed
Hanu ʻaʻala o Hanakeoki	By the sweet scent of Hanakeoki
Alia ʻoe e ka ʻamakihi lā	Wait ʻamakihi
Manu puapua lenalena lā	Yellow-tailed bird
E ālai nei i ka wai lā	Obstructing the water
Wai hālukuluku i ka pali lā	Water rushing noisily upon the cliff
E inu aku wau i kena lā	I want to drink the water to quench my thirst
I ka wai lehua a ka manu lā	On the bird's lehua nectar
Hō iho kāua ʻeloʻelo lā	Let's you and I indulge and be drenched
A hoʻi a e hoʻolaʻilaʻi lā	Then return to find contentment

== "Kuʻu Pua I Paoakalani" ==
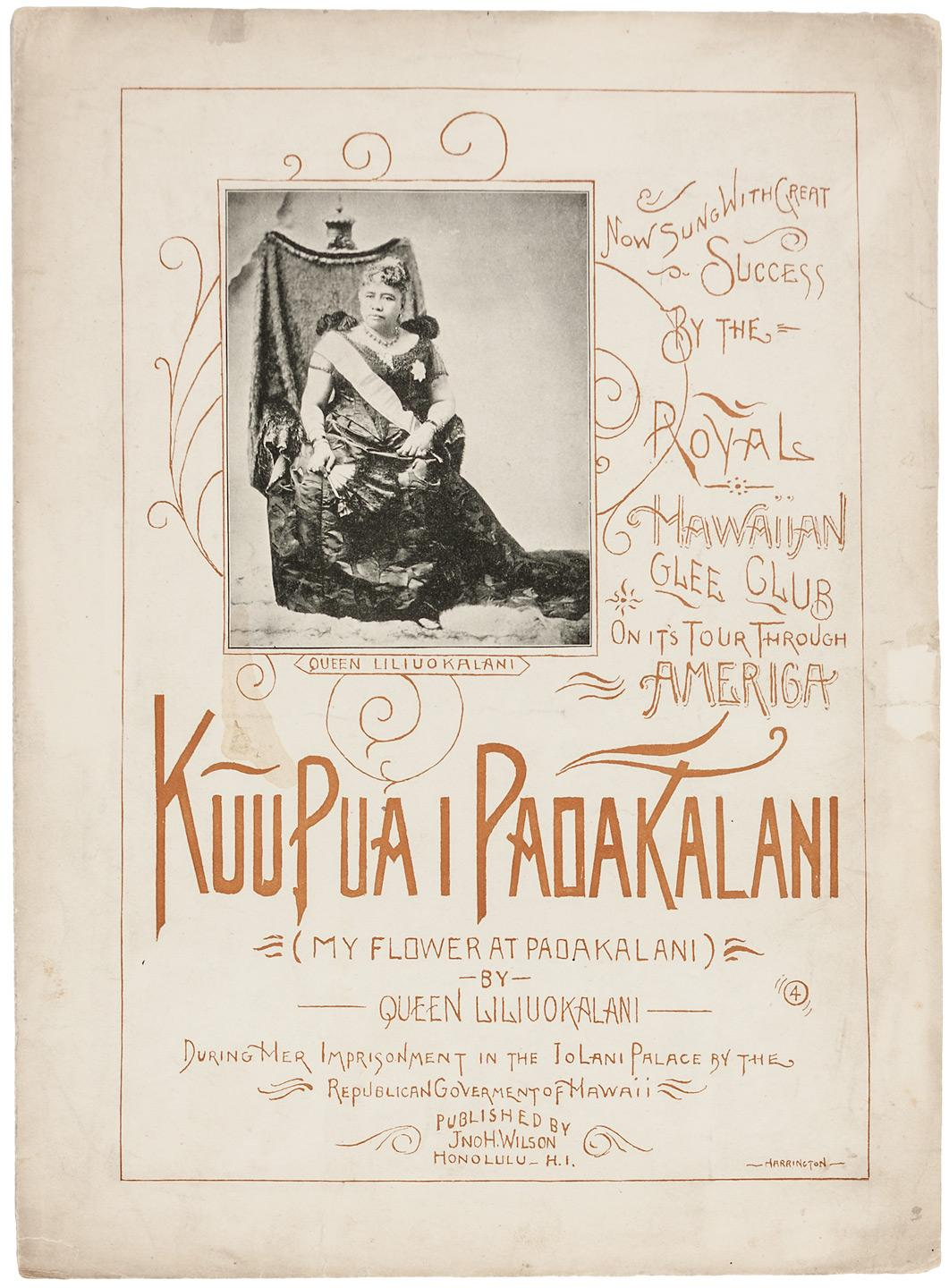

Kuʻu Pua I Paoakalani, often referred to simply as Paoakalani, is a famous song composed by Queen Liliʻuokalani while imprisoned in ʻIolani Palace. It is about her garden in Paoaokalani, from which a loyal haole supporter, John Wilson (whose mother, Evelyn T. Wilson, went into voluntary imprisonment with the Queen) regularly brought her flowers. These flowers were wrapped in newspaper, through which means she was able to read the news that was prohibited to her during her imprisonment. The song is a tribute to this young man, whom she held in very high esteem.

Performance of the song is known to be vocally challenging in terms of range, timing, power, and breath control. One of the most famous recorded renditions was made by activist/singer George Helm on the first live album that was released after his death in the Kahoʻolawe struggle.

E ka gentle breeze e pā mai nei	O gentle breeze that waft to me
Hoʻohāliʻaliʻa mai ana iaʻu	Sweet, cherished memories of you
E kuʻu sweet never fading flower	Of my sweet never fading flower
I bloom i ka uka ‘o Paoakalani	That blooms in the fields of Paoakalani
Hui:	Chorus:
ʻIke mau i ka nani o nā pua	I've often seen those beauteous flowers
O ka uka o Uluhaimalama	That grew at Uluhaimalama
ʻAʻole naʻe hoʻi e like	But none of those could be compared,
Me kuʻu pua i ka laʻi o	To my flower that blooms in the fields of
Paoakalani	Paoakalani
Lahilahi kona ma hiʻona	Her face is fair to behold
With softest eyes as black as jet	With softest eyes as black as jet
Pink cheeks so delicate of hue	Pink cheeks so delicate of hue
I ulu i ka uka o Paoakalani	That grew in the fields of Paoakalani
Nane ʻia mai ana kuʻu aloha	Now name to me the one I love
E ka gentle breeze e waft mai nei	Gentle breezes passing by
O come to me kaʻu mea e liʻa nei	And bring to me that blossom fair
I ulu ika uka o Paoakalani	That blooms in the fields of Paoakalani

== Manu Kapalulu ==
Manu Kapalulu, translated to Quail, is one of the numerous songs and chants composed by Queen Liliʻuokalani. Composed in November 1878, this was an admonishment from Liliʻuokalani to a disparaging remark. According to Hawaiian traditions lessons in life and morality were usually taught in music and riddles. Manu Kapalulu was about the Queen's annoyance with someone.

This song has many allusion to Hawaiian mythology. The Kilohana in verse 1, stanza 2 is in Kalihi Valley on O'ahu and was the sacred home of Haumea and Wakea. Verse 2, stanzas 3 and 4 is an allusion to the old Hawaiian religion. Although Liliʻuokalani embraced Christianity, she was very familiar with the practice of worshipping and feeding na aumakua (family gods). Kapo, the dark sorceress in verse 3, stanza 4, is Kapoʻulaʻkīnaʻu, the dual-natured goddess, daughter of Haumea and Wakea, and sister of Pele and Kamohoaliʻi. Her benevolent nature was Laka, the goddess of hula. This song also served as a mele inoa (name song) for Princess Kaʻiulani

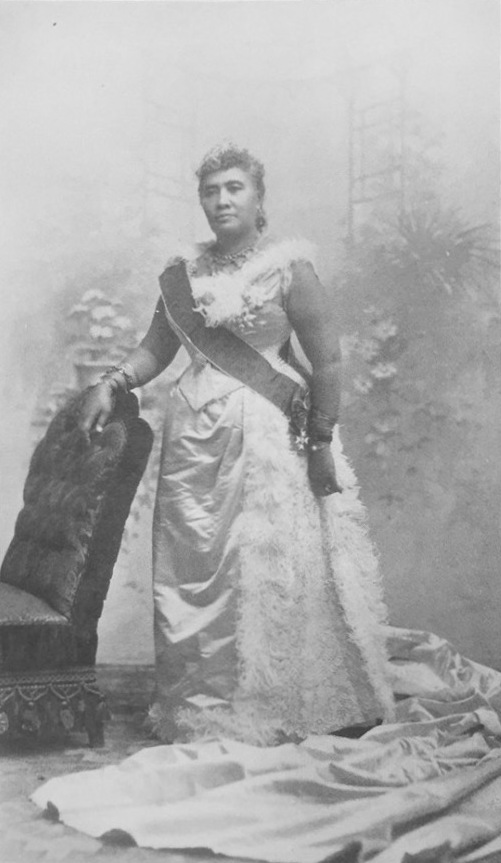

Noho nani iluna ke ao ʻōpua	Beauty dwells on a rain cloud
Kapu ʻihi kapu i Kilohana	Sacred at Kilohana
Haiamū ihola ka lehua	The lehua trees is surrounded by
I nā manu	The birds
Hui:	Chorus:
Kulikuli au iā ʻoe manu kapalulu	Be quiet, you quail
Hana wale mai nō iaʻu	Who nags me
He aha hoʻi ʻoe i koʻu manaʻo	You are nothing, in my opinion
ʻAe nō hoʻi	Yes, indeed
ʻŌlelo ana ʻoe i ko haʻi keʻe	You talk of the faults of others
Eia iho nō me ʻoe	Yet there is
Nā ʻaumakua peʻe i ka poli	An aumakua hiding in your bosom
I aʻo lūʻau ʻia	That is fed sacrifices
Kiʻina kahuna i Hawaiʻi	The darkness of Hawaiʻi is consulted
Kūkulu nā haʻilona	Signs and omens are sought
Kuhikuhi ke ola iā Kapo	Kapo is honored
ʻO ia nō hoʻi	This is so, indeed
Noho iho nā ʻoe ʻae pono iho	Stay and enjoy what you have
I kou pōmaikaʻi nui	Your great blessing
ʻIke ʻia ai he ulakolako	Your prosperity be known
ʻO ia nō hoʻi	This is so, indeed

== Nani Nā Pua Koʻolau ==
Nani Nā Pua Koʻolau, translated as The Flower of Koʻolau or Beautiful Are the Flowers of Koʻolau is a song composed by Queen Liliʻuokalani. Written in 1860, this was one of Liliʻuokalani's first published works or probably the first; it was published in 1869 both in Hawaiian and English, one of her first works to appear in print. It was signed L.K. (Lydia Kamakaʻeha) Pākī, the name she used until her marriage in 1862 to John Owen Dominis. The English translation is by Liliʻuokalani herself.

This song demonstrates her poetic skills in which romantic love, love of nature and love of the land are happily entwined. This setting was written for the popular Pacific Rim Choral Festival which takes place in Hawaiʻi each summer.

Nani nā pua Koʻolau	The flowers of Koʻolau in their beauty
I memele i ka uka	Fill the vale, fill with golden gleam
Ka uka o Kuihanalei	I cull and wreathe them for my loved one
I lei mau no ke aloha	At morn and night she fills my waking dream
ʻAuhea wale ana ʻoe	Where are you, fairest of all fair ones
E ka pua o ka lokelani	Where are you sweetest of all sweets
ʻO ka ʻoi aku nō ʻoe	You are a flower of Paradise
Ma mua o ka nae ʻala	That the morning breeze ever kindly greets
Mahalo au ʻo ka nani	I praise your beauty, my fair one
Nā lehua o Līhau	You are the flower of all flowers to me
He ʻala kūpaoa	The lehua flower whose ardent sweetness
Anuanu o ka nahele	Overpowers the wanderer over the lea
I wili ʻia me ka maile	And I cry "where are you, my loved one"
Lauliʻi o Koʻiahi	My spirit wants to be with you
ʻAuhea lā ia pua	To taste hours of tranquil pleasure
ʻAkipohe o Halealoha	And wander neath Koiahi's tree
Ua ola nā kaua	The trilling notes of hidden songsters
I ka wai huna a ka manu	As they sport around the jasmine bower
He ʻala pua pīkake	The scent yet in my memory lingers
Huli au a hoʻomaʻū	Reminds me of you, the fairest flowers
ʻAuhea wale ana ʻoe	Of Viliau, the sweetest blossom
E ka pua ʻo ka Viliau	Without you, my life is lonely
Hoʻi mai nō kāua	Come fill my hours with bliss, I pray thee
E pili me ke aloha	My flower, my bird, my chief and chosen one

== "Ka Wiliwili Wai" ==
Ka Wiliwili Wai, sometimes plainly called Wiliwiliwai, translated to The Lawn Sprinkler or The Twisting of the Water, is a famous song composed by Queen Liliʻuokalani who wrote the words and the music. The story behind the song goes: As the Queen was sitting on her lanai at Washington Place, she saw something unusual next door in her neighbor, Dr. McKibben's yard, a lawn sprinkler going round and round. Fascinated, the Queen watched for a long time spinning this tune to its rhythm.

=== Lyrics ===
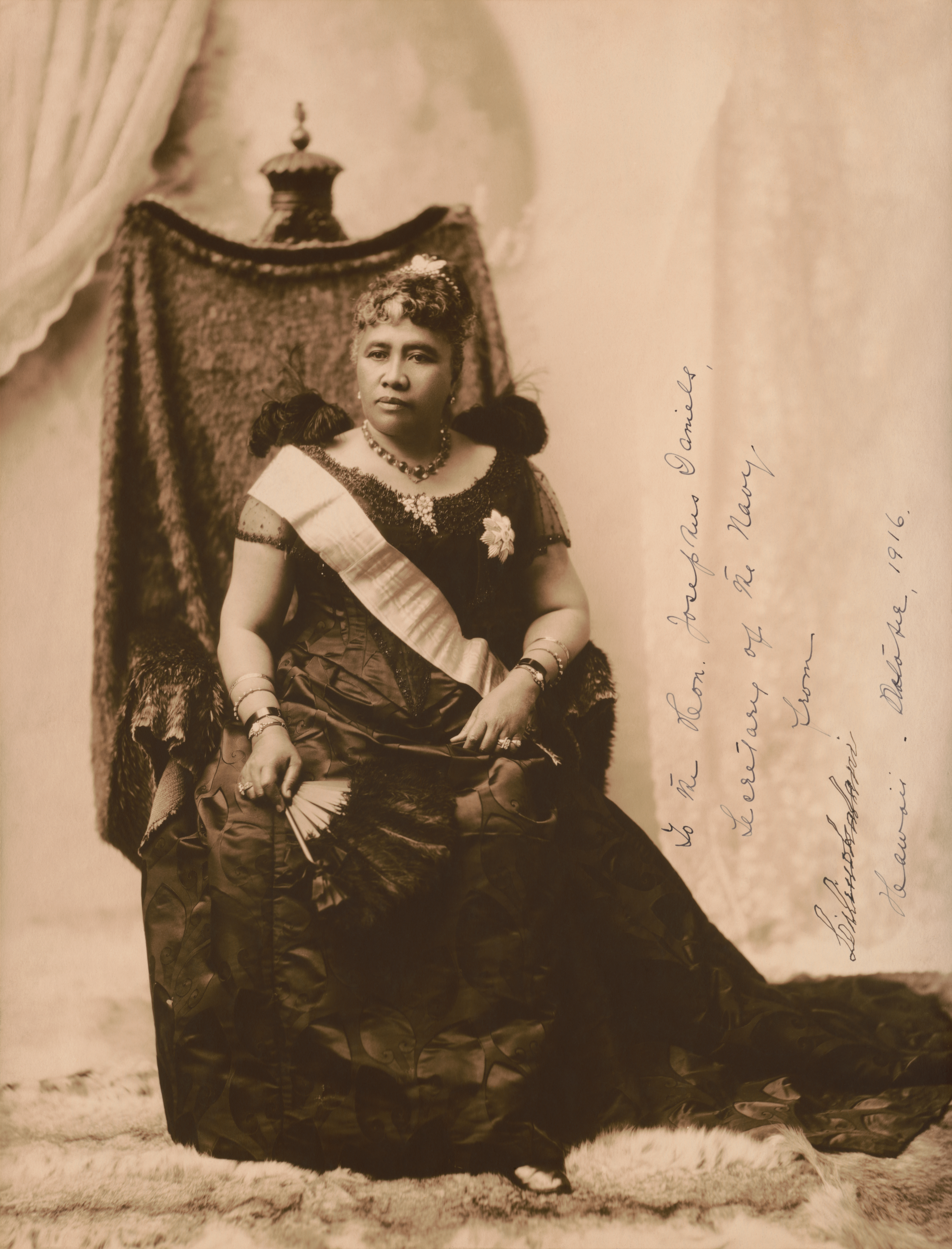

E ka wiliwiliwai	O lawn sprinkler
Koʻiawe i ka laʻi	Circling quietly
A heaha kau hana	What are you doing
E naue mālie nei	As you silently revolve?
Hui:	Chorus:
Ei nei, ei nei	Say there, say there
ʻE poahi mai nei	You revolving object
Ahea, ahea	When, oh when
ʻOe kaohi mai	Will you slow down
O kīpau o ia la	Unusually active
Ua nihinihi	Sending out sprays like rain
Kuʻu iki iho hoʻi	Lessen your speed
I inu aku au	That I may drink

== "Pauahi ʻO Kalani" ==
Pauahi ʻO Kalani, translated as Pauahi, The Royal One, was composed by Liliʻuokalani in 1868. It honors Princess Bernice Pauahi Bishop, the great-granddaughter of Kamehameha I and Liliʻuokalani's beloved foster sister. It was written in 1868 prior to the accession of Liliʻuokalani's family. They were on a trip to the island of Hawaiʻi and had visited Puna and the Panaʻewa forest in the Hilo district. Liliʻuokalani wrote this song at Mānā. The Bishop Estate, Pauahi's continuing legacy, created and maintains the Kamehameha Schools. High school students at Kamehameha sing this song every year on Founder's Day, 19 December, the date of Pauahi's birth. The song was translated by Mary Kawena Pukui.

=== Lyrics ===
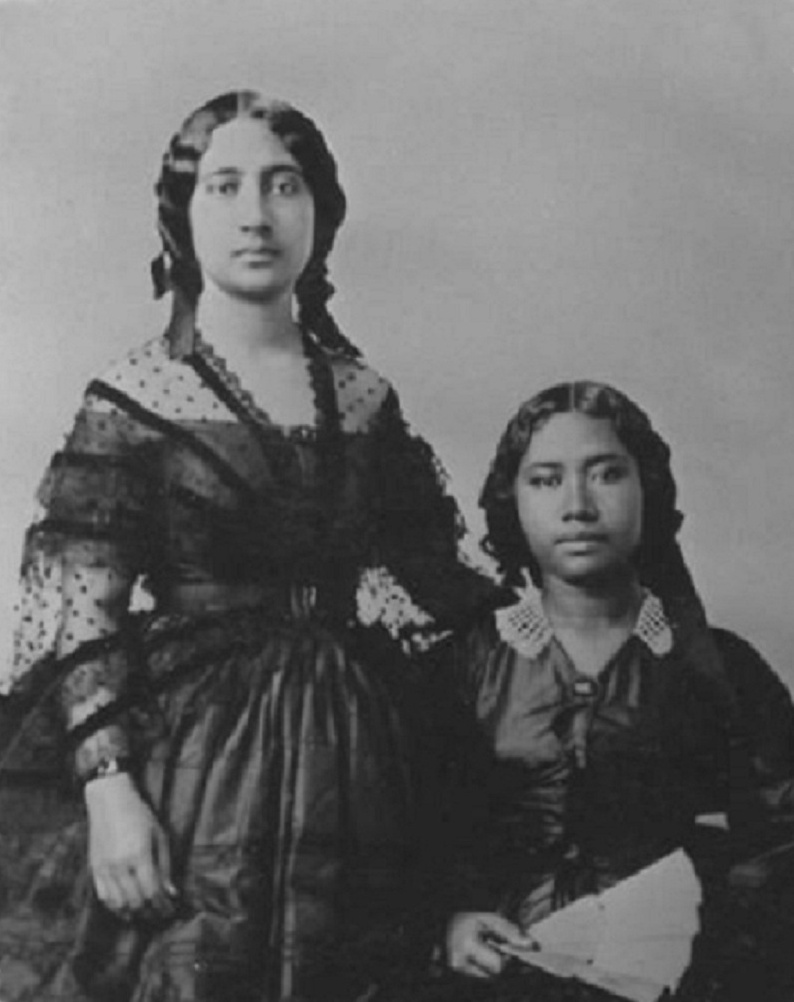
Liliʻuokalani and Bernice Pauahi Bishop

Noho ana ka wahine i ke anu o Mānā	The woman dwells in the cold of Mānā
Mahalo i ka nani nohea o ka nahele	Admiring the lovely beauty of the forest
Hui:	Chorus:
E ola ʻo Kalani e Pauahi lani nui	Long live, Pauahi, the heavenly one
A kau i ka pua ʻaneʻane	To extreme old age
E ola ʻo Kalani e Pauahi lani nui	Long live, Pauahi, the heavenly one
E ola loa nō a kau i ka wēkiu	Live until she reaches the highest place
Ua ʻike i na paia ʻaʻala hoʻi o Puna	She has seen the fragrant bowers of Puna
Ua lei na maile aʻo Panaʻewa hoʻi	And has worn leis of maile of Panaʻewa
hui	chorus
Hoʻi ana no naʻe ke aloha i na kini	But her love returns to multitudes
I ke one hānau i ka home i ke kaona	Of her birthplace, the home in the town

== "Pelekane" ==
Liliʻuokalani composed Pelekane, translated as England or Britain, in 1887 after she and Queen Kapiʻolani went to England for the Golden Jubilee of Queen Victoria. On this occasion, Queen Kapiʻolani wore a parure of catseye shells and a gown embroidered with blue peacock feathers. In the second verse, Liliʻuokalani describes the British Queen-Empress as the topmost blossom.

Ka Hae Hawaiʻi, or the Flag of Hawaii modeled after that of United Kingdom's

Union Flag used for the United Kingdom of Great Britain and Ireland, Hawaiʻi's most trusted ally.

=== Lyrics ===
Nani wale hoʻi kuʻu ʻike ana	It was wonderful to see
Kēlā ʻāina kamahaʻo	That marvelous country
ʻĀina kaulana i ka nani	Land famed for its beauty
Ka ikaika me ka hanohano	Its strength and majesty
Hui:	Chorus:
I laila kuʻu ʻupu kuʻu liʻa	Fond recollections and admiration
Ka manaʻo nui e waiho aʻe nei	Remains ever with me
O ka ʻike lihi aku iā Pelekane	I have caught a glimpse of England
A he nani ia ʻae ua hiki nō	Tales of its beauty are indeed true
Kuko no loko a hoʻokō	My desire to see was fulfilled
E ʻike i ka pua i ka wēkiu	I have seen the topmost blossom
Honi ka makani o laila	I have inhaled the air there
I ka hane welelau i kuʻu papālina	And felt the breeze brush my cheek

== "Pelekane" by Elizabeth Kuahaia ==
Another song of the same title, written by Elizabeth Kuahaia, is a song about the innocence lost in globalization/modernization. It is about the sinking of the ship, the Lusitania, in 1915. It was an event that helped create the concept of a "World War."

Pelekane means "Britain" and reveals the long-standing affinity that the Native Hawaiian people felt for England. It was the British that the Hawaiian Kingdom attempted to emulate and identify with – so much so that the royal contingent traveled to England to attend Queen Victoria's Golden Jubilee in 1887 and adopted the "Union Jack" symbol in the Kingdom of Hawaiʻi flag. This song may refer to England owning the Lusitania.

Unlike most other Native Hawaiian songs, it is written without the beautiful imagery of nature. Instead, it describes the use of explosives and torpedoes. This is warfare without warriors in hand-to-hand combat, with the concept of "civilians" redefined by wholesale destruction of places. In a way, this is a modern protest song is in the style of Kaulana Nā Pua. This piece foreshadows the militarization of Hawaiʻi as the Western outpost for United States military forces. This militarization of the islands is an important aspect of Native Hawaiian experience. Not only are many areas reserved by the military, but the island economy is dependent upon it.

=== Lyrics ===
Hakakā kaulana puni i ke ao lā	Famous conflict throughout the world
Ke kaua weliweli ma Eulopa	The terrible war in Europe
Ma ka nūpepa i haʻi maila lā	In the newspapers it said
ʻO ka topeto kau i ka beli	The torpedo struck the belly (of the ship)
Weliweli nā hana ke ʻike aku lā	Dreadful deeds, horrible to look upon
ʻO nei lima koko he aloha ʻole	Merciless bloody hands
Haʻina ʻia mai ʻana ka puana lā	Let the story be told
Ke kaua weliweli ma Eulopa	Of the terrible war in Europe

== "Puna Paia ʻAʻala" ==
Puna Paia ʻAʻala, translated to Puna's Fragrant Bowers, and other translation include Puna's Fragrant Glades and Puna's Sweet Walls. It is famous love song composed by Queen Liliʻuokalani in July 1868, who composed a total of 165 pieces in her life. The setting is the Puna District on the Island of Hawaiʻi, which was renowned for its groves of fragrant hala (Pandanus tectorius). The first two verses were published in He Buke Mele Hawaiʻi and the third verse is from a Bishop Museum manuscript. The fourth verse was preserved by Bill Kaiwa. Verse 1, 2, and hui translated by Liliʻuokalani. Verses 3 and 4 translated by Hui Hānai.

Along with Ahe Lau Makani and Paia Ka Nahele, composed in the same year, these two waltzes are especially evident in the hui, or chorus, of Puna Paia Aʻala. These three songs that took the form as waltzes, were a fresh departure for Liliʻuokalani. Their lyrics are full of romance, and the rhythmic buoyancy and grace of the music place them among her most memorable melodies.

=== Lyrics ===
Iā Puna paia ʻaʻala	Puna's bowery walls of fragrance are
Pili mau na ke ona ona	Groves laden with sweet flowers
I laila ke kāunu ana	There is where my heart yearns to be
Kau pono ana na ka manaʻo	To dwell there is my sincere desire
Hui:	Chorus:
Puna paia ʻaʻala	Puna's shaded bowery walls
Kilihea i ke onaona	Pleasant and redolent with perfume
Ona wela i ke aloha	Sweet language, full of love
Ua lawa iā ʻoe me aʻu	Binding you to me, forever
Hoʻohihi i ka nani	I long to see you
Pua mai a ka lehua	Flower of the lehua
Ānehe au e kiʻi	Let me take you and pluck you
I pua kau no kuʻu umauma	And press you close to me
ʻO ka ʻike keia	Now that I know
ʻO wau nō kou hoa like	That you and I are alike
Pelā iho hoʻi kāua	Let us wait a while
Ke ano laʻi mai nei ka ʻōpua	As the cloud bank reposes in serenity
Hai lohi ka manaʻo	The thought is slow to conjure
Loliʻi nā pua i ka ʻiu	As the blossoms above repose
Kali ana hoʻlono i ka leo	Awaiting, listening for the voice
A hea mai e hoʻokomo wau	To call one to come in

== "Sanoe" ==
Sanoe, is a famous song composed by Queen Liliʻuokalani who wrote the words and the music. "Sanoe" is the Hawaiian word meaning – the mist that drifts over our mountains – and alludes to the man drifting in like the mist to see his ipo (sweetheart). It is in the Queen's Song Book and also in He Mele Aloha. Liliʻuokalani composed this while still a princess in the court of her brother King David Kalākaua. The song describes a possibly clandestine love affair or romance in the royal court. This version is based on Robert Cazimero's choral arrangement for the Kamehameha Schools Song Contest. Steve composed the interlude between the second and third verses for this recording. Queen Liliʻuokalani originally wrote Sanoe in common time, though today it is almost always performed in triple meter. Where and how this change occurred is a mystery.

This affair in the royal court is centered on Sanoe, a love affair of two members of the royal family that were in love but promised marriage to other people, Princess Likelike and Colonel Curtis Piehu Iaukea. Kapeka was the joint composer to this song. Queen Lili‘uokalani indicates she composed Sanoe with "Kapeka", her friend whose real name was Elizabeth Sumner Achuck.

Sanoe was brought back into general circulation by ʻukulele master Eddie Kamae and Gabby with the Sons of Hawaiʻi on "MUSIC OF OLD HAWAIʻI".

=== Lyrics ===
ʻAuhea ʻoe e Sanoe	Where can you be, Sanoe?
Hoʻopulu liko ka lehua	Moistened by the lehua buds
Eia hoʻi au	Here I am
Ke kali nei i ko leo	Waiting to hear your voice
ʻO ka pane wale mai no	For the answer only you can give
ʻOlu wau mehe wai ʻala	Refreshing with a sweet fragrance
Honehone me he ipo ala	Appealing softly as a sweetheart
Paila i ka nui kino	Stirring the whole body
E kala neia kino	It's been a while since this body
I piliwi ai i laila	Believed all that was there
E ko ai o ka manaʻo	How is it possible
Pehea e hiki ai	To fulfill thoughts of love?
Ke hea mai nei water lily	The water lily warns us
Ke ao mai ʻoe ia kaua	Be careful
Eia aʻe no o pelo	Here comes the carrier of tales
Manu ʻahaʻi ʻōlelo	The bird who gossips
Lohe aku nei na kuhina nui	The titled persons have heard
A he ʻahahui ko Loma	Of a gathering in Rome
Ke ʻoni aʻe la iluna	Moving now upward
E like me Likelike	Like the Princess Likelike

== "The Queen's Jubilee" ==
The Queen's Jubilee is a famous song composed by Princess Liliʻuokalani of Hawaiʻi to commemorate the Golden Jubilee of Queen Victoria of the United Kingdom, which Princess Liliʻuokalani attended with a royal contingent from Hawaiʻi.

=== Lyrics ===
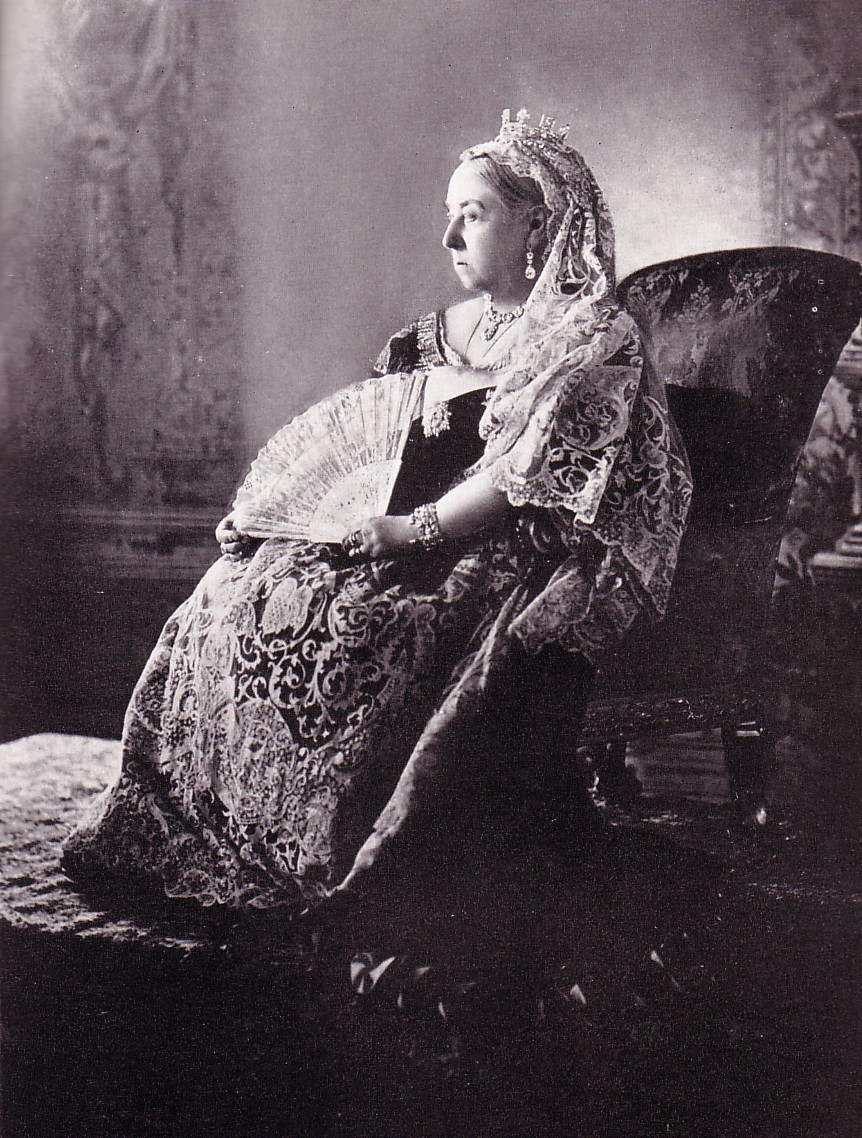
Queen Victoria in 1887 during her Golden Jubilee. During her reign she helped to protect the Hawaiian Kingdom. She was great friends with many Hawaiian monarchs and was Prince Albert's godmother. This friendship did not end with the Kamehameha Dynasty.

Mahalo piha, Mōʻī ʻo ʻEnelani	All hail to you, Great Queen of England
Kuʻi kou kaulana nā ʻāina pau	Fair Queen who rules over land and sea
Na kai ākau nā one hema	From northern seas to southern shores
ʻIkea kou ʻihi mana nui	Your way is known both far and near
Eia mākou i kou kapa kai	We come to your shores, gracious lady
ʻI kou lā nui Iubilī	On this great day of your Jubilee
I hiʻi mai i kou mākou aloha	To bring kind greetings from afar
Maluna ou ka malu o ka Lani	May heaven bless you, long may you reign.
Hauʻoliʻoli ʻEmepela o ʻInia	All hail, all hail, Empress of India
I kēia makahiki Iubili	In this your year of Jubilee
ʻĀkoakoa nā aliʻi ʻaimoku	Now kings, queens and princes great
A puni ke ao holoʻokoʻa	Have all assembled here today
E hiʻilani e mililani	To pay due homage and reverent love
Ua hui pūʻia me Hawaiʻi	Hawaiʻi joins with loyal fervour
E uhi mai ka lani i kona nani	May Heaven smile on you
E ola ka mōʻī ke Akua	God bless the Queen, long may she live

== "The Queen's Prayer" ==
The Queen's Prayer, or in Hawaiian Ke Aloha O Ka Haku. It was published as Liliʻuokalani's Prayer, with the Hawaiian title and English translation ("The Lord's Mercy") now commonly called "The Queen's Prayer". It is a famous mele, composed by Queen Liliʻuokalani, March 22, 1895, while she was under house arrest at ʻIolani Palace. This hymn was dedicated to Victoria Kaʻiulani, her niece and heir apparent to the throne.

Queen Liliʻuokalani wrote this at the bottom of the manuscript: "Composed during my imprisonment at ʻIolani Palace by the Missionary party who overthrew my government." She was referring to the illegal Overthrow of the Hawaiian monarchy by U.S. business interests backed by the U.S. government.

=== Lyrics ===
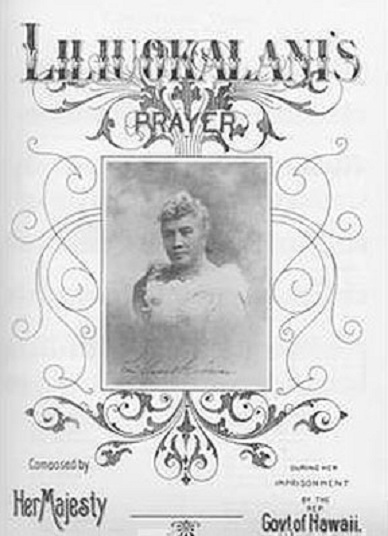

ʻO kou aloha nō	Your loving mercy
Aia i ka lani	Is as high as Heaven
A ʻo Kou ʻoia ʻiʻo	And your truth
He hemolele hoʻi	So perfect
Koʻu noho mihi ʻana	I live in sorrow
A paʻahao ʻia	Imprisoned
ʻO ʻoe kuʻu lama	You are my light
Kou nani koʻu koʻo	Your glory, my support
Mai nānā ʻinoʻino	Behold not with malevolence
Nā hewa o kānaka	The sins of man
Akā e huikala	But forgive
A maʻemaʻe nō	And cleanse
No laila e ka Haku	And so, o Lord
Ma lalo o kou ʻēheu	Protect us beneath your wings
Kō mākou maluhia	And let peace be our portion
A mau loa aku nō	Now and forever more
Āmene	Amen

== "Tūtū" ==
Tūtū, translated as Granny, is a famous mele hula composed by Queen Liliʻuokalani. Mentioned in the song is Kaʻalaʻalaʻa, which refers to the area of lower Nuʻuanu below Maʻemaʻe Hill. This hula was composed for a benefit program at Kaumakapili Church in Palama. Maria Heleluhe danced the part of the tūtū (granny) and 7 little girls performed as the grandchildren. The Queen taught the girls to sing the song with her and she accompanied them on her guitar. The song received 5 encores and the performers were showered with money.

=== Lyrics ===
Aia i Kaʻalaʻalaʻa	There lived at Kaʻalaʻalaʻa
Kuʻu wahi kupuna wahine	My aged, dear old grandmother
Ua nui kona mau lā	Her days were full of numbers
ʻO ka noho ʻana i ke ao nei	That she lived in this world of care
Kana hana i ke kakahiaka	Her first duty in the morning
ʻO ka wehe i ka Paipala nui	Was to turn to the great Bible
Kiʻi akula i nā makaaniani	Then searching for her glasses
A penei e kau ai	She'd place them on her nose
Hui:	Chorus:
E aloha kākou iā ia	Now we must all show her reverence
E mālama kākou iā tūtū	We must all love our dear Tūtū
E hoʻano kākou iā ia	We must do all to honor her
Ko kākou kupuna wahine	Our dear Grandma Tūtū
A kau mai e ke ahiahi	As the hour of eve drew near
Hoʻomākaukau e pule	She'd prepare for eve's devotion
Kiʻi akula i nā makaaniani	And now seeks her glasses
Auwe! Ua nalowale	But lo, they are not there
Aia i kā lae	She had placed them on her forehead
I ka lae kahi kau ai	High up above her brow
Ua poina loa ʻia	And there she soon forgot them
I luna i ka lae	High up above her forehead

== Other compositions ==
- "He Inoa Wehi No Kalanianaʻole" (A Name Adornment For Kalanianaʻole), honoring her young nephew Jonah Kuhio Kalanianaʻole
- "He ʻAla Nei E Mapu Mai Nei" (Soft, Constant Breeze)
- "A Hilo Au"
- "He Pule" (A Prayer), 1874
- "Ka Wai Mapuna" (The Water Spring), 1876
- "Onipaʻa" (Stand Firm), a simple piece written for a singing school
- "Liko Pua Lehua" (Tender Leaves of the Lehua Flower)
- "Ka Wai ʻOpuna Makani" (Wind of the Water-of-Cloud-Banks) to honor Lunalilo and obliquely to condemn Queen Emma's quest for the throne.
- "Ka Hae Kalaunu" (The Flag of the Crown), to glorify her families triumph in the election of 1874.
- "E Kala Kuʻu ʻUpu ʻAna" (Long Years Have I Yearned for Thee), written in 1873.
- "La ʻi Au E" (Peaceful Am I)
- "Lei Ponimoʻi" (Carnation Wreath or as more commonly referred to as Carnation Lei), composed November 1874.
- "Akahi Koʻu Manene" (I Have Just Shuddered), written at Wailuku
- "Pride of Waiehu", written at Lahaina
- "Makani Waipio" (Lovely Waipio)
- "He Inoa no Kaiʻulani" (A Name Song for Kaiʻulani); written for her niece.
- "He Kanikau No Lele-Io-Hoku"; a dirge for Leleiohoku, Queen Lili'uokalani's brother who died of rheumatic fever at age 22 in 1877.
- "Kokohi" (To Hold Forever)
- "Puia Ka Nahele" (Forest Imbued with Fragrance), 1868.
- "Ehehene Ko ʻAka" (Giggle, Giggle Goes Your Laughter)
- "He Aliʻi No Wau" (I Am Indeed, a Chief)
- "Pipili Ka Ua I Ka Nahele" (The Rain Clings Close to the Forest)
- "Ima Au Ia ʻOe E Ke Aloha" (I have Sought Thee, My Beloved)
- "Paia Ka Nahele" (The Fragrant Woods)
- "Thou E Ka Nani Mae ʻOle" (Thou Art the Never Fading Beauty) for which sixteen-year-old Miriam Likelike share credit.
- "Naʻu No ʻOe" (You are Mine), a charming waltz
- "Lamalama i luna ka ʻonohi la" --- (Bright above is the rainbow ---)
- "Lilikoʻi" composed on Maui as a mele inoa (name song) for her hānai daughter Lydia
- "He ʻAi Na Ka Lani" (Foods For the Royalty), in honor of Kalakaua.
- "Anahulu", which took its name from a stream in Waialua, one of Liliʻu's favorite areas.
- "Ka lpo Nohea" (Gem of Beauty, often translated as : The Handsome Sweetheart).
- "A Chant" written for Bernice Pauahi Bishop's funeral, draws its text from the Book of Job and is the sole work dated 1884
- "Ka Huna Kai" (The Sea Spray), written in London expressing a fond longing for Hawaiʻ'i.
- "Kiliʻoulani" (Fine Rain of the Heavenly Pinnacle)
- "Leha Ku Koa Mau Maka" (Lift Up Your Eyes) based on Psalm 121, dated June 1895.
- "E Kuʻu Hoʻola" (My Saviour), from Psalm 126, dated June 1895.
- "Himeni Hoʻole'a A Davida" (David's Hymn of Praise), also from Psalm 126, dated June 1895.
- "Ka Wai ʻApo Lani" (Heavenly Showers), a song expressing hope that she would be returned to the throne.
- "Ke Aloha ʻĀina" (Love for the Land), alternately called He Lei Aloha (A Lei of Love). The song is a plea for the land and life of a nation and an exhortation to her people to stand resolute.
- "Ka Wai O Niakala", a mele hula kuʻi inspired by a trip to Niakala she had made from Boston.
- "Hoʻokahi Puana" (One Answer), in which she pronounced clearly, without the customary veiled language of Hawaiian chant, her views the new government of the Republic of Hawaiʻi.

== See also ==
- List of compositions by Likelike
- List of compositions by Leleiohoku II
