= Hawaiian War Chant =

Song
- Language: Hawaiian
- Written: 1860s
- Songwriter: Prince Leleiohoku

"Hawaiian War Chant" is an American popular song whose original melody and lyrics were written in the 1860s by Prince Leleiohoku. The original title of the song was Kāua I Ka Huahuaʻi or "We Two in the Spray." It was not written as a chant, and the Hawaiian lyrics describe a clandestine meeting between two lovers, not a battle. The English title therefore has nothing to do with the song as it was originally written and performed in Hawaii.

== History ==
Under the original title, the song was recorded around June 1911 by the Crowel Glee Club, and released by Columbia Records.

English lyrics by Ralph Freed were written in 1936 and the melody changed somewhat at that time by Johnny Noble. Tommy Dorsey recorded it on November 29, 1938, and it was released on Victor Records in the United States and Canada. In a 1942 performance, Dorsey's band featured drummer Buddy Rich and trumpeter Ziggy Elman for this song. The song was featured in the 1942 film Ship Ahoy starring Eleanor Powell, Red Skelton and the Tommy Dorsey Band. The song features prominently in Walt Disney's Enchanted Tiki Room, a Disney theme park attraction that first opened at Disneyland in 1963.

Spike Jones recorded the song for Victor Records in February 1946 with Carl Grayson on vocal. It reached number eight on the charts, according to Joel Whitburn.

== Sources ==
- Hawaiian War Chant
