= Kapoli Kamakau =

Hawaiian composer and musician

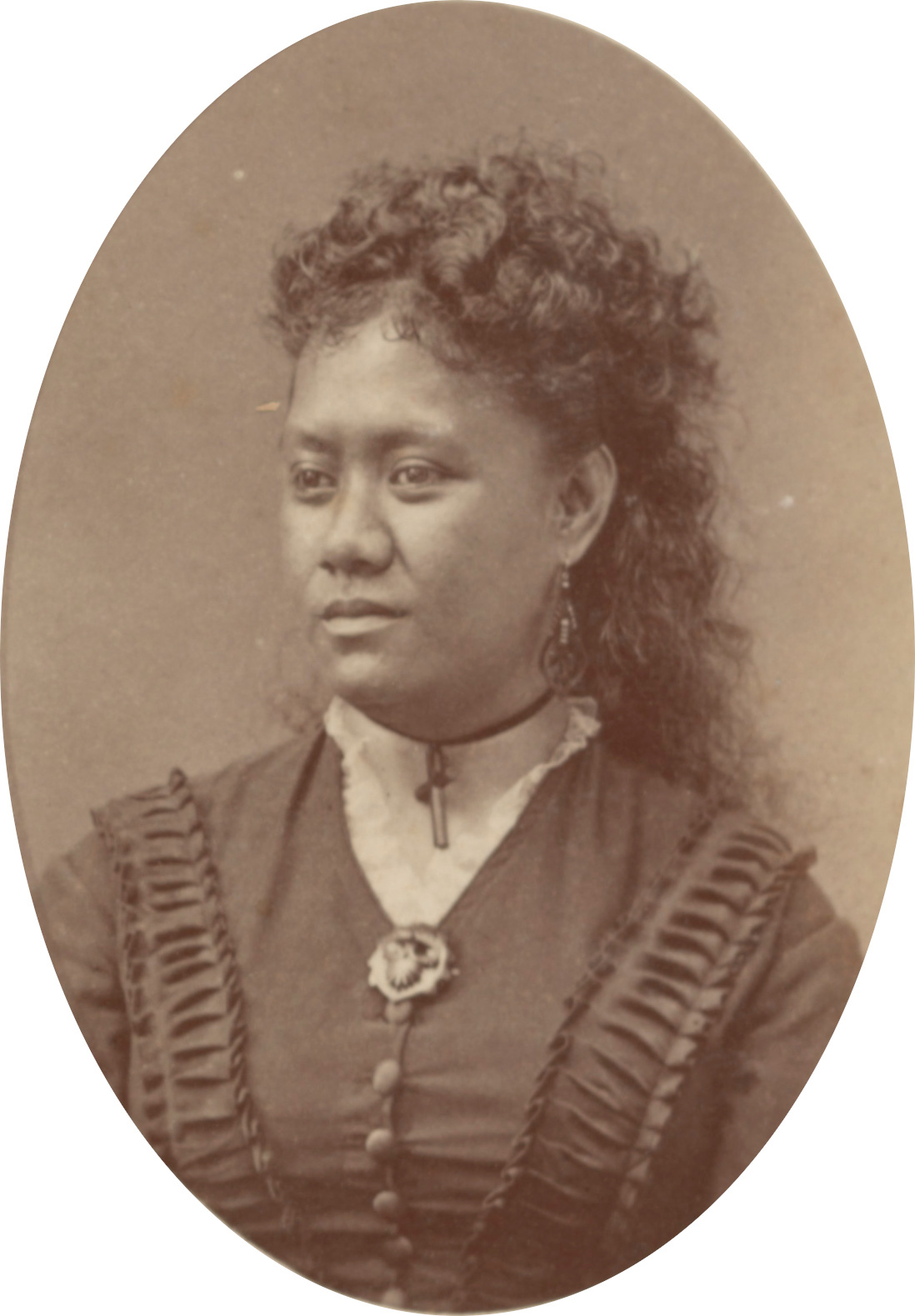
- Kapoli Kamakau, photograph by Menzies Dickson, c. 1880
- Born: c. 1851/1852
- Died: July 27, 1891; Kalaupapa, Molokai, Hawaiian Kingdom
- Parent: ʻUmi Kukaʻilani

Kapoli Kamakau (c. 1851/1852 – July 27, 1891), sometimes referred to as Lizzie Kapoli Kamakau, was a Hawaiian composer and musician who lived during the Hawaiian Kingdom. A close associate and friend of members of the Hawaiian royal family, she served as protège and lady-in-waiting to the future Queen Liliʻuokalani (r. 1891–1893). She was a member of the singing club organized by Liliʻuokalani and her sister Likelike, and wrote music compositions with the two royal sisters. In 1888, she contracted leprosy and was exiled to the leper colony of Kalaupapa. At the settlement, she is thought to have taught singing lessons to the female patients. She died in 1891 after Queen Liliʻuokalani's visit to Kalaupapa as part of her tours of the islands.

== Early life ==
Kapoli was born in either 1851 or 1852. Her father was ʻUmi Kukaʻilani (1833–1899). ʻUmi would later marry a patient at Kalaupapa named Hana.

Kapoli lived in the household of Bernice Pauahi Bishop, a high chiefess and member of Hawaiian royalty, and her husband, American businessman Charles Reed Bishop. She formed a close friendship with Princess Likelike and her sister, the future Queen Liliʻuokalani (r. 1891–1893), whom Kapoli served as a lady-in-waiting. Liliʻuokalani referred to her as Lizzie. A member of the Kaohuokalani Singing Club founded by Liliʻuokalani, she helped compose numerous songs with the two royal sisters. One of her first collaborative compositions was Liko Pua Lehua (Tender Leaves of the Lehua Flower). This tune was adapted from Thou E Ka Nani Mae ʻOle (Thou Art the Never Fading Beauty). After the death of Likelike in 1887, she composed kanikau (dirges, chants of mourning) with Eliza W. Holt and Liliʻuokalani. In May 1887, her letters indicate she wrote O Makalapua, in honor of Liliʻuokalani, and shared the lyrics and music notes with the then-princess while she was traveling to the Golden Jubilee of Queen Victoria.

In Hawaii's Story by Hawaii's Queen, Liliʻuokalani wrote of her relationship with two of her other Hawaiian protèges Eveline Townsend Wilson and Sophie Sheldon:

Mrs. Eveline Wilson from her childhood had professed a great fondness and love for me, and with two other young ladies, Lizzie Kapoli and Sophie Sheldon, had made my home theirs. Bright young girls, with happy hearts, and free from care and trouble, they made that part of my life a most delightful epoch to me.

In her will, Princess Keʻelikōlani, the largest landholder in Hawaii at the time, bequeathed two small pieces of property to Kapoli, who was at her bedside prior to her death. The first was one of the princess's house lot on Queen Street, Honolulu, and the second a piece of land called Kaʻala, near Joseph O. Carter's residence, for her lifetime. After the 1884 death of Bernice Pauahi Bishop, Kapoli was also provided with a monthly allowance of 40 dollars in her will.

== Exile to Kalaupapa ==
Liliʻuokalani recorded the event leading to Kapoli's exile for leprosy. Writing on January 22, 1888, Liliʻuokalani noted, “Recd letter from Kapoli telling me that she had been reported to board of health & perhaps will be sent to Kalawao. Poor Lizzie—sat thinking of her all evening and writing Music.” On March 1, 1888, Kapoli was admitted to Kakaʻako Branch Hospital for inspection. She successfully petitioned the governmental Board of Health for her father ʻUmi to accompany her to the colony as her kōkua (helper) on April 27. On May 1, she and 28 other individuals departed for the leper colony of Kalaupapa on Molokai. Liliʻuokalani's diary noted, "Went to Kakaako to bid Kapoli good bye."

Between Kapoli's admission to Kakaʻako and departure for Kalaupapa, Charles Reed Bishop, whose household Kapoli was once part of, wrote to Superintendent of Kalaupapa Rudolph Wilhelm Meyer and Minister of Interiors Lorrin A. Thurston about building a home (at his own expense) for female patients in the colony. Through the intercession of Bishop, the government built the Bishop Home (also sometimes called the Pauahi Home) to allow Kapoli and other young women and girls to reside away from the other patients. A "comfortable home" was built for Kapoli on the ground of the property while the construction began and Bishop wrote to Meyer that he was glad she was satisfied with the arrangement. In 1889, Mother Marianne Cope, Sisters Vincentia McCormick and Leopoldina Burns, three Catholic sisters of the Third Order of Saint Francis, were charged with the care of the patients at Bishop Home. Kapoli possibly taught singing to the girls at Bishop House and taught students how to play the organ at the Protestant church.

Researcher Colette Higgins noted that Liliʻuokalani visited Kapoli at Bishop House during her official tour of the islands as monarch on April 27, 1891. This was Liliʻuokalani's third time visiting the settlement but first as reigning monarch and the first after Kapoli's exile. The Hawaiian language newspaper Ka Nupepa Kuokoa reported, "The queen went down to see Kapoli... There was affection and tears falling onto the cheeks of Kapoli, since the queen was a close friend of hers a long time ago."

Kapoli died on July 27, 1891, at Kalaupapa, from influenza complicated by dysentery. She was buried at Kalaupapa. Her father and his second wife were later buried next to her.

== Bibliography ==
- Allen, Helena G. (1982). The Betrayal of Liliuokalani: Last Queen of Hawaii, 1838–1917. Glendale, CA: Arthur H. Clark Company. ISBN 978-0-87062-144-4. OCLC 9576325.
- Clark, John R. K. (2018). Kalaupapa Place Names: Waikolu to Nihoa. Honolulu: University of Hawaii Press. ISBN 978-0-8248-7330-1. OCLC 1031468801.
- Dill, Jan E. Hanohano (April 11, 2017). "Kalaupapa and its Legacy in Hawaiian Families: How Tragedy Begets Pride". At Low Tide.
- Forbes, David W., ed. (2003). Hawaiian National Bibliography, 1780–1900, Volume 4: 1881–1900. Vol. 4. Honolulu: University of Hawaii Press. ISBN 978-0-8248-2636-9. OCLC 123279964.
- Law, Anwei Skinsnes (2012). Kalaupapa: A Collective Memory (Ka Hokuwelowelo). Honolulu: University of Hawaii Press. ISBN 978-0-8248-6580-1. OCLC 830023588 – via Project MUSE.
- Higgins, Colette (December 2, 2019). Three Queens and the People of Kalaupapa. Kāneʻohe, HI: Windward Community College.
- Liliuokalani (1898). Hawaii's Story by Hawaii's Queen, Liliuokalani. Boston: Lee and Shepard. ISBN 978-0-548-22265-2. OCLC 2387226.
- Taylor, Albert Pierce (1922). Under Hawaiian Skies: A Narrative of the Romance, Adventure and History of the Hawaiian Islands. Honolulu: Advertiser Publishing Company, Ltd. OCLC 479709.
- Zambucka, Kristin (1977). The High Chiefess: Ruth Keelikolani. Honolulu: Mana Publishing Company. OCLC 3836213.
