= Leleiohoku II =

Prince of the Hawaiian Islands (1855–1877)

- Prince of the Hawaiian Islands
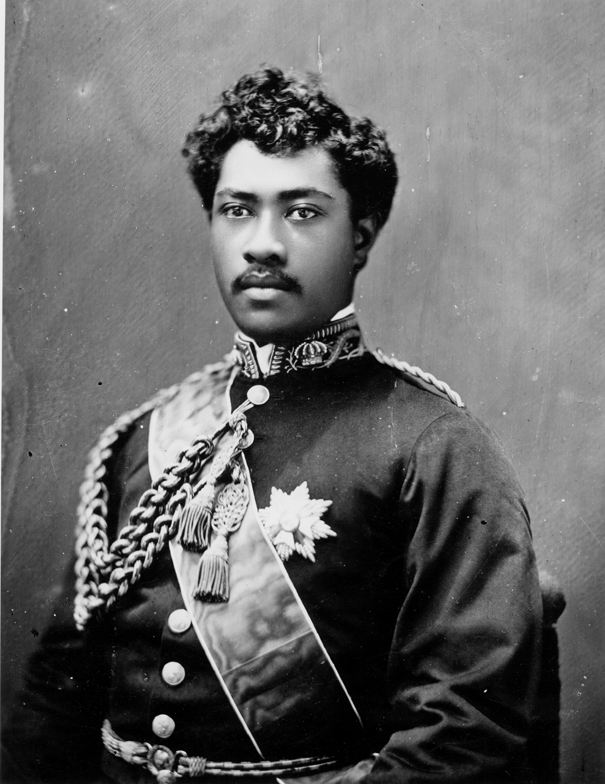
- Prince Leleiohoku, in military uniform, wearing the Royal Order of Kamehameha I, photograph by Menzies Dickson, c. 1874

Regent of the Kingdom of Hawaii
- Tenure: November 17, 1874 – February 15, 1875
- Monarch: Kalākaua
- Born: January 10, 1855; Honolulu, Oʻahu,
- Died: April 9, 1877 (aged 22) ʻIolani Palace, Honolulu, Oʻahu,
- Burial: April 25, 1877; Mauna ʻAla Royal Mausoleum
Names
- William Pitt Leleiohoku II Kalahoʻolewa
- House: House of Kalākaua
- Father: Caesar Kaluaiku Kapaʻakea
- Mother: Analea Keohokālole; Ruth Keʻelikōlani (hānai)
- Religion: Church of Hawaii

William Pitt Leleiohoku II, born Kalahoʻolewa (January 10, 1855 – April 9, 1877), was a prince of the Hawaiian Kingdom and member of the reigning House of Kalākaua.

At birth, Leleiohoku was hānai (informally adopted) by Ruth Keʻelikōlani and later legally adopted by her in 1862 as the heir to her vast land holdings. He was educated at St. Alban's College, a precursor of the present ʻIolani School. After finishing his education, he worked in the governmental Foreign Office and served as an officer on the personal military staff of King Lunalilo. On February 14, 1874, his brother Kalākaua was elected king after the death of Lunalilo. Declared heir apparent to his childless brother, Leleiohoku was expected to inherit the throne of Hawaii. He also served as a Privy Councilor and member of the House of Nobles in the Legislature of the Kingdom of Hawaii.

During Kalākaua's trip to the United States to negotiate the Reciprocity Treaty of 1875, Leleiohoku ruled as regent from November 17, 1874, to February 15, 1875. He died at the age of 22 from rheumatic fever resulting in the proclamation of his sister Liliʻuokalani as the next heir to the throne. Leleiohoku and his siblings are honored by the Hawaiian Music Hall of Fame as Na Lani ʻEhā (The Heavenly Four) for their patronage and enrichment of Hawaii's musical culture and history. An accomplished musical composer, Leleiohoku is remembered for composing many folk songs including "Kāua I Ka Huahuaʻi", which was adapted into the popular American song "Hawaiian War Chant".

== Early life and family ==
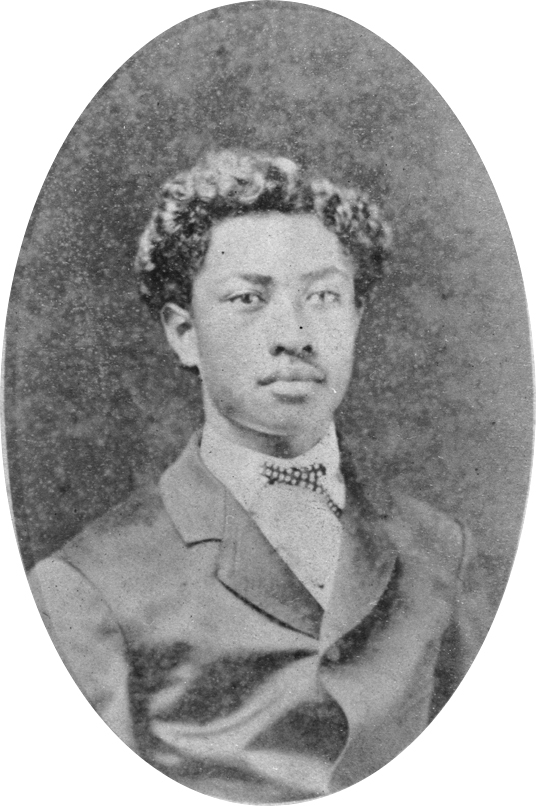
Leleiohoku at the age of fifteen, c. 1870.

Leleiohoku was born on January 10, 1855, in Honolulu on the island of Oʻahu, to Analea Keohokālole and Caesar Kapaʻakea. According to Hawaiian custom, he was named after an event linked to his birth. He was given the name Kalahoʻolewa, meaning "the day of the funeral" in the Hawaiian language, after the royal funeral of King Kamehameha III which occurred on the same day as his birth. Kapaʻakea and Keohokālole were political advisors to Kamehameha III and later to his successor Kamehameha IV. His mother was the daughter of ʻAikanaka and Kamaʻeokalani while his father was the son of Kamanawa II (half-brother of ʻAikanaka) and Kamokuiki. Their family were of the aliʻi class of the Hawaiian nobility and were collateral relations of the reigning House of Kamehameha, sharing common descent from the 18th-century aliʻi nui (supreme monarch) Keaweʻīkekahialiʻiokamoku. From his parents, he also descended from Keaweaheulu and Kameʻeiamoku, two of the five royal counselors of Kamehameha I during his conquest of the Kingdom of Hawaii. Kameʻeiamoku, the grandfather of both her mother and father, was depicted, along with his royal twin Kamanawa, on the Hawaiian coat of arms. Leleiohoku and his siblings traced their high rank from their mother's line of descent. They referred to themselves as members the "Keawe-a-Heulu line", although later historians would refer to the family as the House of Kalākaua.

The youngest surviving child of a large family, his biological siblings included: James Kaliokalani, David Kalākaua, Liliʻuokalani, Anna Kaʻiulani, Kaʻiminaʻauao, and Miriam Likelike. He and his siblings were hānai (informally adopted) to other family members. The Hawaiian custom of hānai is an informal form of adoption between extended families practiced by Hawaiian royals and commoners alike. Shortly after his birth, he became the hānai son of Princess Ruth Keʻelikōlani. She renamed him after her deceased first husband High Chief William Pitt Leleiohoku, the son of Prime Minister Kalanimoku. The English name "William Pitt" was originally chosen by Kalanimoku in honor of the British Prime Minister William Pitt the Younger. The Hawaiian name Leleiohoku means "Fled in the time of Hoku" and commemorates the day Kamehameha I died on the Hawaiian calendar in 1819. Keʻelikōlani was the half-sister of King Kamehameha IV and his successor Kamehameha V and served as the Governess of the island of Hawaii. She lost both her first husband in 1848 and their only surviving son John William Pitt Kīnaʻu in 1859. In 1862, through her second marriage with Isaac Young Davis, she gave birth to another son named Keolaokalani, who she gave to her cousin Bernice Pauahi Bishop in hānai just hours after his birth. This action infuriated her half-brother Kamehameha V who wanted the child as a potential heir. He demanded Keʻelikōlani to legally adopt Leleiohoku and give Keolaokalani in legal adoption to Pauahi. Thus, Leleiohoku became heir to her vast holding of most of the Kamehameha lands which only increased after the deaths of her half-brothers. In her 1898 memoir Hawaii's Story by Hawaii's Queen, her sister Liliʻuokalani described the event surrounding the drama:

This intelligence was extremely unpleasant to the prince, and he at once declared that he would never have anything to do with that child. He carried his purpose into immediate execution by insisting within a week from that time that his sister Ruth should legally adopt as her own my brother Leleiohoku, whom she had taken from his parents at birth. He then made out two instruments of adoption for his sister to sign. By one she gave her child to Mrs. Bishop irrevocably, cutting it off from all interest in her property, and by the other she adopted as her child and heir, William Pitt Leleiohoku, the second of that name. All the papers were carefully drawn up by the prince, and everything connected with the adoption was made complete, so that in no event could the legality of my brother's position be doubted. The innocent cause of this disturbance, the child thus adopted by Mrs. Bishop and named Keolaokalani, died in about six months...

== Education and early career ==
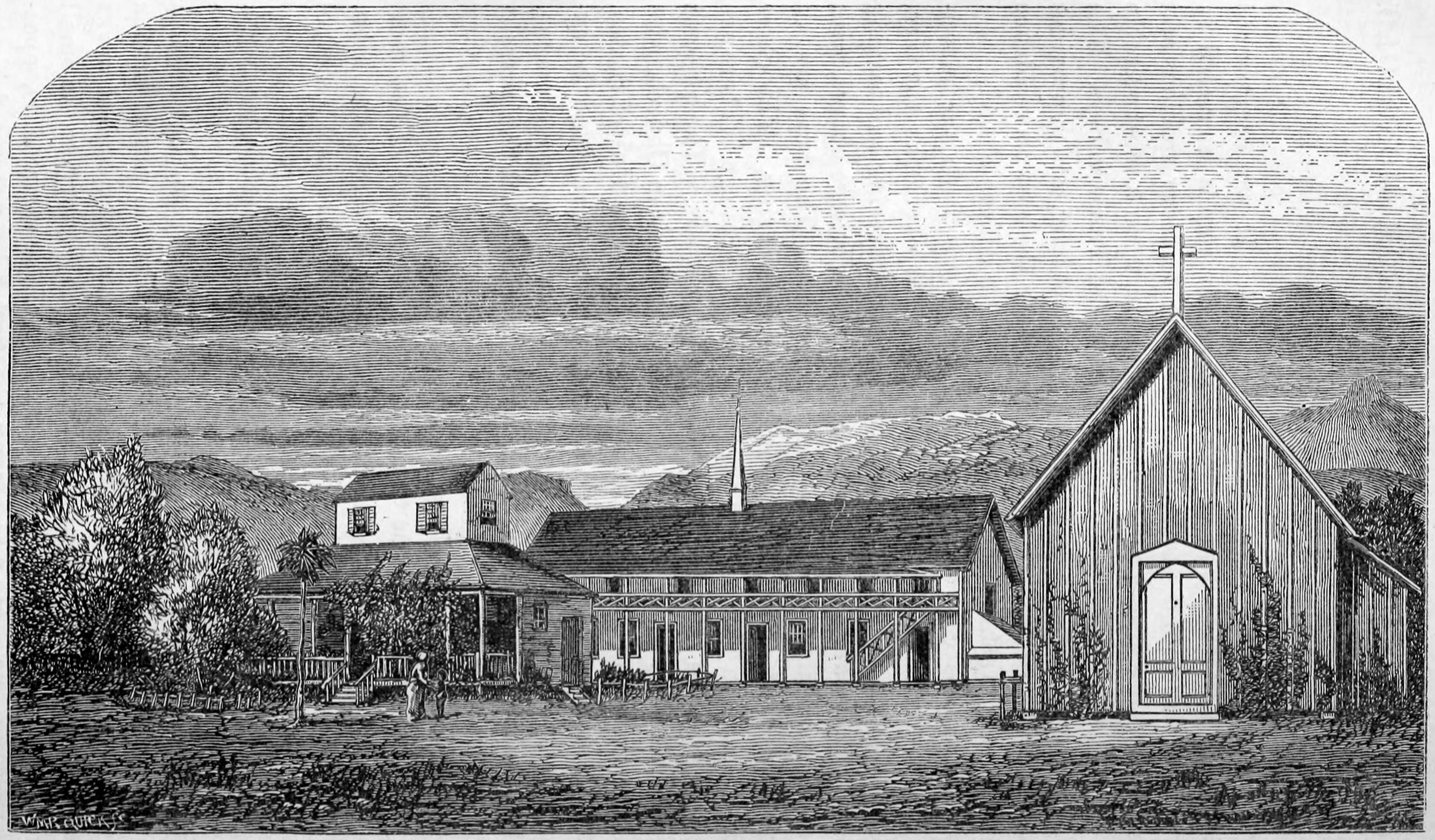
St. Alban's College, Honolulu, 1866

Leleiohoku was educated at the St. Alban's College established by the Anglican Church of Hawaii in Honolulu. Founded by Bishop Thomas Nettleship Staley and his assistants Archdeacon George Mason and Reverend Edmund Ibbotson, the school was located in the Pauoa Valley on Oahu. In 1863, the school was relocated and merged with the Luaʻehu School in Lahaina, Maui, established by the Anglican Reverend William R. Scott and later administered by Archdeacon Mason. (Note: His obituaries do not state if Leleiohoku attended the relocated school on Maui with Iaukea only that he attended St. Alban's College.) In 1870, the school was relocated back to its original site on Oahu. These institutions were the precursors of the present ʻIolani School in Honolulu. He was taught by Ibbotson and later Alatau T. Atkinson who became principal of the school after the departure of Bishop Staley. At the school, he developed a friendship with Curtis P. Iaukea, a royal retainer of King Kamehameha IV. Their bond was later compared to the friendship of Damon and Pythias. Some of his other classmates included Samuel Nowlein and Robert Hoapili Baker, both of whom were politicians in later life.

Upon completing his formal education at St. Alban's in 1872, Leleiohoku served as a clerk in the Foreign Office. In this capacity, he worked and was taught governmental affairs by William Jarrett, the Chief Clerk and Secretary of the Foreign Office.

When King Kamehameha V died in 1872 with no heir, the 1864 Constitution of the Kingdom of Hawaii called for the legislature to elect the next monarch. By both popular vote and the unanimous vote in the legislature, Lunalilo became the first elected king of Hawaii. On January 25, 1873, the new king commissioned Leleiohoku as major of the military staff of the Governor of Oahu under his brother-in-law John Owen Dominis. His brother Kalākaua was appointed as a colonel on the king's personal military staff around the same time. Although the kingdom had an army, it was composed of the King's Royal Guards and volunteer companies.

== Heir to the throne ==
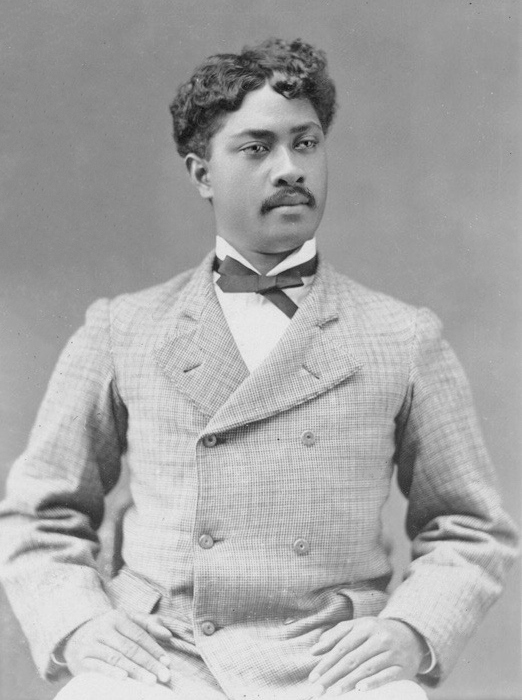
Prince Leleiohoku, photograph by Menzies Dickson, c. 1874–77

Lunalilo died without an heir in 1874. In the election that followed, Leleiohoku's brother, David Kalākaua, ran against Emma, the dowager queen of Kamehameha IV. On February 12, 1874, the legislative assembly voted thirty-nine to six in favor of Kalākaua over Emma. The legislature's choice of Kalākaua and the subsequent announcement caused a riot at the courthouse. To quell the civil disruption, American and British troops were landed from three warships in the harbor with the permission of the Hawaiian government, and the rioters were arrested. Plans were discussed to marry Leleiohoku to Queen Emma, who was eighteen years his senior; she refused such a match.

After the 1874 election, King Kalākaua concerned himself with establishing a line of succession to the throne since he and his wife Kapiʻolani were childless. In the absence of legitimate children, Article 22 of the 1864 Constitution gave the monarch the power to appoint a successor or heir with the consent of the House of Nobles. Thus, Leleiohoku was named the heir apparent to the throne and publicly proclaimed as such on February 14, 1874. He was also granted the title of Prince and style of "His Royal Highness". King Kalākaua also gave royal titles and styles to their sisters, Princess Lydia Kamakaʻeha Dominis and Princess Miriam Likelike Cleghorn.

He also became a member of the Privy Council of State, an advisory body for the king, and the House of Nobles, the upper chamber of the legislature. He sat in on, and participated in, the legislative assembly of 1876 during the regular session from April 29 to September 30. Kalākaua went on a state visit the United States from 1874 to 1875 to negotiate the Reciprocity Treaty of 1875, becoming the first reigning monarch to do so. While the king was absent, Leleiohoku ruled as regent from November 17, 1874, to February 15, 1875.

An accomplished musician, Leleiohoku founded several royal choral societies including the Kawaihau Glee Club. During the regency period, Leleiohoku’s group would compete with the singing troupes organized by his sisters Liliʻuokalani and Likelike. In later life, Liliʻuokalani admitted that "those of Prince Leleiohoku were really in advance of those of his two sisters, although perhaps this was due to the fact that the singing-club of the regent was far superior to any that we could organize; it consisted in a large degree of the very purest and sweetest male voices to be found amongst the native Hawaiians."

From 1874 to 1890, the Leleiohoku Guards, which Prince Leleiohoku gave his name, was formed as a volunteer company of cavalry in the army of the Kingdom of Hawaii. Leleiohoku served as the captain of this regiment during his lifetime. The ranks of this regiment, along with the other known volunteer companies, were composed mainly of Hawaiian and part-Hawaiian officers with a few white officers. Each unit was subject to call for active service when necessary. An 1888 military act passed by the legislature reduced the size of the army to four volunteer companies: the Honolulu Rifles, the King's Own, the Queen's Own, the Prince's Own, and the Leleiohoku Guard. In 1890, another military act further restricted the army to just the King's Royal Guards effectively abolishing the Leleiohoku Guards.

== Death and funeral ==
For the last two months of his life, Leleiohoku suffered from acute rheumatic fever and was bedridden for the final three or four weeks. The Hawaiian Gazette, noted that he was "often suffering intense pain, but no fears of any fatal result had been entertained until the day preceding his death, when his symptom became more unfavorable." Treated by doctors, he was expected to recover until his symptoms worsened. Leleiohoku died at ʻIolani Palace, at 12:40 am, on April 10, 1877, at the age of 22. The ultimate cause of death was rheumatic fever to the heart. The firing of minute guns from the Punchbowl Battery in the morning announced the prince's death to an unexpecting public. HMS Fantome, anchored in Honolulu Harbor, flew the Hawaiian flag at half-mast. His niece Princess Kaʻiulani would also die of rheumatic fever in the joints in 1899. This has led historians to believe the family may have been more susceptible to streptococcal infections (specifically, group A β-hemolytic streptococcus) because of their Polynesian blood.

Because Leleiohoku was unmarried and had no children, his brother King Kalākaua named their sister Liliʻuokalani as his heir apparent. Leleiohoku's hānai mother, Keʻelikōlani, wanted to be named heir, but the king's cabinet ministers objected as that would place Bernice Pauahi Bishop, her first cousin, next in line.

After his funeral, Leleiohoku was buried in the Royal Mausoleum at Mauna ʻAla on April 25, 1874. His coffin was placed next to those of his parents Kapaʻakea and Keohokālole. On June 24, 1910, in a ceremony officiated by his sister Queen Liliʻuokalani, his and his family's remains were transferred to the underground Kalākaua Crypt after the main mausoleum building was converted into a chapel.

== Legacy ==
Leleiohoku's death was greatly mourned by the nation since high hopes and anticipations were placed on him as the future monarch of Hawaii. The United States Minister to Hawaii Henry A. Peirce commented on Leleiohoku's prospect as ruler: "Of correct morals, well-educated and accomplished, the late prince promised to become, had he lived to ascend the throne, a wise and popular sovereign."

In 1875, the Hawaiian postal service issued a twelve cent, black on white postage stamp featuring a portrait of Leleiohoku in uniform. The stamp was created to meet the requirements of the postal convention made with the New South Wales government in 1874. A mauve variation of the stamp was issued in 1883. Both varieties were in use until the Republic of Hawaii in 1894.

Leleiohoku's life was dramatized in Almost a King by local Hawaiian playwright Clarence Waipa, which originally premiered in 1979 as the first act of a trilogy at St. Joseph High School in Hilo. The trilogy consists of Almost a King produced in 1979, Liliʻu E, produced in 1982 and Kaʻiulani, produced in 1986. This play was combined with Kaʻiulani, forming the first act of Ka ʻIu O Hoku by the Kamehameha Schools Hawai'i High School Hō'ike in 2017.

=== Compositions ===
Coming from a family of composers, Leleiohoku was regarded as the most talented of the four royal siblings. Historian George Kanahele said, "In composition, he was well advanced of Likelike and Liliʻuokalani". Today, Leleiohoku and his siblings are recognized by the Hawaiian Music Hall of Fame as Na Lani ʻEhā (The Heavenly Four) for their patronage and enrichment of Hawaii's musical culture and history.

Influenced by Henri Berger, the bandmaster of the Royal Hawaiian Band, Leleiohoku learned from and adapted elements of the folk tunes of visiting merchants, sailors and foreign settlers of Hawaii into his compositions. Leleiohoku was also an expert guitarist. More influenced by secular topics than his other siblings, Leleiohoku composed many love songs including "Adios Ke Aloha", regarded as his best composition, and "Moani Ke Ala". One of his compositions, "Kāua I Ka Huahuaʻi", was adapted by Johnny Noble into the popular American song, "Hawaiian War Chant".

His sister Liliʻuokalani wrote in her memoir, Hawaii’s Story by Hawaii’s Queen:

He was a very popular young man, about twenty years of age, having been born on the 10th of January, 1854 g[sic]. But the amiable prince was not to live to ascend the throne, or even for any extended enjoyment of those social pleasures in which he bore so prominent a part. He died on the 10th of April, 1877, having been in the position of heir apparent for about three years. He had the same love of music, the like passion for poetry and song, which have been so great a pleasure to me in my own life, as well as to our brother, King Kalakaua. He had a taste for social pleasures, and enjoyed the gay and festive element of life. During the absence of the king, there were three separate clubs or musical circles engaged in friendly rivalry to outdo each other in poetry and song. These were the friends and associates of the prince regent, those of the Princess Likelike, and my own friends and admirers. Our poems and musical compositions were repeated from one to another, were sung by our friends in the sweetest rivalry, and their respective merits extolled: but candor compels me to acknowledge that those of Prince Leleiohoku were really in advance of those of his two sisters, although perhaps this was due to the fact that the singing-club of the regent was far superior to any that we could organize; it consisted in a large degree of the very purest and sweetest male voices to be found amongst the native Hawaiians. They were all fine singers, and these songs, in which our musical circles then excelled, are to be heard amongst our people to the present day.

== Honours ==
- Knight Grand Cross of the Most Noble Order of Kamehameha I.
- Knight Grand Cross of the Royal Order of Kalākaua I.

== Ancestry ==
Ancestors of Leleiohoku II

8. High Chief Kepoʻokalani
4. High Chief Kamanawa II
9. High Chiefess Alapaʻiwahine
2. High Chief Caesar Kapaʻakea
10. High Chief Kanepawale
5. High Chiefess Kamokuiki
11. High Chiefess Uaua
1. William Pitt Leleiohoku II
12. High Chief Kepoʻokalani (= 8)
6. High Chief ʻAikanaka
13. High Chiefess Keohohiwa
3. High Chiefess Analea Keohokālole
14. High Chief Kahoalani Eia
7. High Chiefess Kamaʻeokalani
15. High Chiefess Keakaula

Kalākaua family tree

Key- (k)= Kane (male/husband)
(w)= wahine (female/wife)
Subjects with bold titles, lavender highlighted, bold box= Direct bloodline
Bold title, bold, grey box= Aunts, uncles, cousins line
Bold title, bold white box= European or American (raised to aliʻi status by marriage or monarch's decree)
Regular name and box= makaʻāinana or untitled foreign subject

Kāneikaiwilani (k)
Lonoikahaupu (k)
Keawepoepoe (k)
Kameʻeiamoku (k)
Kepoʻokalani (k)
Kamanawa II (k)
Kapaʻakea (1815–1866)
Kaliokalani (1835–1852)

Kanalohanaui (k)	Keākealani (w)	Ahu-a-ʻI (k)	Piʻilani (w) II	Moana (k)
Kalanikauleleiaiwi (w)	Kauauaʻamahi (k)	Keawe II (k)	Lonomaʻaikanaka (w)	Kauhiahaki (k)	ʻIliki-ā-Moana (w)
Kanoena (w)	Haʻaeamahi (k)	Kekelakekeokalani (w)	Alapaʻi Nui (k)	Keaka (w)	Keeaumoku Nui (k)	Kamakaimoku (w)	Kaeamamao (k) (Note: Genealogy of Liliuokalani, page 400, appendix B, No. 2 Queen of Hawaii, Liliuokalani (1898). Hawaii's Story by Hawaii's Queen. University of Hawaii Press. p. 400. "Kapaakea genealogy.")	Kaolanialiʻi (w)
Kamakaʻeheikuli (w)	Keōua (k)	Kahekili II (k)	Kekuiapoiwa II (w)	Ikuaʻana (w)	Heulu (k)	Moana (w)	Keaweʻopala (k)	Nohomualani (k)
Keaweaheulu (k)	Ululani (w)	Hakau (w)	Kanaʻina (k)	Kauwa (w)	Eia (k)
Alapai (w)	Keohohiwa (w)	Keōpūolani (w)	Kamehameha I	Kalaniʻōpuʻu (k)	Kānekapōlei (w)	Kiʻilaweau (k)	Nāhiʻōleʻa (k)	Kahoʻowaha II (w)	Inaina (w)
Hao (K)	Kailipakalua (w)
Kamokuiki (w)	ʻAikanaka (k)	Kamaeokalani (w)	Kaōleiokū (k)	Keoua (w)	Luahine (w)	Kalaʻimamahu	Kaheiheimālie
Kamehameha II	Kamehameha III	Kekūanaōʻa (k)	Kahalaiʻa; Luanuʻu (k)	Pauahi (w)	Kīnaʻu (w)	Pākī (k)	Kōnia (w)	Kanaʻina II	Kaʻahumanu III
Keohokālole (1816–1869)	Keʻelikōlani (w)	Kamehameha IV	Kamehameha V	Kaʻahumanu IV	Pauahi Bishop (w)	Bishop (k)	Lunalilo (k)
Kalākaua (1836–1891)	Kapiʻolani (1834–1899)	Liliʻuokalani (1838–1917)	Dominis (1832–1891)	Kaʻiulani (1842–?)	Kaʻiminaʻauao (1845–1848)	Cleghorn (1835–1910)	Likelike (1851–1887)	Leleiohoku II (1854–1877)
Kaʻiulani (1875–1899)

== Bibliography ==
- Allen, Helena G. (1982). The Betrayal of Liliuokalani: Last Queen of Hawaii, 1838–1917. Glendale, CA: Arthur H. Clark Company. ISBN 978-0-87062-144-4. OCLC 9576325.
- Archer, Seth (2018). Sharks upon the Land: Colonialism, Indigenous Health, and Culture in Hawai'i, 1778–1855. Cambridge: Cambridge University Press. ISBN 978-1-316-80064-5.
- Blount, James Henderson (1895). The Executive Documents of the House of Representatives for the Third Session of the Fifty-Third Congress, 1893–'94 in Thirty-Five Volumes. Washington, D.C.: US Government Printing Office. OCLC 191710879.
- Cooke, Amos Francis (1913). "The Story of Hawaiian Stamps (Continued)". The Mid-Pacific Magazine. Honolulu: T. H., A. H. Ford; Pan-Pacific Union, Pan-Pacific Research Institution. pp. 451–456. OCLC 45158315.
- Dabagh, Jean; Lyons, Curtis Jere; Hitchcock, Harvey Rexford (1974). Dabagh, Jean (ed.). "A King is Elected: One Hundred Years Ago" (PDF). The Hawaiian Journal of History. 8. Honolulu: Hawaiian Historical Society: 76–89. hdl:10524/112. OCLC 60626541.
- Dole, Charles S. (October 15, 1929). "The Hui Kawaihau". Papers of the Hawaiian Historical Society. 16. Honolulu: Hawaiian Historical Society: 8–15. hdl:10524/978. OCLC 528831753.
- Dukas, Neil Bernard (2004). A Military History of Sovereign Hawaiʻi. Honolulu: Mutual Publishing Company. ISBN 978-1-56647-636-2. OCLC 56195693.
- Forbes, David W., ed. (2001). Hawaiian National Bibliography, 1780–1900, Volume 3: 1851–1880. Vol. 3. Honolulu: University of Hawaii Press. ISBN 978-0-8248-2503-4. OCLC 123279964.
- Gregg, David L. (1982). King, Pauline (ed.). The Diaries of David Lawrence Gregg: An American Diplomat in Hawaii, 1853–1858. Honolulu: Hawaiian Historical Society. ISBN 9780824808617. OCLC 8773139.
- Haley, James L. (2014). Captive Paradise: A History of Hawaii. New York: St. Martin's Press. ISBN 978-0-312-60065-5. OCLC 865158092.
- Hawaii (1918). Lydecker, Robert Colfax (ed.). Roster Legislatures of Hawaii, 1841–1918. Honolulu: Hawaiian Gazette Company. OCLC 60737418.
- Iaukea, Curtis Piehu; Watson, Lorna Kahilipuaokalani Iaukea (1988). Schweizer, Niklaus R. (ed.). By Royal Command: The Official Life and Personal Reminiscences of Colonel Curtis Piehu Iaukea at the Court of Hawaii's Rulers. Honolulu: Hui Hanai. ISBN 978-0-9616738-6-4. OCLC 16006083.
- Kaeo, Peter; Queen Emma (1976). Korn, Alfons L. (ed.). News from Molokai, Letters Between Peter Kaeo & Queen Emma, 1873–1876. Honolulu: The University Press of Hawaii. hdl:10125/39980. ISBN 978-0-8248-0399-5. OCLC 2225064.
- Kam, Ralph Thomas (2017). Death Rites and Hawaiian Royalty: Funerary Practices in the Kamehameha and Kalakaua Dynasties, 1819–1953. S. I.: McFarland, Incorporated, Publishers. ISBN 978-1-4766-6846-8. OCLC 966566652.
- Kamakau, Samuel (1992) [1961]. Ruling Chiefs of Hawaii (Revised ed.). Honolulu: Kamehameha Schools Press. ISBN 0-87336-014-1. OCLC 25008795.
- Kanahele, George S. (1999). Emma: Hawaii's Remarkable Queen. Honolulu: University of Hawaii Press. ISBN 978-0-8248-2240-8. OCLC 40890919.
- Kanahele, George S. (1979). Hawaiian Music and Musicians: An Illustrated History. University Press of Hawaii. ISBN 978-0-8248-0578-4. OCLC 903648649.
- Kanahele, George S. (2002) [1986]. Pauahi: The Kamehameha Legacy. Honolulu: Kamehameha Schools Press. ISBN 978-0-87336-005-0. OCLC 173653971.
- Kuykendall, Ralph Simpson (1953). The Hawaiian Kingdom 1854–1874, Twenty Critical Years. Vol. 2. Honolulu: University of Hawaii Press. ISBN 978-0-87022-432-4. OCLC 47010821.
- Kuykendall, Ralph Simpson (1967). The Hawaiian Kingdom 1874–1893, The Kalakaua Dynasty. Vol. 3. Honolulu: University of Hawaii Press. ISBN 978-0-87022-433-1. OCLC 500374815.
- Liliuokalani (1898). Hawaii's Story by Hawaii's Queen, Liliuokalani. Boston: Lee and Shepard. ISBN 978-0-548-22265-2. OCLC 2387226.
- Mcdermott, John F.; Choy, Zita Cup; Guerrero, Anthony P. S. (2015). "The Last Illness and Death of Hawaiʻi's King Kalākaua: A New Historical/Clinical Perspective Cover". The Hawaiian Journal of History. 49. Honolulu: Hawaiian Historical Society: 59–72. doi:10.1353/hjh.2015.0002. hdl:10524/56606. OCLC 60626541. S2CID 162545638 – via Project MUSE.
- Newbury, Colin (2001). "Patronage and Bureaucracy in the Hawaiian Kingdom, 1840–1893". Pacific Studies. 24 (1–2). Laie, HI: Brigham Young University, Hawaii Campus: 1–38. ISSN 0275-3596. OCLC 193272210. Archived from the original on April 15, 2012.
- Osorio, Jon Kamakawiwoʻole (2002). Dismembering Lāhui: A History of the Hawaiian Nation to 1887. Honolulu: University of Hawaii Press. ISBN 0-8248-2549-7. OCLC 48579247.
- Parker, David "Kawika" (2008). "Crypts of the Ali`i The Last Refuge of the Hawaiian Royalty". Tales of Our Hawaiʻi (PDF). Honolulu: Alu Like, Inc. OCLC 309392477. Archived from the original (PDF) on November 11, 2013.
- Pratt, Elizabeth Kekaaniauokalani Kalaninuiohilaukapu (1920). History of Keoua Kalanikupuapa-i-nui: Father of Hawaii Kings, and His Descendants, with Notes on Kamehameha I, First King of All Hawaii. Honolulu: Honolulu Star-Bulletin. OCLC 154181545.
- Restarick, Henry Bond (1924). Hawaii, 1778–1920, from the Viewpoint of a Bishop: Being the Story of English and American Churchmen in Hawaii with Historical Sidelights. Honolulu: Paradise of the Pacific. OCLC 1337282.
- Sebree, Shirley (1994). Pele's tears: reclaiming the lost gems of Hawaiian music in western music styles. New York: Vantage Press. ISBN 978-0-533-10631-8. OCLC 260209675.
- Soong, Irma Tam (1997). "Sun Yat-sen's Christian Schooling in Hawaiʻi". The Hawaiian Journal of History. 31. Honolulu: Hawaiian Historical Society: 151–178. hdl:10524/527. OCLC 60626541.
- Taylor, Albert Pierce (1922). Under Hawaiian Skies: A Narrative of the Romance, Adventure and History of the Hawaiian Islands. Honolulu: Advertiser Publishing Company, Ltd. OCLC 479709.
- Thrum, Thomas G., ed. (1875). "Hawaiian Register and Directory for 1875". Hawaiian Almanac and Annual for 1875. Honolulu: Honolulu Star-Bulletin. pp. 12–13. hdl:10524/664.
- Thrum, Thomas G., ed. (1876). "Hawaiian Register and Directory for 1876". Hawaiian Almanac and Annual for 1876. Honolulu: Honolulu Star-Bulletin. pp. 62–64. hdl:10524/665.
- Thrum, Thomas G., ed. (1877). "Hawaiian Register and Directory for 1877". Hawaiian Almanac and Annual for 1877. Honolulu: Honolulu Star-Bulletin. pp. 56–59. hdl:10524/658.
- Thrum, Thomas G., ed. (1878). "History and Description of Hawaiian Postage Stamps". Hawaiian Almanac and Annual for 1878. Honolulu: Honolulu Star-Bulletin. pp. 41–47. hdl:10524/667.
- Tranquada, Jim; King, John (2012). The ʻUkulele: A History. Honolulu: University of Hawaii Press. ISBN 978-0-8248-3544-6. OCLC 767806914 – via Project MUSE.
- "[Unknown]". Paradise of the Pacific. Vol. 45, no. 8. Honolulu: Press Publishing Co. August 1932. OCLC 6372692.
- Van Dyke, Jon M. (2008). Who Owns the Crown Lands of Hawaiʻi?. Honolulu: University of Hawaii Press. ISBN 978-0-8248-6560-3. OCLC 257449971 – via Project MUSE.
- Zambucka, Kristin (1977). The High Chiefess: Ruth Keelikolani. Honolulu: Mana Publishing Company. OCLC 3836213.
- Zambucka, Kristin (2002). Kalakaua: Hawaiʻi's Last King. Honolulu: Māna Publishing Company. ISBN 978-0-931897-04-7. OCLC 123305738.
