= George Healiʻi Kāhea Beckley =

Native Hawaiian British Army soldier

- Beckley in British Army uniform wearing his Military Medal, 1919
- Born: George Healiʻi Beckley Kāhea; May 5, 1886; Honolulu, Hawaiian Kingdom
- Died: April 15, 1921 (aged 34); Honolulu, Territory of Hawaii, United States
- Burial place: Oʻahu Cemetery, Honolulu
- Military career
- Allegiance: United Kingdom
- Branch: British Army
- Service years: 1914–1919
- Rank: Private
- Units: Liverpool Rifles; Royal Fusiliers
- Conflicts: World War I Allied intervention in the Russian Civil War
- Awards: Military Medal

George Healiʻi Kāhea Beckley MM (Hawaiian pronunciation: [heˌɐliʔi kəˈheɐ]; born George Healiʻi Beckley Kāhea; May 5, 1886 – April 15, 1921) was a Native Hawaiian soldier who served in the British Army during World War I and later in the Allied intervention in the Russian Civil War. A sailor before the war, he enlisted in Britain under the surname Beckley and served in France, Belgium and the Balkans, including with the Liverpool Rifles. He was wounded several times and received the Military Medal for his actions near Festubert during the Battle of the Lys in April 1918, where he helped repel German bombing attacks and carried a request for reinforcements under heavy fire while his battalion was isolated. After the armistice, he reenlisted in the Royal Fusiliers for service in North Russia. He returned to Hawaii in December 1919 and worked as an engineer in Honolulu until his accidental electrocution in 1921.

== Early life and family ==
Beckley was born at Honuakaha in Kakaʻako, Honolulu, on May 5, 1886, during the Hawaiian Kingdom. Honuakaha was one of the residences of King Kalākaua. (Note: His gravestone records 1888 as his birth year.) His family was of aliʻi descent, tracing ancestry through King Līloa of the island of Hawaii and King Kahekili II of Maui.

His parents were David Kaipeʻelua Kāhea and Maria Beckley Kāhea. Maria served in the Hawaiian royal court and was the first maid of honor and lady-in-waiting to Queen Kapiʻolani after the accession of King Kalākaua. Her grandfathers were Captain George Charles Beckley, an English sea captain and military adviser to Kamehameha I, and the High Chief Hoʻolulu. King Kalākaua bestowed the name Healiʻi on Beckley to commemorate the arrival of an invitation for the king to attend Golden Jubilee of Queen Victoria in 1887, shortly before Beckley's birth. The name means, "the invitation" or "the command", and was later associated with Beckley's response to Britain's call to arms during World War I. (Note: His given name is rendered as "Heaalii" in Edith Kawelohea McKinzie's compilation of genealogies extracted from Hawaiian-language newspapers. Three of Beckley's relatives also bore the name George: his uncle George Charles Moʻoheau Beckley Sr., and his first cousin George Charles Moʻoheau Beckley Jr. and his second cousin George Hoapili Beckley.) In 1893, when Beckley was six, his parents became kahu of the Royal Mausoleum at Mauna ʻAla in Nuʻuanu, where the family lived during his childhood. His siblings included Leander, Violet, Grace, Frederick and Benjamin.

In September 1901, Beckley and five other boys were brought before Judge William Luther Wilcox on gambling charges after police alleged that they habitually gambled in the streets around Pauoa Road and Nuuanu Street. Wilcox reprimanded the boys and released them, warning that a subsequent offense would result in heavy sentences.

From 1904 to 1906, Beckley served in Company H of the National Guard of Hawaii, receiving his first military training under Captain Benjamin Kanehi as part of the regiment commanded by Colonel John Walter Jones. (Note: The Honolulu Star-Advertiser reported in 1918 that both George and his younger brother Benjamin had served in the National Guard of Hawaii from 1904 to 1906. Benjamin's reported birth year of 1892, however, would have made him only about 12 to 14 years old during this period.)

Before the war, Beckley worked as a seaman aboard freighters of the American-Hawaiian Steamship Company, a major cargo line linking Hawaii and the Pacific Coast with the eastern United States. In the years before 1914 he left a vessel at Acapulco, worked on a ranch and spent about nine months with Mexican revolutionary forces commanded by generals associated with Victoriano Huerta, who later seized the Mexican presidency during the Mexican Revolution. He subsequently returned to sea.

== Military service ==
=== Enlistment and early service ===
The United States remained neutral until it entered World War I in April 1917, although many Americans volunteered for service in foreign armed forces before American entry into the conflict. At the outbreak of World War I, Beckley was serving aboard the steamship Missourian, which carried mules across the Atlantic. Another Hawaiian aboard the ship was his second cousin George Hoapili Beckley Jr., a member of another branch of the Beckley family, although the two men apparently did not know each other at the time. (Note: George Hoapili Beckley Jr., from Hāwī in Kohala, was Beckley's second cousin. He was descended from Captain George Charles Beckley through his youngest son, Captain George Hoapili Beckley. Contemporary wartime sources referred to him as George Hoapili Beckley and George Hoapili Beckley Jr. In 1919, Mary Jane Kekulani Montano referred to Hoapili as "George Hoapili III." A 1933 account styled him "George Beckley, IV" as the fourth George in his family line. In August 1917, the Honolulu Star-Advertiser included Beckley and Hoapili in a published list of one hundred volunteers for British service.) According to reports from 1918, Beckley and Hoapili left the Missourian in France and entered British service. After his return to Hawaii, Beckley gave a different account, saying that the ship returned to New York, where he took his discharge before crossing to Liverpool aboard a British vessel.

Beckley (back row, far right) with non-commissioned officers of his detachment in Flanders, 1916

In Liverpool, a recruiting officer initially rejected him after interpreting the surname Kahea as German. Beckley then applied under his maternal family name and told the recruiter that he was a Canadian from British Columbia. He later said that he disclosed that he was Hawaiian and American and had chosen the surname Beckley because of his English ancestry. Beckley attributed his decision to serve under the British flag to his English ancestor Captain Beckley, saying, "I wanted to fight under the British colors because my great grandfather was a Briton and was a soldier of another King George and of Kamehameha I". In a 1919 letter, he also expressed regret that Hawaii's First and Second Infantry regiments had not served in Europe, writing that he had hoped they would have an opportunity to "show what Hawaiians can really do."

British records subsequently identified him with Vancouver: the official announcement of his Military Medal listed him as "201704 Pte. G. Beckley, L'pool R. (Vancouver)", while a War Office casualty list recorded him as "G. Beckley" of Vancouver, Canada. Later records identify him in the 1/5th Battalion, King's (Liverpool Regiment), under service number 4198, before he was renumbered 201704. Beckley served as a rifleman with the Liverpool Rifles and later as a Lewis gunner. Contemporary Hawaiian newspapers sometimes described his unit as the "55th Lancashire" regiment or division, while the official gazette abbreviated his regiment as "L'pool R." He was sent to France in 1915 and recalled serving in the Somme region, around Arras, near Ypres and at Cambrai.

Newspaper accounts reported that Beckley was wounded four times, although they differed on the details of the wounds and dates. His 1919 account placed wounds to his left arm in May 1916, his right ankle near Arras on July 2, 1916, and his right buttock near Ypres in August 1917. He recalled spending 14 days in trenches near Ypres under shell fire and gas attacks and taking part in the offensive of July 31. In February 1917, Beckley was reported serving on the Balkan front against Bulgarian forces, where he unexpectedly met his cousin Hoapili at a military camp in Macedonia. Beckley was wounded in the shoulder and leg during the same engagement. (Note: Hawaiian-language coverage in Ka Nupepa Kuokoa also reported the cousins' wartime encounter, describing it as occurring in Romania.) He was later wounded while attempting to recover the body of his captain under fire and sent back to England.

After receiving no word from them for more than a year, relatives in Hawaii believed that Beckley and Hoapili might have been killed. At the end of 1918, Beckley's family received a souvenir booklet postmarked in England and signed only "Healii", the first indication in more than a year that he was alive. A letter dated December 22 from Cork, Ireland, reported that he was in good health, had been wounded four times and was awaiting discharge before returning home. A 1919 account stated that Beckley rose from private to corporal during his service with the King's Liverpool Regiment, although British records list his rank only as private.

His extended family also included several wartime servicemen. His brother Benjamin Pitman Kahea Beckley enlisted in Canada on April 4, 1918, initially joining an aviation unit before being transferred to ambulance service after reaching England. His cousin Henry Hoʻolulu Pitman Beckley served with the American Red Cross in Siberia as a captain of medical supply trains. (Note: In 1960, newspaper columnist Clarice B. Taylor erroneously stated that all three brothers: Frederick, Benjamin and George adopted the surname Beckley when they joined the British Army during World War I. Contemporary wartime accounts instead identify Frederick Malulani Kahea as living in Honolulu, where he received letters from his brothers serving overseas.) Other Native Hawaiians served overseas, including John Rupert Rowe, who was killed in action in France on July 31, 1918, and is regarded as the first Hawaiian combatant killed in the war.

=== Festubert and Military Medal ===
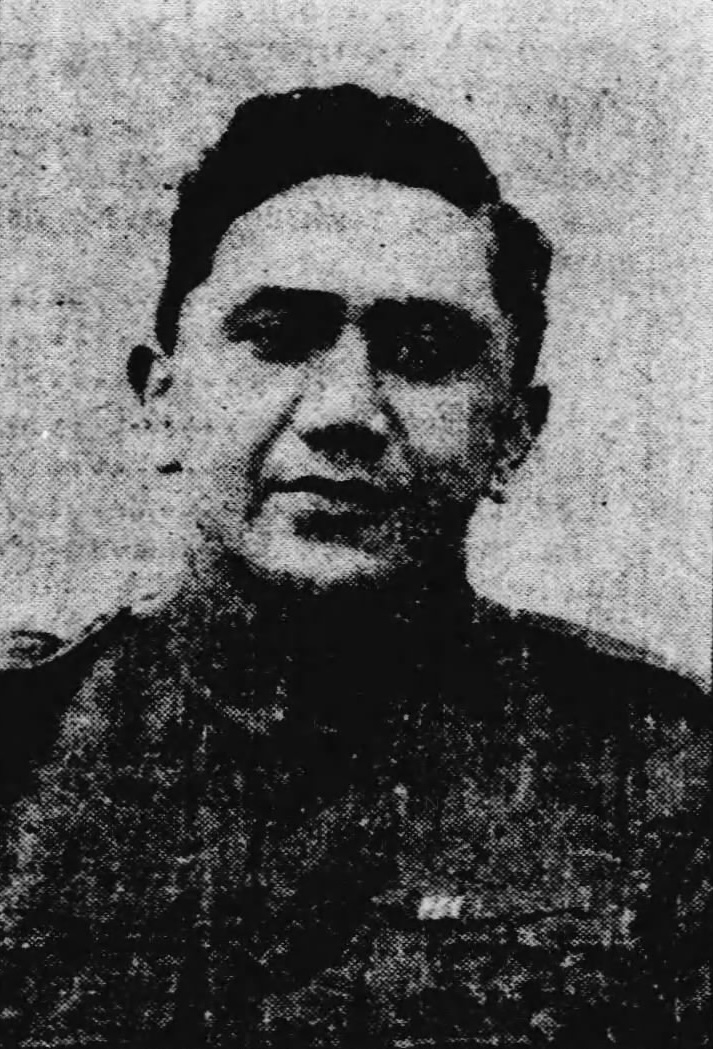
Beckley in a passport photograph taken in London, with the ribbon of his Military Medal visible on his left breast

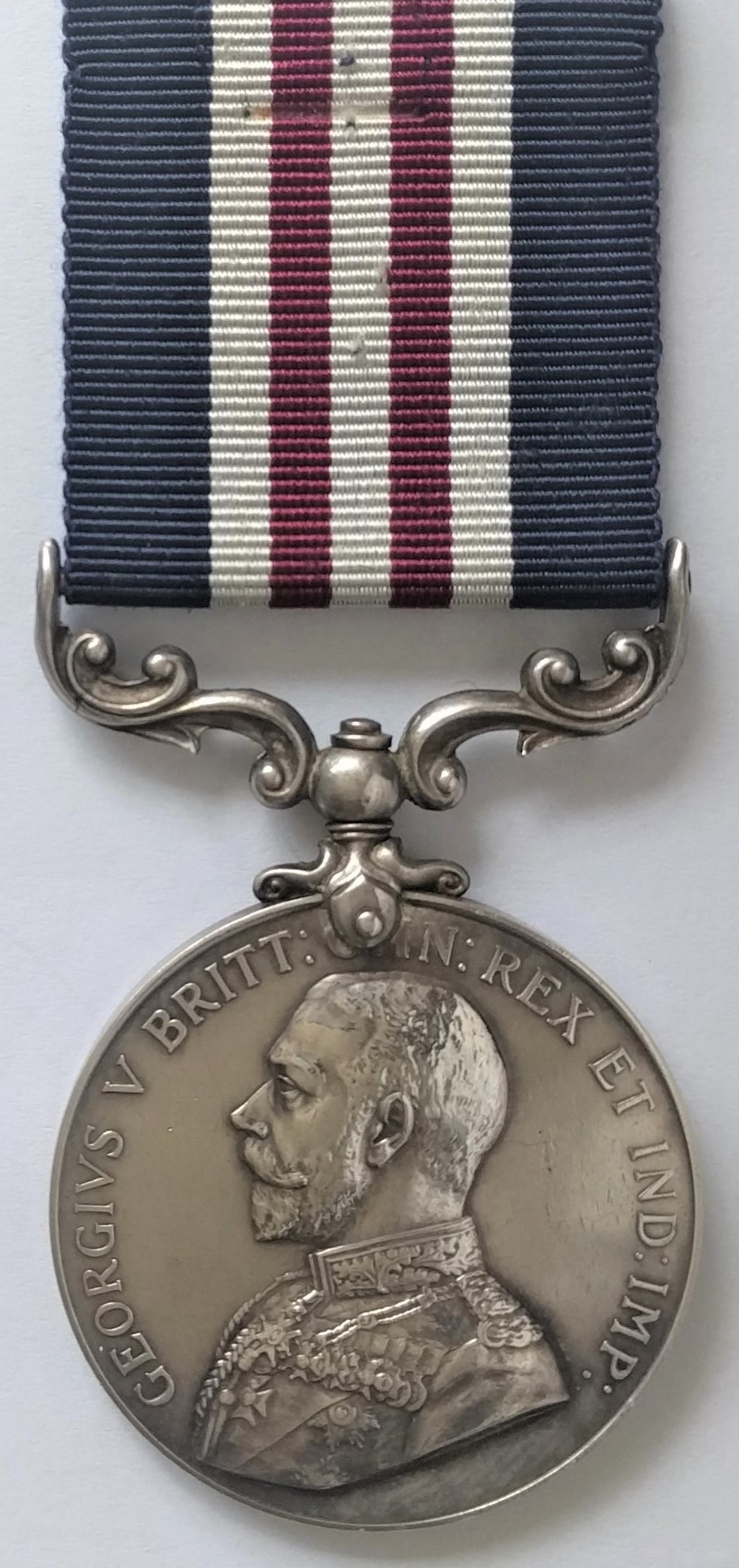
The Military Medal in the form awarded during the reign of George V

During the German spring offensive, Beckley fought with the 55th (West Lancashire) Division in the Givenchy–Festubert sector of the Battle of the Lys. When the German offensive in Flanders began on April 9, 1918, the division held a front extending from the La Bassée Canal to south of Richebourg-l'Avoué, where its line joined that of the Portuguese forces. After German troops broke through the Portuguese positions on its left, the division formed a defensive flank extending through Givenchy and Festubert toward Le Touret and held it through six days of fighting. The 1/5th Battalion of the King's Regiment (Liverpool) was attacked shortly before the 1/7th Battalion on the morning of April 9; amid heavy fog, the outpost line in front of Festubert was overrun by about 10:30 a.m.

Hawaiian newspaper accounts reported that Beckley's battalion became isolated during the fighting and was in danger of being overwhelmed. After two messengers sent across the battlefield to request assistance failed to return, Beckley volunteered to carry another request for reinforcements. He crossed about 400 yards under shell and machine-gun fire, alternately running and crawling, and delivered the message. On the return journey he was struck by shrapnel above the knee and knocked down, but continued back to his unit by limping and crawling. Reinforcements reached the isolated position, allowing the battalion to rejoin the regiment and take part in a counterattack against the German forces.

Beckley received the Military Medal for his actions during the fighting at Festubert. His original recommendation, dated May 10, 1918, credited him with helping repel two bombing attacks and "accounting for many Germans with his rifle" near Festubert from April 9 to 13. Major-General Hugh Jeudwine, commanding the 55th Division, recorded Beckley's gallant conduct at Festubert, while Lieutenant-General Richard Haking, commander of XI Corps, issued an order describing his gallantry and courage under heavy fire. The award was announced in the London Gazette on October 7, 1918, and repeated in the Edinburgh Gazette two days later, where he was listed as "201704 Pte. G. Beckley, L'pool R. (Vancouver)." Hawaiian newspaper accounts stated that King George V personally presented the medal to Beckley, with a 1921 account reporting that the king pinned it to his tunic.

In 1918, Beckley's cousin Mary Jane Kekulani Montano composed the mele Na Kamalei o Hawaii in honor of Hawaiians serving in the war. It was published in Ka Nupepa Kuokoa in January 1919 and later reprinted in Paradise of the Pacific with a dedication to Beckley and the men of Hawaii who had served in World War I.

=== North Russia and return to Hawaii ===
Beckley in British Army uniform wearing his Military Medal, in a photograph published in January 1920

Although Beckley expected to return home at the end of 1918, after the armistice he obtained permission to reenlist in the Royal Fusiliers for the Allied intervention in North Russia. A contemporary account reported that he was in a hospital when the armistice was signed but volunteered for the expedition. Having risen to corporal during his earlier service, he returned to the rank of private upon reenlisting. By 1919 he was serving with the 46th Royal Fusiliers in the Archangel region under service number GS/131324. Beckley later described the fighting between Archangel and areas farther south toward Petrograd as "fearful". He recalled fighting in snow and ice and instances in which Russian troops allied with the British defected to the Bolsheviks. He also recalled a Russian women's cavalry regiment fighting on the Allied side, describing its members as "real fighters". His regiment withdrew from North Russia in November 1919 and returned to London. Beckley was then sent to a repatriation camp and received documents providing for his return to the United States. After returning to Hawaii, Beckley remarked on the conflict between the White Army and Bolsheviks, "Oh, let them fight it out among themselves."

Beckley crossed from San Francisco to Hilo aboard the Enterprise and arrived in Honolulu on the Mauna Kea on December 30, 1919, after about five years away from Hawaii and in time to spend New Year's Day with his family. He arrived in civilian clothes and initially hoped to return unnoticed to his former home at the Royal Mausoleum grounds, but relatives and friends met him at the wharf and later persuaded him to put on his uniform. His uniform bore the Lancashire Roses and a "Star of Russia", along with an "L.G." insignia identifying him as a Lewis gunner. Four gold stripes represented his wounds, while four service stripes represented his years of service. After his arrival he visited Congressional Delegate Jonah Kūhiō Kalanianaʻole at his home in Waikīkī and Acting Governor Curtis P. Iaukea at the Capitol, both of whom congratulated him on his service. Beckley also said that, after hearing rumors while crossing the United States of a possible war with Mexico, he would enlist in the United States Army if war were declared. He continued to use the surname Beckley after returning to Hawaii and said that he intended to apply to the governor to have his wartime name formally perpetuated.

The Prince of Wales greeting Beckley during his visit to Honolulu on April 13, 1920

During the Prince of Wales's visit to Honolulu on April 13, 1920, Beckley joined other British veterans assembled to receive him at Honolulu Harbor after he came ashore from HMS Renown. As the prince inspected the veterans, he shook hands with each man and asked about their wartime service. Beckley, wearing his Military Medal, attracted particular attention. The prince stopped to speak with him at greater length and asked about his regiment, his military service and how he had received the medal. Their meeting was photographed, and an image of the prince greeting Beckley was published in the Honolulu Star-Advertiser the following day.

== Later life, death and funeral ==
Soon after returning to Honolulu, Beckley was employed as an engineer at the city pumping station at Marquesville, a historic neighborhood of Honolulu near Mānoa and Punahou. On April 15, 1921, he was found dead in the station's engine room after apparently coming into contact with a high-voltage electrical wire. A neighborhood girl or group of children discovered him, and burns were visible on his face and shoulders. It was suggested that he may have slipped and fallen against exposed wiring, although the precise circumstances were uncertain. He was unmarried.

Beckley's gravestone at Oʻahu Cemetery.

Beckley was accorded a military funeral on April 17. Major-General Charles G. Morton, commander of the United States Army's Hawaiian Department, ordered a military escort, firing squad and gun carriage for the funeral, while the Hawaiian Band canceled its regular Kapiolani Park engagement to participate. Fellow members of the Daughters and Sons of Hawaiian Warriors (Māmakakaua) maintained a vigil over his body in traditional regalia. Kāhili, spears and a pūloʻuloʻu (kapu stick) were placed around the casket, which was draped with the British flag and displayed his uniform cap and Military Medal.

Both houses of the Hawaii Territorial Legislature adjourned in Beckley's memory, and a legislative delegation attended the funeral. Following services at the Cathedral Basilica of Our Lady of Peace, the procession to Oʻahu Cemetery included British war veterans, the American Legion, the Veterans of Foreign Wars, a detachment and firing squad of the 27th U.S. Infantry, the 27th Infantry Band, the Hawaiian Band and members of the Daughters and Sons of Hawaiian Warriors. Official attendees included the British consul, Delegate and Princess Kalanianaʻole, Mayor John H. Wilson and representatives of the territorial government.

Nearly 1,000 people attended the funeral. Beckley was buried in the Beckley family plot near the grave of his ancestor Captain George Charles Beckley. The burial concluded with three rifle volleys and the sounding of taps. British officer veterans then approached the grave individually and saluted. Floral tributes were sent by Governor Charles J. McCarthy, the British consul, both houses of the territorial legislature, Delegate and Princess Kalanianaʻole and several veterans' organizations.

== Bibliography ==
=== Books and journals ===
- Coop, J. O. (1919). The Story of the 55th (West Lancashire) Division. Liverpool: Liverpool Daily Post Printers.
- Gregson, Adrian (2004). The 1/7th Battalion King's Liverpool Regiment and the Great War – the Experience of a Territorial Battalion and its Home Towns (PhD thesis). Coventry University.
- Kuykendall, Ralph S.; Gill, Lorin Tarr (1928). Hawaii in the World War. Honolulu: The Historical Commission.
- Lam, Margaret M. (1932). Six Generations of Race Mixture in Hawaii. Honolulu: University of Hawaii, Sociology MA Thesis. OCLC 16325277.
- McKinzie, Edith Kawelohea (1983). Stagner, Ishmael W. (ed.). Hawaiian Genealogies: Extracted from Hawaiian Language Newspapers. Vol. 1. Honolulu: University of Hawaii Press. ISBN 0-939154-28-5. OCLC 12555087.
- Montano, Mary Jane Kekulani (1931). "The Favorite Sons of Hawaii (Na Kamalei o Hawaii): A Chant Dedicated to George Hea-lii Kahea Beckley, and the Men of Hawaii in the World War". Paradise of the Pacific. Vol. 44. Press Publishing Company – via Google Books.
- Snape, Michael (2019). "Anglo-American Army Chaplaincy in World War I: A Centenary Perspective". In Mallard, Timothy S.; White, Nathan H. (eds.). A Persistent Fire: The Strategic Ethical Impact of World War I on the Global Profession of Arms (PDF). Washington, D.C.: National Defense University Press. pp. 201–230. ISBN 978-0-16-095201-2.
- Stirling, John (1922). The Territorial Divisions, 1914–1918. London: J. M. Dent & Sons.

=== Newspapers and online sources ===
- "Boy Gamblers Warned". The Hawaiian Star. Honolulu, Hawaii. September 27, 1901. p. 1.
- "High Chiefess Laid to Rest". The Pacific Commercial Advertiser. Honolulu. July 13, 1909. p. 8.
- "Hawaiian Lads Are Fighting Bulgars On Balkan Front". Honolulu Star-Advertiser. Honolulu. February 6, 1917. p. 6 – via Newspapers.com.
- "Halawai Ia Mau Hawaii Ma Rumania". Ka Nupepa Kuokoa (in Hawaiian). Honolulu. February 9, 1917.
- "One Hundred Volunteer Britons Respond To Call". Honolulu Star-Advertiser. Honolulu. August 28, 1917. p. 4 – via Newspapers.com.
- "Hawaiians Fighting Under British Flag". Honolulu Star-Advertiser. Honolulu. August 17, 1918. p. 4 – via Newspapers.com.
- "Military Medal". The London Gazette. No. 30940. October 7, 1918. p. 11825.
- "Military Medal". The Edinburgh Gazette. October 9, 1918. p. 3723.
- "Weekly Casualty List, November 12th, 1918" (PDF). War Office. November 12, 1918 – via National Library of Scotland.
- "Have Never Heard From Two Who Joined British". Honolulu Star-Bulletin. Honolulu. December 17, 1918. p. 4 – via Newspapers.com.
- "Two Hawaiian Boys With British Army Are Believed Dead". Honolulu Star-Advertiser. Honolulu. December 17, 1918. p. 7 – via Newspapers.com.
- "Book Only Message Friends Receive". Honolulu Star-Advertiser. Honolulu. January 1, 1919. p. 4 – via Newspapers.com.
- Montano, Mary Jane Kulani (January 3, 1919). "Na Kamalei o Hawaii". Ka Nupepa Kuokoa (in Hawaiian). Honolulu. p. 8.
- "Young Beckley Has Four Wounds". Honolulu Star-Advertiser. Honolulu. January 31, 1919. p. 6 – via Newspapers.com.
- "Loaa Na Medala Hoohanohano". Ke Aloha Aina (in Hawaiian). Vol. XXXIV, no. 5. February 8, 1919. p. 2 – via Nupepa.
- Montano, Mary Jane Kekulani (April 6, 1919). "Bits From Island History". Honolulu Star-Advertiser. Honolulu. p. 7 – via Newspapers.com.
- "King Decorates Son of Hawaii". Honolulu Star-Advertiser. Honolulu. April 16, 1919. p. 4 – via Newspapers.com.
- "George Beckley Still Serving In British Army". Honolulu Star-Bulletin. Honolulu. November 4, 1919. p. 4 – via Newspapers.com.
- "Wounded Veteran of Five Battles Returns to Home". Hilo Daily Tribune. Hilo, Hawaii. December 30, 1919. p. 1.; "Wounded Veteran Home (Continued from Page One)". Hilo Daily Tribune. Hilo, Hawaii. December 30, 1919. p. 6.
- "Veteran of Four Years of Strife Under Two Flags Returns to City". Honolulu Star-Advertiser. Honolulu. December 31, 1919. p. 7 – via Newspapers.com.; "Veteran of Four Years of Strife Returns To City". Honolulu Star-Advertiser. Honolulu. December 31, 1919. p. 10 – via Newspapers.com.
- "Huli Hoi Mai Nei O George H. K. Beckley". Ka Nupepa Kuokoa (in Hawaiian). Vol. LVIII, no. 1. January 2, 1920 – via Papakilo Database.
- "Hawaii Extends Warm Welcome To Prince On Brief Visit To Islands". Honolulu Star-Advertiser. Honolulu. April 14, 1920. p. 13 – via Newspapers.com.
- "Hawaiian Boy Electrocuted At His Work". The Honolulu Advertiser. Honolulu. April 16, 1921. p. 1.; "Hawaiian War Hero Electrocuted; Girl Finds Body At Post (Concluded from Page 1)". The Honolulu Advertiser. Honolulu. April 16, 1921. p. 2.
- "George Beckley Killed By Shock". Hilo Daily Tribune. Hilo, Hawaii. April 16, 1921. p. 1.
- "Military Funeral For G. K. Beckley Killed By Electric Wire". Hawaii Tribune-Herald. Hilo, Hawaii. April 16, 1921. p. 6.
- "Honor Escort Of Troops Ordered For Geo. Beckley". Honolulu Star-Bulletin. Honolulu. April 16, 1921. p. 1.
- "Solons Pay Tribute To Beckley's Memory". Honolulu Star-Bulletin. Honolulu. April 16, 1921. p. 1.
- "Beckley Will Be Given Military Interment Today". The Honolulu Advertiser. Honolulu. April 17, 1921. p. 1.; "Beckley Will Be Given Military Interment (Concluded from Page 1)". The Honolulu Advertiser. Honolulu. April 17, 1921. p. 4.
- "Beckley To Be Buried With Military". Hilo Daily Tribune. Hilo, Hawaii. April 17, 1921. p. 7.
- Bixby, Arthur E. (April 18, 1921). "Veterans Pay Final Tribute To Beckley". Honolulu Star-Bulletin. Honolulu. p. 7.
- "George Beckley Is Buried With Military Honors". The Honolulu Advertiser. Honolulu. April 18, 1921. p. 7.
- "DIED – BECKLEY". Honolulu Star-Bulletin. Honolulu. April 19, 1921. p. 7.
- "War Hero Electrocuted". The Maui News. Wailuku, Hawaii. April 22, 1921. p. 7.
- "Former Caretaker of Royal Mausoleum Dies on Birthday". The Honolulu Advertiser. Honolulu. October 28, 1921. p. 12. Archived from the original on February 1, 2020.
- Montano, Mary Jane Fayerweather (December 10, 1923). "Personal Reminiscences Of Old-Time Hawaii And Noted Actors In Stirring Drama". The Honolulu Advertiser. Honolulu. p. 9 – via Nupepa.
- Montano, Mary Jane Fayerweather (December 25, 1923). "Quaint Recollections Of Hawaiian Royalty In Picturesque Year". The Honolulu Advertiser. Honolulu. p. 12 – via Newspapers.com.
- "Returns After Twenty Years". Hawaii Tribune-Herald. Hilo, Hawaii. March 19, 1933. p. 5.
- Taylor, Clarice B. (July 18, 1960). "Tales About Hawaii: Hoʻopololei: Beckleys". Honolulu Star-Bulletin. Honolulu. p. 26 – via Nupepa.
- Knitting&Death (November 18, 2021). "Who Was the First Soldier from Hawaii to Die in Combat in the Great War?". Medium.
- Meharg, Daniel (April 12, 2024). "How a native Hawaiian found a purpose in life in Siberia Russia: Part One". LinkedIn.
