= Beckley (surname) =

Beckley is a surname. Notable people with the surname include:

- Alfred Beckley (1802–1888), American politician and Confederate militia general
- Art Beckley (1901–1965), American football player
- Beatrice Beckley (1885–?), English-born actress
- Bill Beckley (1946–2024), American artist
- Charlie Beckley (1885–1964), Australian rules footballer
- Elizabeth Beckley (c. 1846 – 1927), British astronomical photographer
- George Charles Beckley (1787–1826), English sailor, trader and military adviser
- George Charles Moʻoheau Beckley (1849–1910), Hawaiian seafarer, grandson of George Charles Beckley and director of the Wilder Steamship Company
- Gerry Beckley (born 1952), American musician
- Jake Beckley (1867–1918), American baseball player
- John J. Beckley (1757–1807), American political campaign manager and Librarian of Congress
- Michael Beckley (born 1963), Australian actor
- Michelle Beckley, American politician
- Paul Beckley (1910–2008), American film critic
- Philip Beckley (born 1936), British physicist and writer
- Rob Beckley (born 1975), American musician
- Tony Beckley (1929–1980), English actor
- William Beckley (disambiguation), multiple people
