= Frederick William Kahapula Beckley =

Frederick William Kahapula Beckley may refer to:

- Frederick William Kahapula Beckley Sr. (1845–1881), Governor of Kauaʻi from 1880 to 1881
- Frederick William Kahapula Beckley Jr. (1874–1943), Hawaiian politician, historian and educator
