= Maria Beckley Kāhea =

Hawaiian chiefess

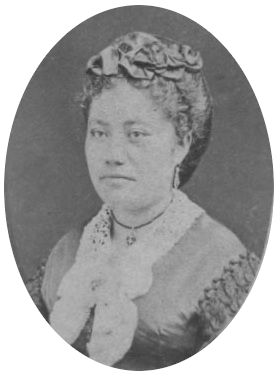

Kahu of the Royal Mausoleum
- In office March 24, 1893 – July 11, 1909
- Preceded by: Poʻomaikelani
- Succeeded by: David Kaipeʻelua Kāhea and Frederick Malulani Beckley Kāhea

Personal details
- Born: Maria Angela Kahaʻawelani Beckley; December 23, 1847 Waimea, Hawaii, Kingdom of Hawaii
- Died: July 11, 1909 (aged 61) Honolulu, Oʻahu, Territory of Hawaii
- Resting place: Oahu Cemetery
- Spouse: David Kaipeʻelua Kahea
- Children: 6 including George Healii Kahea Beckley

Maria Angela Kahaʻawelani Beckley Kāhea (December 23, 1847 – July 11, 1909) was a high chiefess during the Hawaiian Kingdom. She was a granddaughter of Captain George Charles Beckley and High Chiefess Ahia and a descendant of High Chief Hoʻolulu, who helped conceal the bones of Kamehameha I. During her youth, she served as lady-in-waiting in the courts of Queen Emma and Queen Kapiʻolani. She was appointed kahu (keeper or caretaker) of the Royal Mausoleum of Hawaii at Mauna ʻAla in 1893 and served in this position until her death.

== Family ==
Born on December 23, 1847, she was the only daughter and second child of Hawaiian chiefess Kahinu and William Charles Malulani Kaleipaihala Beckley (1814–1871). Her brothers were Frederick William Kahapula Beckley Sr. (1845–1881), who was Governor of Kauaʻi under King Kalākaua, and George Charles Moʻoheau Beckley (1849–1910), a ship captain. Her family was of the aliʻi (nobility) class and traced their descent to King Kahekili II of Maui and King Līloa of Hawaii. Her father was one of the sons of Captain George Charles Beckley, a British sea captain and advisor of King Kamehameha I, who married the High Chiefess Ahia. Her mother Kahinu was the daughter of the High Chief Hoʻolulu who, along with his brother Hoapili, helped conceal the iwi (bones) of King Kamehameha I in a secret hiding place after his death. Her Hawaiian name Kahaʻawelani means "carrying the heavenly one" and honored her grandfather Hoʻolulu who carried the iwi of Kamehameha to his secret burial place.

== Court life and service as kahu ==
During the reign of King Kamehameha V (r. 1863–1872), she served as lady-in-waiting to Queen Dowager Emma, the widow of King Kamehameha IV. After King Kalākaua was elected as monarch in 1874, he sent for Kahea to join his court. On learning of this, Queen Emma asked Kahea to accept the request and to become lady-in-waiting to Kalākaua's wife Queen Kapiʻolani. Kalākaua reigned from 1874 to 1891 and was succeeded by his sister Queen Liliʻuokalani who reigned from 1891 to 1893. Around 1891, Kahea and Hawaiian musician Lizzie Alohikea co-composed the song Ahi Wela which consist of "poetry of passion, telling of sexual combustion that may result from the act of love".

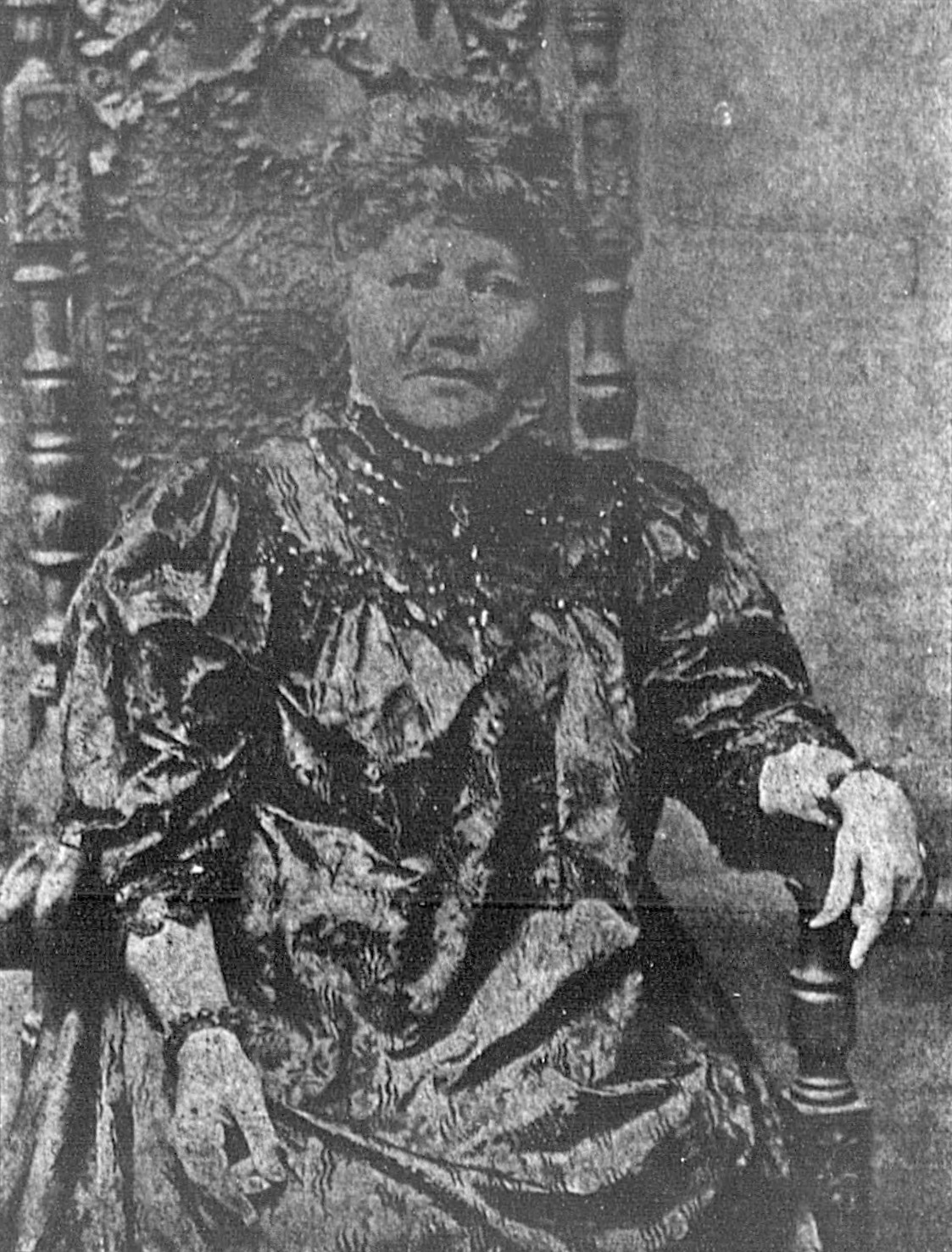
Maria Beckley Kahea, during her later years

On March 24, 1893, two months after the overthrow of the kingdom and the deposition of Queen Liliʻuokalani, Minister of Interior James A. King appointed Kahea and her husband as kahu (caretaker or keeper) of the Royal Mausoleum of Hawaii at Mauna ʻAla. They succeeded Princess Poʻomaikelani, a member of the deposed royal family and the sister of Queen Kapiʻolani in this post. (Note: Later accounts asserted that Queen Liliʻuokalani appointed Kahea as the kahu to the Royal Mausoleum.) On March 25, Liliʻuokalani wrote in her diary:

Wiliokai called to say he was notified by J. C. King of the P. G. that he must leave the mausoleum and to deliver up the keys to Maria Beckley Kahea. Although I was astonished it is better for her to be there then to have another person.

Kahea was the first member of the Hoʻolulu family line to serve as kahu of the Royal Mausoleum. The kuleana (responsibility) of this position has continued in her family and the descendants of her cousin Miriam Auhea Kekāuluohi Crowningburg up to the present-day. On November 30, 1894, the newspaper Hawaii Holomua Progress published a letter Kahea wrote to the editor of the newspaper. In the letter, she explained her connections to the interred monarchs and responded to a November 17 report by the paper that former retainers of King Kalākaua were refused access to the mausoleum on the occasion of the king's birthday on November 16.

In the days of the monarchy the indiscriminate entrance to the Mausoleum of parties not known to be connected by either relationship or by the old acknowledged ties of chiefs and retainers was not permitted. In fact the native people at large always felt outraged when some favorite of the hour, not entitled by birth or marriage, gained access to what is in their eyes a sacred place, the resting place of their beloved and revered chiefs. Supposing any one not entitled as such, had been refused access to the inside of the Mausoleum, where would have been the outrage? No one was refused, but I entrusted with the sacred duty of guarding the resting places of the chiefs to whom I am connected by all requisite ties; would most certainly have refused permission to any indiscriminate unauthorized visit of people. I do not recognise as privilege to do so. I do not understand that it is the intention of the present government to make a public show of the bones of our dead and beloved chiefs and to permit idle visit of uninterested parties just to satisfy a vulgar curiosity. Any offerings of flowers for decoration would have been most gratefully received by the undersigned, and should the bearers have been proper ones to enter, what has always been held by us Hawaiians as tabu precincts, she or he would have most certainly been permitted to place her or his flowers in person by the keeper of the Mausoleum.

— Maria Kahaawelani Kahea

== Death and burial ==
Kahea died at the Sanatorium in Honolulu on the evening of July 11, 1909, from the shock of a surgery for stomach cancer. Her funeral was held in the following afternoon from the Cathedral Basilica of Our Lady of Peace. Her service was attended by relatives, representatives of the old chiefly lines of Hawaii, and members of the Kaʻahumanu Society and the Cathedral was "packed to the very doors" with well-wishers. One of her pallbearers was Edward Kamakau Lilikalani. She was buried at the Oahu Cemetery beside other members of the Beckley family. She was succeeded as kahu by her husband David Kahea.

== Marriage and children ==
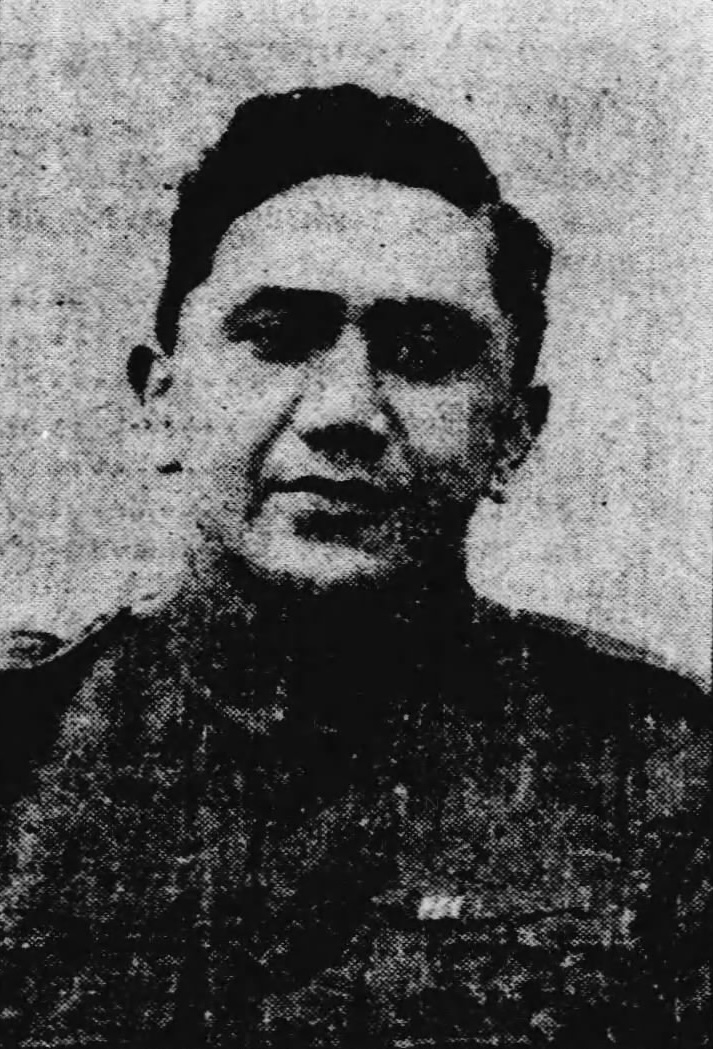
Son George Healii Kahea Beckley, 1919

On October 12, 1885, she married David Kaipeʻelua Kāhea (1846–1921), a native of Maui and graduate of Lahainaluna School.

Maria was the mother of a number of children including Leander Kaonowailani (1875–1938), Violet Kahaleluhi Kinoole (1877–1958), Grace Namahana i Kaleleokalani (1878–1899), Frederick Malulani (1882–1949), George Healii (1886–1921), and Benjamin Pitman Kameʻeiamoku (1892–1954). Frederick Malulani succeeded his parents as kahu of the Royal Mausoleum. George Healii served in the British Army and was a decorated war hero by King George V. Benjamin Kameʻeiamoku fought in the Canadian Army.

Hulihe'e Palace docent Kahea Beckley discovered the marriage certificate proving Maria's first husband was the ship captain Lewis Clark. Maria wrote the popular song Ahi Wela to describe her longing for him as he left her after fathering his first two children. She later married Kāhea. She wanted Clark's name to be erased from history.

== Bibliography ==
- Kuykendall, Ralph Simpson (1965) [1938]. The Hawaiian Kingdom 1778–1854, Foundation and Transformation. Vol. 1. Honolulu: University of Hawaii Press. ISBN 0-87022-431-X. OCLC 47008868.
- Lam, Margaret M. (1932). Six Generations of Race Mixture in Hawaii. Honolulu: University of Hawaii, Sociology MA Thesis. OCLC 16325277.
- McKinzie, Edith Kawelohea (1983). Stagner, Ishmael W. (ed.). Hawaiian Genealogies: Extracted from Hawaiian Language Newspapers. Vol. 1. Honolulu: University of Hawaii Press. ISBN 0-939154-28-5. OCLC 12555087.
- Parker, David "Kawika" (2008). "Crypts of the Ali`i The Last Refuge of the Hawaiian Royalty". Tales of Our Hawaiʻi (PDF). Honolulu: Alu Like, Inc. OCLC 309392477. Archived from the original (PDF) on November 11, 2013.
