= Walter Buckley =

Walter Buckley may refer to:

- Buck Buckley (Walter White Buckley III, born 1960), co-founder of venture capital firm Internet Capital Group
- Walter Buckley (footballer) (1906–1985), English footballer
- Walter F. Buckley (1921–2006), American sociologist

== See also ==
- William Buckley (disambiguation)
