= Frederick William Kahapula Beckley Jr. =

American politician (1874–1943)

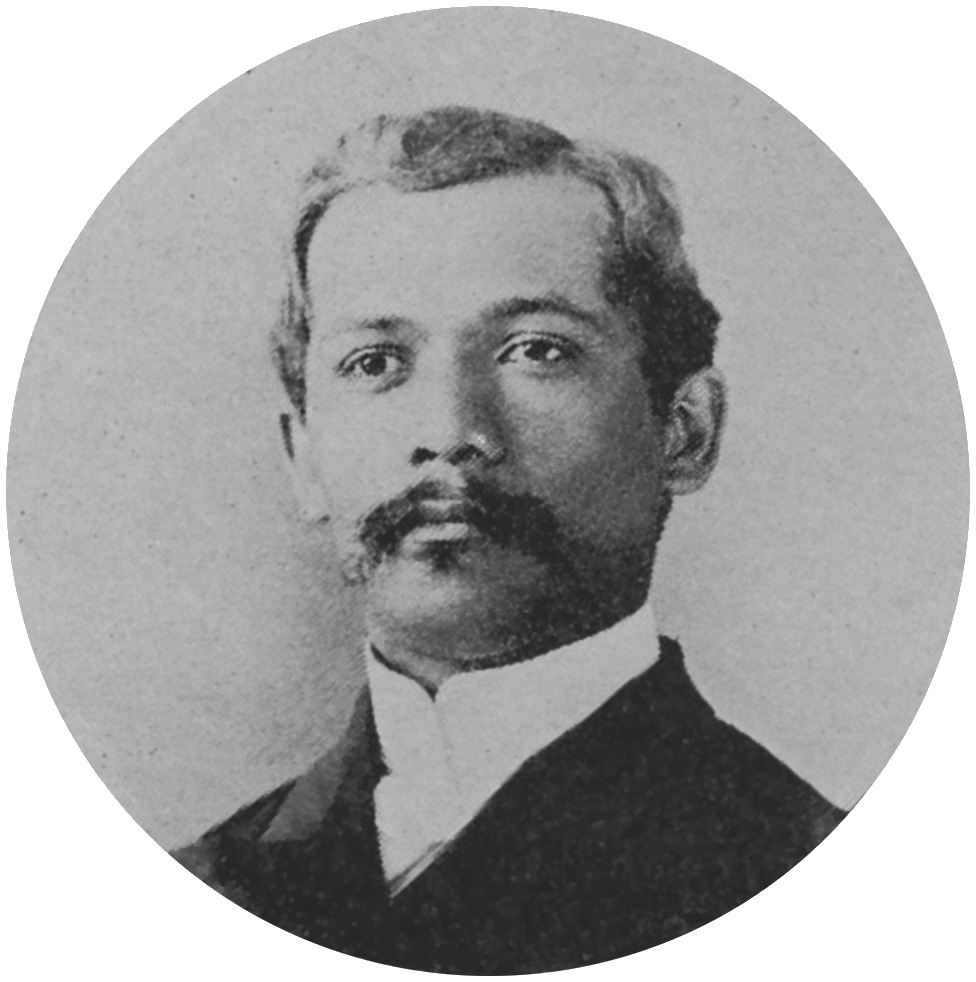
Frederick William Kahapula Beckley

Frederick William Kahapula Beckley Jr. (May 7, 1874 – December 20, 1943) was a Native Hawaiian politician, historian, and educator. He was the last official interpreter of the Hawaii Supreme Court during the Kingdom of Hawaii and was the first professor of Hawaiian language at the University of Hawaii.

== Biography ==
He was born on May 7, 1874, in Honolulu, the son of Frederick William Kahapula Beckley Sr. and Emma Kaili Metcalf. He was descended from chiefly lineages from both his parents, and his ancestors included High Chief Hoʻolulu and Captain George Charles Beckley, both advisors of King Kamehameha I. His father died in 1881 and his mother remarried in 1887 to Moses Kuea Nakuina, who became Beckley's stepfather. At an early age, he became interested in Hawaiian language and history. He was educated at Saint Louis School, Kamehameha Schools, and Oahu College.

Beckley served as the last official interpreter of the Supreme Court prior to the Overthrow of the Kingdom of Hawaii. Afterward, he continued working as a translator and was interpreter for the Territory of Hawaii's First Circuit Court from 1906 to 1914. In 1900, he ran for the Hawaii Territorial House of Representatives representing Maui as a candidate of the Home Rule Party, led by former royalist revolutionary Robert William Wilcox. While in the legislature, he served as Vice-Speaker in 1901 and 1902 was Speaker of the House from 1903 to 1904. He later joined the Hawaii Republican Party.

In later life, he became an educator. He taught Hawaiian history and language at McKinley High School and served as the first professor of Hawaiian language at the University of Hawaii in 1922.

He married Alice L. K. Heanu on October 2, 1902. They had nine children. Beckley died on December 20, 1943.

== Bibliography ==
- Bacchilega, Cristina (2011). Legendary Hawaiʻi and the Politics of Place: Tradition, Translation, and Tourism. Philadelphia: University of Pennsylvania Press. ISBN 978-0-8122-0117-8. OCLC 759158207.
- Hawaii (1918). Lydecker, Robert Colfax (ed.). Roster Legislatures of Hawaii, 1841–1918. Honolulu: Hawaiian Gazette Company. OCLC 60737418.
- Ritter, Charles F. (1989). American Legislative Leaders, 1850–1910. New York: Greenwood Press. ISBN 978-0-313-23943-4. OCLC 18523119.
