= Beckley =

Beckley may refer to:

== Organisations ==
- Beckley Foundation

== Places ==
United Kingdom

- Beckley, East Sussex, England
- Beckley, Hampshire, England
- Beckley, Oxfordshire, England
  - Beckley Park, a stately home

United States

- Beckley, Louisville, Kentucky
- Beckley, West Virginia

== Other uses ==
- Beckley (surname)
- Beckley Foundation, a UK-based thinktank
