= William Beckley =

William Beckley may refer to:

- William Beckley (Carmelite) (died 1438), English Carmelite
- William Beckley (actor) (1930–2015), British American actor

== See also ==
- William Buckley (disambiguation)
