= Frederick William Kahapula Beckley Sr. =

Hawaiian high chief (1845–1881)

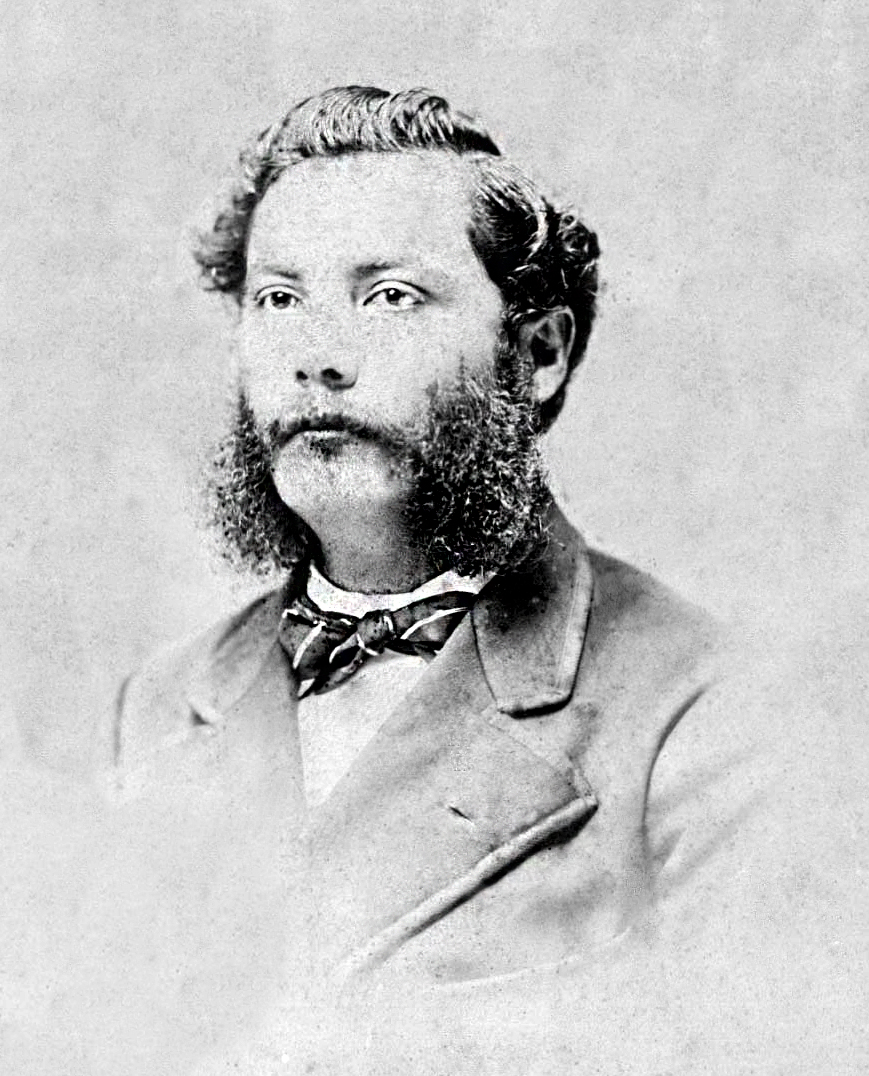

Governor of Kauaʻi
- In office August 16, 1880 – January 7, 1881
- Preceded by: John E. Bush
- Succeeded by: Paul P. Kanoa

Personal details
- Born: November 26, 1845 Waimea, Hawaii, Kingdom of Hawaii
- Died: January 7, 1881 (aged 35) Honolulu, Oʻahu
- Resting place: Oahu Cemetery
- Spouse: Emma Kaili Metcalf
- Children: Frederick William Kahapula Beckley Jr. and others

Frederick William Kahapula Beckley Sr. (November 26, 1845 – January 7, 1881) was a Hawaiian high chief, who served as Governor of Kauaʻi from 1880 to 1881.

== Biography ==
He was born at Waimea, on November 26, 1845, to William Charles Malulani Kaleipaihala Beckley and Kahinu o Kekuaokalani i Lekeleke. His father was one of the sons of Captain George Charles Beckley, a British sea captain and advisor of King Kamehameha I, who married the High Chiefess Ahia. His mother Kahinu was the daughter of the High Chief Hoʻolulu. His siblings were Maria Beckley Kahea and George Moʻoheau Beckley. He received a good education.

On December 3, 1867, Beckley married part-Hawaiian Emma Kaili Metcalf (1847–1929) and had a total of seven children including son Frederick William Kahapula Beckley Jr. (1874–1943) and daughter Sabina Beckley Hutchinson (1868–1935). His wife remarried to Moses Nakuina and was later appointed curator of the Hawaiian National Library and Museum.

He worked as a purser on the steamship Kilauea and was later appointed second clerk in the land office after King Kalākaua's accession in 1874. Upon the death of Edwin Harbottle Boyd in 1875, he was appointed the Royal Chamberlain which he served for a time before resigning to pursue business in the booming sugar business on Molokai. In 1880, he ran successfully as a representative for Molokai and Lanai. After John E. Bush resigned to assume the post of Minister of the Interior, Beckley was appointed to succeed him as the Governor of Kauaʻi by King Kalākaua on August 16, 1880, a position he held until his death.

After a period of illness, Beckley died on January 7, 1881, in Honolulu, from dropsy, at the age of 36. Beckley Street in Kalihi, Honolulu is named after him.

== Bibliography ==
- Bacchilega, Cristina (2011). Legendary Hawaiʻi and the Politics of Place: Tradition, Translation, and Tourism. Philadelphia: University of Pennsylvania Press. ISBN 978-0-8122-0117-8. OCLC 759158207.
- Hawaii (1918). Lydecker, Robert Colfax (ed.). Roster Legislatures of Hawaii, 1841–1918. Honolulu: Hawaiian Gazette Company. OCLC 60737418.
- Hopkins, James Uluwehi (August 2012). Hānau Ma Ka Lolo, For the Benefit of Her Race: a Portrait of Emma Kaʻilikapuolono Metcalf Beckley Nakuina (PDF) (Master of Arts thesis). University of Hawaii at Manoa.
- Peterson, Barbara Bennett (1984). Notable Women of Hawaii. Honolulu: University of Hawaii Press. ISBN 978-0-8248-0820-4. OCLC 11030010.
- Pukui, Mary Kawena; Elbert, Samuel H.; Mookini, Esther T. (1974). Place Names of Hawaii. Honolulu: University of Hawaii Press. ISBN 978-0-8248-0524-1. OCLC 1042464.
