= George Charles Moʻoheau Beckley =

Member of the Hawaiian Kingdom Privy Council

George Charles Mo'oheau Beckley
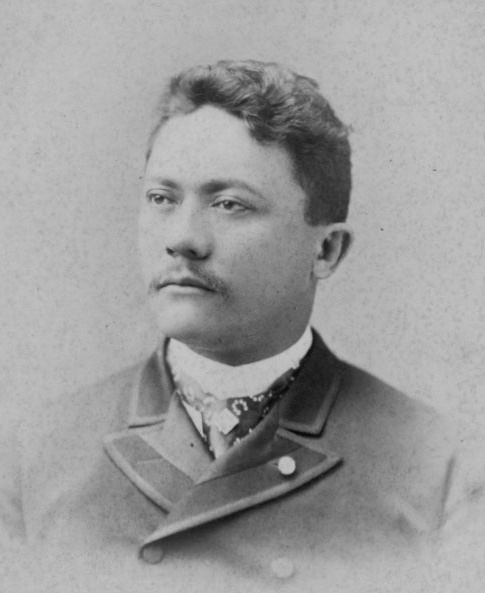
- Born: George Charles Mo'oheau Kauluheimalama Beckley; May 5, 1849; Waimea, Kingdom of Hawaiʻi
- Died: July 4, 1910 (aged 61); Honolulu, Territory of Hawaii, U.S.
- Occupation: Mariner
- Spouse: Mary Camille Risley
- Children: 4

George Charles Mo'oheau Kauluheimalama Beckley (May 5, 1849 – July 4, 1910) was a member of Liliʻuokalani's Privy Council of State from 1891 to 1892, and a director of the Wilder Steamship Company. Born of Hawaiian and British ancestry, his native Hawaiian forebears were reputed to have helped hide the bones of Kamehameha I. Like his British grandfather who was an advisor to Kamehameha I, he chose a life sailing the seas. In his youth, he joined whaling expeditions and survived a hijacking spree by pirates who captured 29 ships. Beckley was one of 50 Hawaiian crew members who were rescued from multiple vessels and sent safely back to Hawaii. He found his life's career with Hawaii's inter-island steamships, where he partnered with Samuel G. Wilder. Beckley was awarded the Royal Order of the Star of Oceania and the Order of the Crown of Hawaii by King Kalākaua.

== Family background ==
Born in Waimea, on the island of Hawaii, George Charles Mo'oheau Kauluheimalama Beckley was the second son and third child of Hawaiian chiefess Kahinu and William Charles Malulani Kaleipaihala Beckley (1814–1871). He was considered a high chief in Hawaiian royalty. His elder siblings were brother Frederick William Kahapula Beckley Sr. (1845–1881), who was Governor of Kauaʻi under King Kalākaua, and sister Maria Beckley Kahea (1847–1909), a lady-in-waiting to Queen Kapiʻolani, and kahu (Note: "Honored attendant, guardian, nurse, keeper of ʻunihipili bones, regent, keeper, administrator, warden, caretaker, master, mistress; pastor, minister, reverend, or preacher of a church") of the Royal Mausoleum of Hawaii.

Both his parents were of aliʻi (royal) descent through the 15th century ruler Līloa of the island of Hawaii. His maternal lineage descended from Kameʻeiamoku (died 1802), one of the royal twins (with Kamanawa) who advised Kamehameha I in his conquest of the Hawaiian Islands. Beckley's mother Kahinu was the daughter of Hoʻolulu who, along with half-brother Hoapili, helped conceal the bones of King Kamehameha I in a secret hiding place after the ruler's death. According to legend, only one individual in each generation of Hoʻolulu‘s family was given knowledge of the location of the royal bones. On his paternal side, his British grandfather George Charles Beckley (1787–1826) was a sea captain who became an adviser to Kamehameha I and married high chiefess Elizabeth Ahia (1797–1854), a distant relation of the reigning House of Kamehameha and descendant of Līloa. Captain Beckley was subsequently made a high chief, and was the first commander of Honolulu Fort.

Beckley married part-Hawaiian Mary Camille Risley (1856–1950) on May 20, 1876. The couple were known for being gracious host and hostess during the years of the monarchy. In 1897, Mary was mentioned in an article by Janet Jennings, of the Chicago Times-Herald, about the important role and status of part-Hawaiian women in the Hawaiian nation, which described her as "one of the most graceful young matrons in Honolulu." They were the parents of Henry Hoʻolulu Pitman Beckley (1876–1955), Juanita Kamakahukilani Beckley (1885–1932) and George Charles Moʻoheau Beckley, Jr. (1887–1932). William Kauluheimalama, also named William Ahuena Beckley (1873–1947) was the son of Beckley and Mary Kameʻeleihiwa Miner Brown (who later married Menzies Dickson and Cecil Brown). Like his father, William chose a career as a steamship purser in Hawaii.

== Career ==
The last eight years of his life, he was referred to in the news media as "Admiral Beckley", but the title was honorary, not an official career rank. Beckley had never served in any government navy, nor was he in command of any fleet. On January 18, 1902, the Masters and Pilots Association labor union of Honolulu had an "admiral's flag" designed as a gift in recognition of his lifetime working on the seas. In reality, he was a purser at that time, but the news media adopted the sobriquet, and referred to him as an admiral for the remainder of his life.

Beckley set his sights on a career at sea at an early age, and hired on as a cabin boy aboard the whaling bark Catherine. Sources vary as to what age he was when he left home, anywhere from age 8 to 14–15. He was on the Catherine when the bark became one of 29 vessels captured and destroyed by the pirate ship Shenandoah on June 26, 1865. Among the rescued crews from all captured ships were 50 Hawaiians, including Beckley, all of whom were sent back to Honolulu. He later made a number of whaling voyages as a crew member on the barks Monticello and Eagle. Beckley himself at times had selective memory about his accomplishments, once claiming to have discovered the North Pole and also to have struck gold in Nome, Alaska, both in 1863 during voyages with Captain Alfred N. Tripp. When Tripp read of the claims, he refuted both the date claimed and any contact with either the North Pole or Nome. Beckely was, in fact, a boat steerer for Tripp 1868–1872 on the bark Arctic and the brig Kolaha, but they were never far enough north to reach either Nome or the North Pole.

It was in Hawaiian waters where Beckley spent most of his career. In September 1865, he signed on as a second steward with the inter-island steamship Kilauea. Ownership of the vessel changed hands several times over the years, and was at some point drydocked. The Hawaiian government became the sole owner of the Kilauea in 1870, and Beckley signed on as a deckhand in 1871, at that time under the management of Samuel G. Wilder. Because of Beckley's familial ties to the monarchy, he was given his own cabin. He was promoted to first officer in 1873. The steamer played a part in the 1874 election between Queen Emma and Kalākaua, when Wilder utilized the vessel for an island-to-island campaign on behalf of his friend Kalākaua. Beckley bought shares in the Wilder Steamship Company, and became one of the directors.

Beckley was appointed freight clerk to the steamer Likelike in 1877, and soon was elevated to purser. In 1879, he traveled from San Francisco to Honolulu as the captain on the maiden voyage of the Wilder steamer Lehua. At journey's end for the Lehua, he went back to the Likelike as first mate. During the period 1882–1897, Beckley was a purser on the steamship Kinau, as well as being a purser on the Mauna Kea during unspecified dates. He was listed as the commodore for the Wilder Steamship Company Helene on her 1897 maiden voyage from San Francisco to Honolulu. Beckley earned a license in 1901 to navigate as a master and pilot in Hawaiian waters.

== Queen Victoria's Golden Jubilee ==
Queen Kapiolani and then-Princess Liliʻuokalani began their journey to the Golden Jubilee of Queen Victoria on April 12, 1887, aboard the steamship Australia. George and Mary Beckley were among the 150 dignitaries and family members accompanying the royal party on their journey. Along the way, they all attended an opera in San Francisco. During a stop-over at the Grand Pacific Hotel in Chicago, Beckley regaled a reporter with an account of having once beaten King Kalākaua in a game of poker; in lieu of a cash settlement, Beckley claimed to have negotiated for a like amount to be deducted from his taxes. The Beckleys went as far as Boston and New York before the royal party sailed for Liverpool.

== Political activities ==
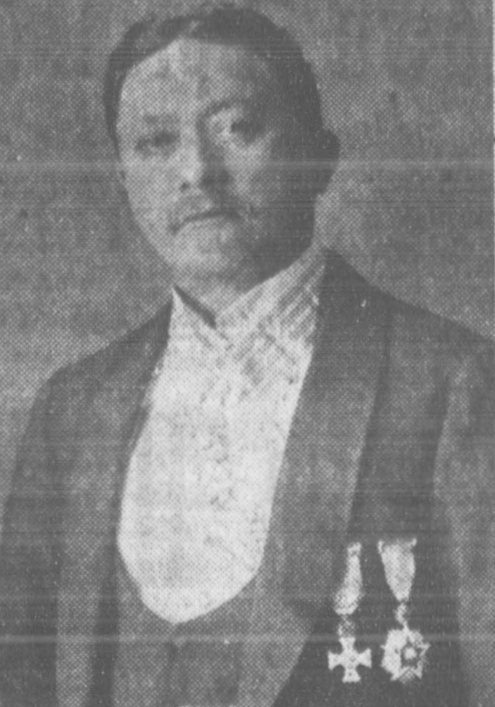
Beckley wearing the Order of the Crown of Hawaii and the Royal Order of the Star of Oceania

Beckley was a seafarer, not known for political involvement, but his ties to the monarchy, and his loyalty to the native Hawaiian population, impelled him to run for office. On June 30, 1887, King Kalākaua was forced to sign the Bayonet Constitution under duress by the Hawaiian League, a group of foreign businessman and Hawaiian subjects of American missionary descent. (Note: Lorrin A. Thurston was one of the founders of the Hawaiian League. The original members also included Joseph B. Atherton, William R. Castle, Sanford B. Dole, William W. Hall, James A. Hopper, Peter C. Jones, Henry W. Mist, John H. Paty and William O. Smith.) This constitution limited the absolute power of the monarch and strengthened the power of the executive cabinet. It also raised property requirements for suffrage, disenfranchised many impoverished native Hawaiians and naturalized Asian citizens, and gave the vote to unnaturalized foreign residents of European or American descent. Instigators of this coup d'état formed the Reform Party, drawing its membership from Hawaiian conservatives and citizens of foreign descent. The new constitution also called for an election to be held ninety days after its enactment on September 12, 1887.

Beckley became an independent against the newly empowered Reform Party. In the special election of 1887, he and his fellow native Hawaiian Joseph Nāwahī ran under the opposition ticket against Reform Party members Henry Deacon and D. Kamai but lost due to the disenfranchisement of much of the native constituencies. Deacon and Kamai would represent Hilo in the special legislative session of 1887 and the regular session of 1888. (Note: There was no election in 1888; sitting representatives continued to hold their seats during the 1888 session.)

Kalākaua awarded Beckley the Royal Order of the Star of Oceania and the Order of the Crown of Hawaii. He was appointed to the Privy Council of State of Queen Liliʻuokalani on August 31, 1891, and sworn in by Chief Justice Albert Francis Judd on July 8, 1892. The minutes of the Privy Council only record his attendance to one meeting, the one in which he was sworn into the body. The century-old archived government records are often spotty, and are not necessarily a complete record of any councillor's contributions. The Privy Council was abolished after the overthrow of the Hawaiian Kingdom in 1893.

== Death ==
Daisies and maile pinned to white tarleton were used to cover the sides and bottom of the grave, so that not a particle of earth was to be seen, and when the casket was lowered and covered with more flowers and turf, the beautiful flora offerings and magnificent set pieces were strewn over the plot until it was a carpet of fragrant blossoms.

— The Hawaiian Gazette

Beckley died on July 4, 1910, in San Francisco, California, after a lengthy battle with stomach cancer. His sister Maria had died of the same disease on July 12, 1909. Wife Mary Beckley and daughter Juanita accompanied his body back to Hawaii on the Matson Navigation liner SS Wilhelmina.

He was a 32nd degree Mason, and when the SS Wilhelmina arrived in Honolulu, six members of masonry lodges in Hawaii escorted his body to the Beckley home, where friends and family paid their respects. Queen Liliʻuokalani and Princess Abigail Campbell Kawānanakoa were among the visitors. The Kawaihau Club, founded in 1876 by Leleiohoku II as the Hui Kawaihau, serenaded with songs written by Beckley's widow. Following a private service for the family and visitors, the body was taken to a masonic temple for a public funeral. Pall bearers who escorted the casket to burial at Nuuanu cemetery were representative of Beckley's diverse civic involvements:

Colonel John Harris Soper, Robert Hare – Masons
Rev. Stephen L. Desha of Haili Church, Carlos Long – Kamehamaha Lodge
Capt. T. K Clark, Captain John R. Macaulay – Masters and Pilots Association
Territorial senator Cecil Brown and Liliʻuokalani's former privy councillor Mark P. Robinson.

The estate of George C. Beckley was valued at $150,000, with his widow Mary as the sole beneficiary. Upon her death, the estate was equally divided among her three children George, Henry and Juanita. Beckley's son William did not inherit.

== Bibliography ==
- Dole, Charles S. (1929). "The Hui Kawaihau". Papers of the Hawaiian Historical Society. 16. hdl:10524/978.
- Kemble, John Haskell (1946). "Pioneer Hawaiian Steamers, 1852–1877". Annual Report. Hawaiian Historical Society. hdl:10524/78.
- Kuykendall, Ralph Simpson (1965) [1938]. The Hawaiian Kingdom 1778–1854, Foundation and Transformation. Vol. 1. Honolulu: University of Hawaii Press. ISBN 0-87022-431-X. OCLC 47008868.
- Kuykendall, Ralph Simpson (1967). The Hawaiian Kingdom 1874–1893, The Kalakaua Dynasty. Vol. 3. Honolulu: University of Hawaii Press. ISBN 978-0-87022-433-1. OCLC 500374815.
- Lam, Margaret M. (1932). Six Generations of Race Mixture in Hawaii. Honolulu: University of Hawaii, Sociology MA Thesis. OCLC 16325277.
- Lydecker, Robert Colfax, ed. (1918). Roster Legislatures of Hawaii, 1841–1918. Honolulu: Hawaiian Gazette Company. OCLC 60737418.
- McKinzie, Edith Kawelohea (1983). Stagner, Ishmael W. (ed.). Hawaiian Genealogies: Extracted from Hawaiian Language Newspapers. Vol. 1. Honolulu: University of Hawaii Press. ISBN 0-939154-28-5. OCLC 12555087.
- Osorio, Jon Kamakawiwoʻole (2002). Dismembering Lāhui: A History of the Hawaiian Nation to 1887. Honolulu: University of Hawaii Press. ISBN 0-8248-2549-7. OCLC 48579247.
- Peterson, Barbara Bennett, ed. (1984). Notable Women of Hawaii. Honolulu: University of Hawaii Press. ISBN 978-0-8248-0820-4. OCLC 11030010.
