= William Buckley =

William, Will or Bill Buckley may refer to:

- William Buckley (convict) (1780–1856), English convict
- William Edward Buckley (1817–1892), Rawlinsonian Professor of Anglo-Saxon at the University of Oxford
- William F. Buckley Sr. (1881–1958), lawyer in Tampico, Mexico (father of William F. Buckley Jr.)
- Bill Buckley (Australian rules footballer) (1896–1946), Australian footballer
- Bill Buckley (rugby league) (1906–1973), Australian rugby league footballer and administrator
- William F. Buckley Jr. (1925–2008), American author and conservative commentator
- William Francis Buckley (1928–1985), U.S. Army officer and intelligence agency operative
- William Buckley (hurler), Irish hurler
- Bill Buckley (radio presenter) (born 1959), radio, television presenter and actor
- Will Buckley (footballer) (born 1989), English former professional footballer
- Will Buckley (journalist), journalist and author

== See also ==
- Cecil William Buckley (1830–1872), recipient of the Victoria Cross
- William Beckley (disambiguation)
