= Paul Beckley =

American film critic

Paul V. Beckley (February 17, 1910 in Tulsa - November 29, 2008) was an American film critic, best known for his work with the New York Herald Tribune from 1941 to 1965. Before joining the Tribune in New York City he worked as a reporter for the Kansas City Journal. In 1965 it was reported that he had joined the Radio-Television Daily, and he became a senior writer for the 6 o'clock CBS news. He is buried at Pinelawn Memorial Park.
