= William Beckley (Carmelite) =

English Carmelite

William Beckley O.Carm
- Died: 1438

William Beckley (died 1438) was an English Carmelite.

== Life ==
Beckley was born in Kent, probably in the neighbourhood of Sandwich, where he appears to have entered the order of the Carmelites in early life.

While still young he proceeded to Cambridge, where the Carmelites had had a house since the year 1291. Here he seems to have taken his doctor's degree in divinity, and to have established a considerable reputation as a theologian. Bale praises his modesty of speech, and his firm proceedings against evildoers in all the assemblies ("conventibus") over which he presided. This incidental remark would alone prove him to have been a man of mark among the English Carmelites, even without the next sentence, in which we are told that while Beckley was engaged in the king's business Thomas Walden used to protect his interests at Cambridge against the complaints of his fellow-doctors there. Tanner makes mention of a letter from the chancellor and University of Cambridge to the provincial chapter of the Carmelites at Northampton, referring to a charge that had been brought against Beckley for his absence from the university anno primo regentiæ for which offence he had been suspended. He also notices Walden's reply to this letter.

In his old age, after having spent many years at Cambridge, Beckley seems to have withdrawn to his native place, Sandwich, where, according to Bale, he became head of the Carmelite friary, and devoted the remainder of his life to study.

On his death, which occurred in 1438, he was buried in Sandwich, and the Latin verses inscribed upon his tomb, and probably written by himself, are preserved in Weever's Funeral Monuments.

Dempster has claimed Beckley as a Scottish monk, and gives several details of his life, how he was exiled from Scotland and took up his abode in France, whence he was recalled by James III, but apparently preferred to remain in England when once he set foot in that country on his return journey. But the authorities to whom Dempster appeals, Gilbert Brown (died 1612), and P. M. Thomas Sarracenus, an ex-professor of Bologna, can hardly be accepted as sufficient testimony for these statements in the face of so much contrary evidence. The tradition of a residence in France may, contain some degree of truth when we consider Bale's plain statement as to Beckley's being employed in royal business, and his subsequent statement that Beckley delivered declamations to the nobility and chief officers in many parts of England, and in Calais also.

The chief works assigned to him are similar in their titles to those of most mediaeval theologians, and consist of "Quodlibeta", "Quæstiones Ordinariæ", "Conciones Variæ", and one which, had it been preserved, might perhaps have been of some interest, entitled De Fraterculorum Decimis. (Note: Leland. 437) (Note: Bale, 579) (Note: Pits, 627) (Note: Tanner's Bibl. British 84) (Note: Bale's Heliades. Harley manuscripts 3838, ii. 85) (Note: Lambard's Perambumlation of Kent, 106) (Note: St. Etienne's Bibliotheca Carmelitana, i. 590) (Note: Weever's Funeral Monuments, 264.)
