= Ka Nupepa Kuokoa =

Hawaiian-language newspaper (1861–1927)

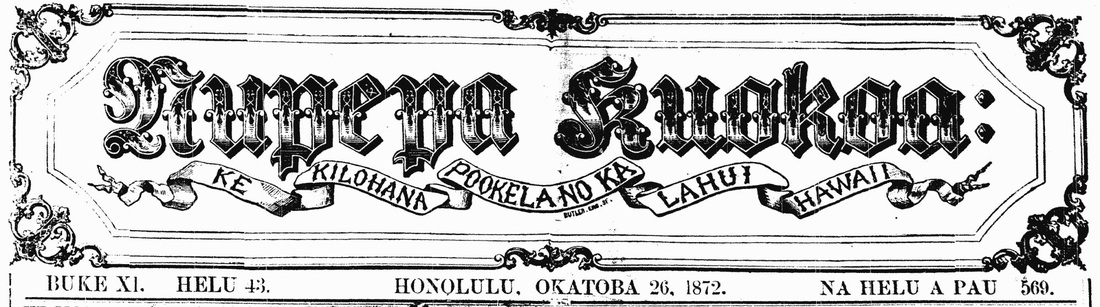
- Masthead from 1872 of Ka Nupepa Kuokoa
- Founder: Henry Martyn Whitney
- Founded: 1861
- Ceased publication: 1927
- Language: Hawaiian
- OCLC number: 8820867

Ka Nupepa Kuokoa (The Independent Newspaper) was a Hawaiian language newspaper which ran in circulation for 66 years (1861–1927) as the most popular Hawaiian national journal. In the Hawaiian Language kuokoa means "independent". The paper was begun in 1861, shortly after David Kalākaua began the first Hawaiian language, national paper entitled; Ka Hoku o Ka Pakipika (Star of the Pacific) edited by Hawaiians for Hawaiian interests. Henry Martyn Whitney, the son of missionaries began Kuokoa to run alongside his other publication, the Pacific Commercial Advertiser soon afterwards.

Whitney's two papers followed a similar political ideology from the missionary establishment of the time, however it was popular among the Hawaiian people due to the rich history, genealogies and mele (Hawaiian song) it printed regularly. Whitney himself was heavily influenced by American values, supported annexation, and held the Hawaiian people with little regard.

== Background ==
Prior to 1820, kānaka ʻōiwi or Native Hawaiians (also called kānaka maoli) had been communicating orally with a memory based history passed down through oral genealogy chants. Missionaries began developing a written Hawaiian language. By 1836 there were two Hawaiian Language newspapers, Lorrin Andrews' seminary publication; Ka Lama Hawaii, and a newspaper called Ke Kumu Hawaii. From 1836 to 1861, newspapers were printed by either Protestant or Catholic publishers or by the Kingdom government. Beginning in 1861, Hawaiian national newspapers would begin to be printed in the Hawaiian language by Native Hawaiians for indigenous Hawaiian interests. Kamehameha III had resisted the Calvinist Church for decades but in later years the missionaries went almost uncontested after the Mahele was forced into place. Kamehameha IV and his brother Lot, Kamehameha V resisted much of the church's politics and felt that church's ideals alone should not rule Hawaii.

Kānaka ʻōiwi by this time had begun to feel alienated from the westernization of the kingdom sought by the aliʻi (Nobles of Hawaii) of the time, heavily influenced by political processes such as the Great Mahele and western style, constitutional government. The rise of colonial capitalism and the Calvinist Church was opposed, yet still facilitated by the ruling class. Foreign influence began as advisors and over time became foreign judges, passing judgments on Hawaiians. Schools began to be separated for commoners, teaching in only Hawaiian and preparing students for life as little more than laborers. Class separation became racial separation with foreign land and plantation owners taking much of the land and native kānaka ʻōiwi and the Asian immigrants in the fields.

=== Independent newspapers ===
Henry Martyn Whitney, the son of missionaries, had begun the first independent newspaper in Hawaii called, Pacific Commercial Advertiser in Honolulu on July 2, 1856. The paper had a regular section devoted to content in Native Hawaiian called Ka Hoku Loa O Hawaii (The Morning Star). The section was added to the paper in 1856 as a single page added to the four page Advertiser. The subscription price was six dollars a year and complaints of only having three-fourths of the paper available in English eventually led to the section being removed after the Pacific Commercial Advertiser stopped publishing for a short period. When the paper resumed publication, the Hawaiian section had been removed.

In 1859 Henry Parker began a missionary paper called Ka Huko Loa (The Distant Star). Native Hawaiian newspapermen and readers petitioned Parker to publish the paper in Hawaiian but Parker left the Island before anything was accomplished. Both the Ka Hoku Loa and the government paper encouraged colonial support and condemning native culture and practices.

On September 26, 1861, Ka Hoku o Ka Pakipika began printing as the first real resistance to the foreign missionary establishment. The paper was started by David Kalakaua, before he ruled. Kalakau would produce several periodicals throughout his life earning him the nickname of the "Editor King". Immediately the paper was criticized by the missionary establishment, and it was a struggle to survive, even with support. Today these papers have rare content found only in non-English sources. With the resurgence of the Hawaiian renaissance, these sources are in high demand.

== Publishing start up ==
Ka Nupepa Kuokoa was established by Henry Whitney in order to instruct Kanaka's on how to be more colonialized like the foreign missionaries in a slightly different manner than the Ka Hoku Loa but in direct odds with the aims of Ka Hoku o Ka Pakipika, the independent national paper from Kalakaua. It published Hawaiian moʻolelo (legends, tales and myth) beginning with Hawaiian language versions of European fairytales from The Brothers Grimm and eventually printing the story of Umi-a-Liloa. It also reported that the old Hawaiian religion was still being practiced in a critical write-up. Regardless of the political ideology of the paper, eventually these moʻolelo would demonstrate how these papers were used by the indigenous population to speak of and to their own people, as distinct and of the land, as well as rights and justice.
