= Charlie Beckley =

Australian rules footballer

Personal information
- Full name: John Charles Beckley
- Born: 26 February 1885; North Melbourne, Victoria
- Died: 27 November 1964 (aged 79); Parkville, Victoria
- Original team: South Yarra

Playing career^{1}
Years	Club	Games (Goals)
1909–10	Essendon	13 (9)
- ^{1} Playing statistics correct to the end of 1910.

John Charles Beckley (26 February 1885 – 27 November 1964) was an Australian rules footballer who played with Essendon in the Victorian Football League (VFL).
