= George Charles Beckley =

English merchant and military advisor

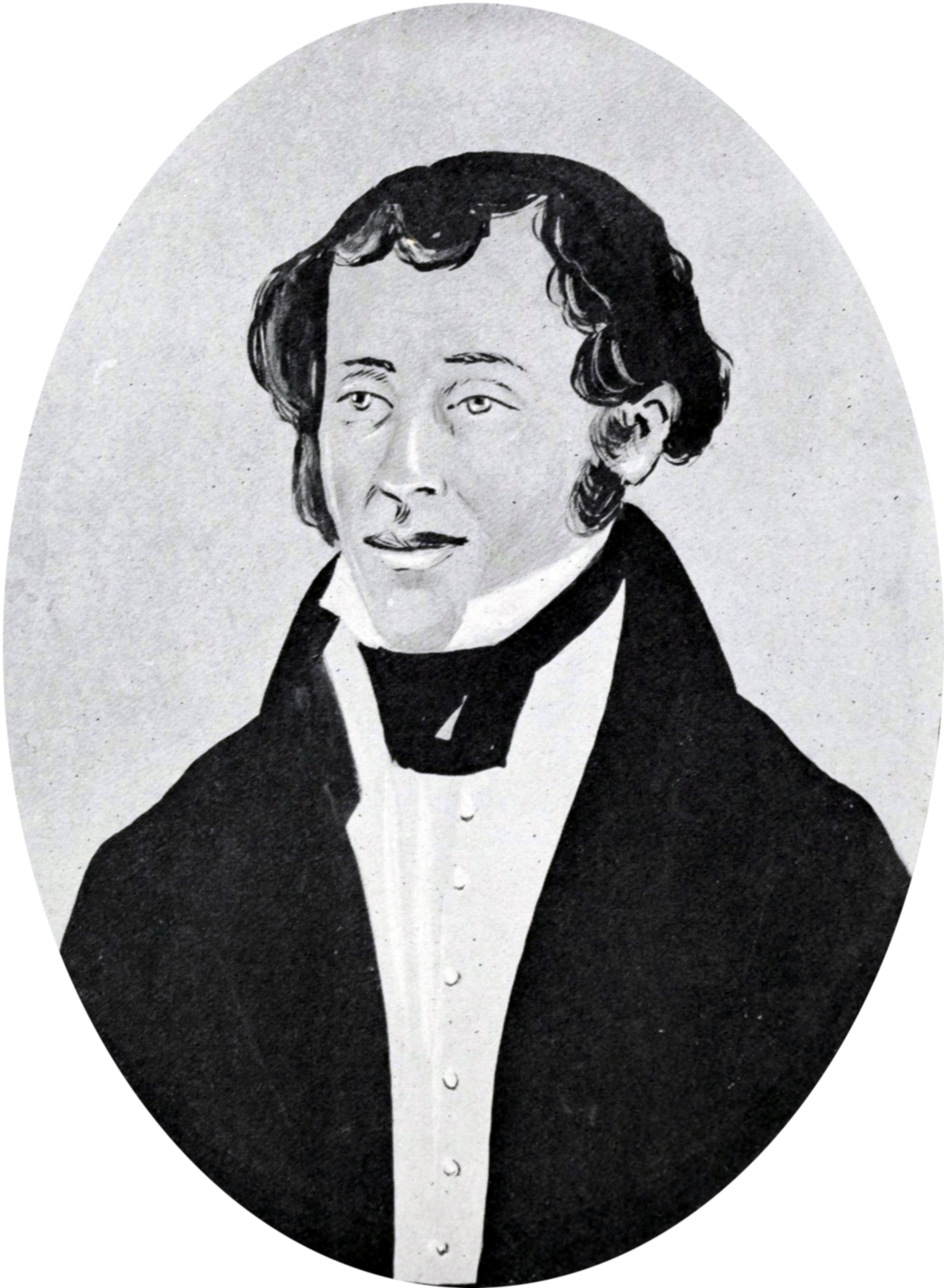
- George Charles Beckley
- Born: March 5, 1787; England
- Died: April 16, 1826 (aged 39); Honolulu, Oahu, Hawaii
- Burial place: Oahu Cemetery
- Occupations: Sailor, military advisor
- Known for: Designing the Flag of Hawaii
- Spouse: Elizabeth Ahia

George Charles Beckley (March 5, 1787 – April 16, 1826) was an English captain, trader, and military adviser. He was one of the earliest foreigners to have a major impact in the Kingdom of Hawaii, where he eventually became a noble, and was one of the disputed creators of the Flag of Hawaii.

== Life ==
Beckley was born in England, possibly on March 5, 1787. He moved to Veracruz when his father was granted a privateering licence by the Mexican government.

In 1801, Beckley arrived in Honolulu, in what was then known to him as the Sandwich Islands. He sold his ship to local chiefs and took up residence in the kingdom. During his early years in the islands, Beckley acted as a privateer; he waylaid ships on the high seas and sold many of them to King Kamehameha I, who was attempting to consolidate his control over the kingdom. The Englishman eventually rose to some prominence in the court of Kamehameha, and Beckley became one of the king’s foreign advisors. On the occasion of the birth of the Princess Nāhiʻenaʻena at Keauhou, Kona, Hawaii, in 1815, Beckley was made a high chief by Kamehameha I so that he might, with "impunity enter the sacred precincts of the grass house". Beckley "present[ed] the royal infant with a roll of China silk, after which he went outside and fired a salute of thirteen guns in her honor.".

American missionary Hiram Bingham I mentioned in his diary that an "Englishman Beckley" occupied a position of some importance on the islands. Russian explorer Otto von Kotzebue recorded his meeting with Beckley on the island of Oahu in his journal. Beckley continued to go to sea often, and was a major participator in the Sino-Hawaiian sandalwood trade. He organized trips to Fanning Island to hunt the valuable Hawaiian monk seal, and on occasion returned to privateering.

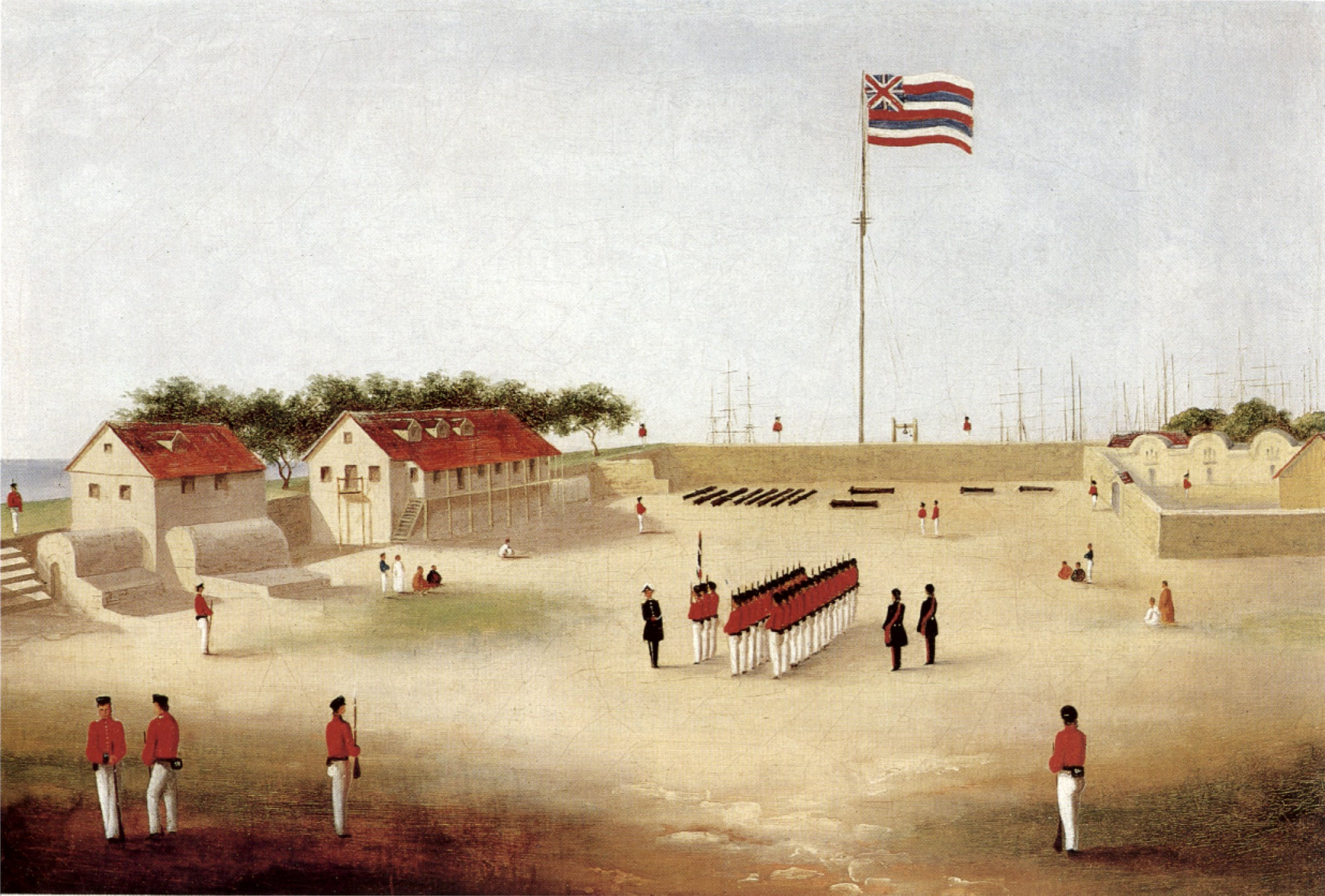
Interior of the Honolulu Fort in 1853, by Paul Emmert.

In 1816, Beckley became the first commander of Honolulu Fort, a military garrison erected on the waterfront of Honolulu by King Kamehameha I and Prime Minister Kalanimoku. The garrison was erected in response to attempts by Russian agent Georg Anton Schäffer to build a fort on Oahu. Measuring three hundred yards on one side, the coral-rock structure was mounted with about forty guns including numerous cannons and was garrisoned with Hawaiian soldiers trained by Kamehameha I. Beckley implemented the tradition of wearing Western uniforms, gaining the name "Humehume" (cover up) by the Hawaiians. Previously the native soldiers only wore the traditional malo (loincloths).

Beckley died on April 16, 1826, in Honolulu. According to the journals of American missionary Levi Chamberlain:

He was buried agreeably to his wish within his own enclosure. A vault was dug within the walls of an unfinished house; and inclosed [sic] with bricks & lined with mats. A part of the church buryal [sic] service was read by Mr. Bingham, who afterwards made a short address to the bystanders both in English & Hawaii & closed with prayer.

His remains were later removed to the Oahu Cemetery where many of his descendants are also interred. A gravestone corresponding to Beckley's lifespan, although not his most recognized name, bears the inscription "Fredrick Beckley March 5, 1787 Died 1827".

== Creation of the Hawaiian flag ==
Flag of Hawaii

In 1801, the modern Union Jack replaced the former King James Union Jack. Inspired by the many British vessels that visited Hawaii, King Kamehameha commissioned a flag of his own. The exact designer of the flag is disputed between Captain Beckley and Alexander Adams, another of the British captains under Kamehameha's service. The tradition of the Beckley family maintained that Captain Beckley designed the Hawaiian flag in 1806 or 1807 and used it in his trading missions between Hawaii, China and Mexico. According to historian Albert Pierce Taylor, whose wife was a descendant of the English sea captain, he "was undoubtedly the originator of the flag of Hawaii". His journal or logbook was lost by his descendants during the 19th-century, although family records claimed that the flag was fashioned into a frock used by his children and passed down as a family heirloom. The final flag had a combination of British and American flag elements, and had one stripe for each of the Hawaiian islands. It was intended to show the neutrality of the Hawaiian Kingdom during the war between the two vital, English speaking trade partners. King Kamehameha was greatly impressed by the flag and had it flown above his residence. The flag went on to become the flag for Kingdom of Hawaii and later the State of Hawaii.

== Family and children ==
In 1813, he married Elizabeth Ahia (1797–1854), a Hawaiian high chiefess. She was the daughter of Kahakuʻi-i-ka-waiea, high priest of the heiau of Puʻu o Maneʻo at Honokane, Kohala, and was granddaughter of Kahānui who with his twin sister Kahaʻopulani hid and reared Kamehameha during his infancy. When her father was charged with building Kamehameha's war canoes, Ahia served as the religious moa (mascot) for the blessing of the fleet. Known to be a haughty woman, she accompanied Beckley on his many trips to sea and dressed in both Spanish and Hawaiian fashions. She was required to "kolokolo" or crawl in the presence of her husband after Beckley's royal elevation in 1815. Their hapa-haole (part-Hawaiian) descendants were regarded as members of the aliʻi (noble) class during the Hawaiian monarchy. Beckley recorded the births of their six children in his family Episcopal prayer book:

1. William Charles Malulani Beckley (1814–1871), who was brought up alongside Kauikeaouli, the future Kamehameha III. His first wife was High Chiefess Ahuenaikamakahonu-i-kaiakekua Beckley, also known as Kamakahonu Wahine, a relative of Naihe and High Chiefess Kapiʻolani. After her death, he married Kahinu, daughter of Hoʻolulu. Their children included Frederick William Kahapula Beckley Sr. (namesake of Beckley Street in Kalihi, Honolulu), Maria Kahaʻawelani Beckley, and George Charles Moʻoheau Beckley. His third wife was Mary Ann Kameʻehiwa Tressilyan Beckley, considered "The Rose of the Pacific".
2. Maria Kaiponui Kaipoliilii Beckley (1817–1887), also known as Maria Beckley Kamakahonu, who married High Chief Kamakahonu, chief of Kualoa, Oahu. They had a son, George Kekapalahaole II. Kamakahonu traveled to California during the California Gold Rush and died there, leaving Maria a widow. On her deathbed, Maria married Edmund (or Henry) Kistler, who reportedly induced her to transfer her property to him and, after her death, left for San Francisco with her possessions, including her father's diary and personal records.
3. Nancy Luhana Beckley (1818–?), who married Ahia, a captain of King Kamehameha III's third guard. She died after the birth of their son Abraham Ahia.
4. Mary Kekahimoku Kolimoalani Beckley (1820–1850), who married Abraham Henry Fayerweather. Their children included Julia Fayerweather Afong, William Malulani Fayerweather, Mary Jane Kekulani Fayerweather, and Hannah Fayerweather Bell.
5. George Frederick Hoapili Beckley (1823–1868).
6. Emmeline Maria Guadalupe Beckley (1825–1850), who was born at sea while the family was returning from Mexico to Hawaii. She was named in honor of Guadalupe Victoria by the Mexican president's daughter. She married American ship chandler George Ward Punchard (1816–1852) on July 23, 1842, and had descendants.

Four of Beckley’s great-grandsons served overseas during World War I: George Healiʻi Kāhea Beckley and George Hoapili Beckley Jr. served in the British Army, Benjamin Pitman Kāhea Beckley served with Canadian forces, and Henry Hoʻolulu Pitman Beckley served with the American Red Cross in Siberia.

== Bibliography ==
- Alexander, William DeWitt (1912). "The Birth of Kamehameha I". Nineteenth Annual Report of the Hawaiian Historical Society for the Year 1911. 19. Honolulu: Hawaiian Historical Society: 6–8. hdl:10524/11853.
- Alexander, William DeWitt (1898). "The Maker of the Hawaiian Flag". Sixth Annual Report of the Hawaiian Historical Society for the Year 1898. Honolulu: Hawaiian Historical Society: 8–11.
- Bacchilega, Cristina (2011). Legendary Hawaiʻi and the Politics of Place: Tradition, Translation, and Tourism. Philadelphia: University of Pennsylvania Press. ISBN 978-0-8122-0117-8. OCLC 759158207.
- Bouslog, Charles; Greig, Thelma (1994). Mānoa: the Story of a Valley. Honolulu: Mutual Publishing. ISBN 978-1-56647-067-4. OCLC 32599587.
- Dye, Bob (1997). Merchant Prince of the Sandalwood Mountains: Afong and the Chinese in Hawaiʻi. Honolulu: University of Hawaii Press. ISBN 978-0-8248-1772-5. OCLC 247424976.
- Handy, E. S. Craighill (1941). "The Hawaiian cult of Io". The Journal of the Polynesian Society. 50 (199). Wellington: The Polynesian Society: 134–159. OCLC 6015277417. Archived from the original on February 10, 2018.
- Hopkins, Jaime Uluwehi (August 2012). Hānau Ma Ka Lolo, For the Benefit of Her Race: a Portrait of Emma Kaʻilikapuolono Metcalf Beckley Nakuina (PDF) (Thesis). Honolulu: University of Hawaii at Manoa. hdl:10125/100964.
- Kamakau, Samuel (1992) [1961]. Ruling Chiefs of Hawaii (Revised ed.). Honolulu: Kamehameha Schools Press. ISBN 0-87336-014-1.
- Kuykendall, Ralph Simpson (1965) [1938]. The Hawaiian Kingdom 1778–1854, Foundation and Transformation. Vol. 1. Honolulu: University of Hawaii Press. ISBN 0-87022-431-X. OCLC 47008868.
- McKinzie, Edith Kawelohea (1983). Stagner, Ishmael W. (ed.). Hawaiian Genealogies: Extracted from Hawaiian Language Newspapers. Vol. 1. Honolulu: University of Hawaii Press. ISBN 0-939154-28-5. OCLC 12555087.
- Pukui, Mary Kawena; Elbert, Samuel H.; Mookini, Esther T. (1974). Place Names of Hawaii. Honolulu: University of Hawaii Press. ISBN 978-0-8248-0524-1. OCLC 1042464.
- Restarick, Henry Bond (1924). Hawaii, 1778–1920, from the Viewpoint of a Bishop: Being the Story of English and American Churchmen in Hawaii with Historical Sidelights. Honolulu: Paradise of the Pacific. OCLC 1337282.
- Taylor, Albert Pierce (1922). Under Hawaiian Skies: A Narrative of the Romance, Adventure and History of the Hawaiian Islands. Honolulu: Advertiser Publishing Company, Ltd. OCLC 479709.
- Topolinski, John Renken Kahaʻi (February 1976). "Musical Diggings – The Sumner Family, A Legacy of Family Mele and Chants". Haʻilono Mele. II (2). Honolulu: The Hawaiian Music Foundation: 2–6.
- Topolinski, John Renken Kahaʻi (1981). "Nancy Sumner, Hawaiian Courtlady". Hawaiian Journal of History. 15. Honolulu: Hawaiian Historical Society: 50–58. hdl:10524/285.
