= Royal Mausoleum (Mauna ʻAla) =

- U.S. National Register of Historic Places
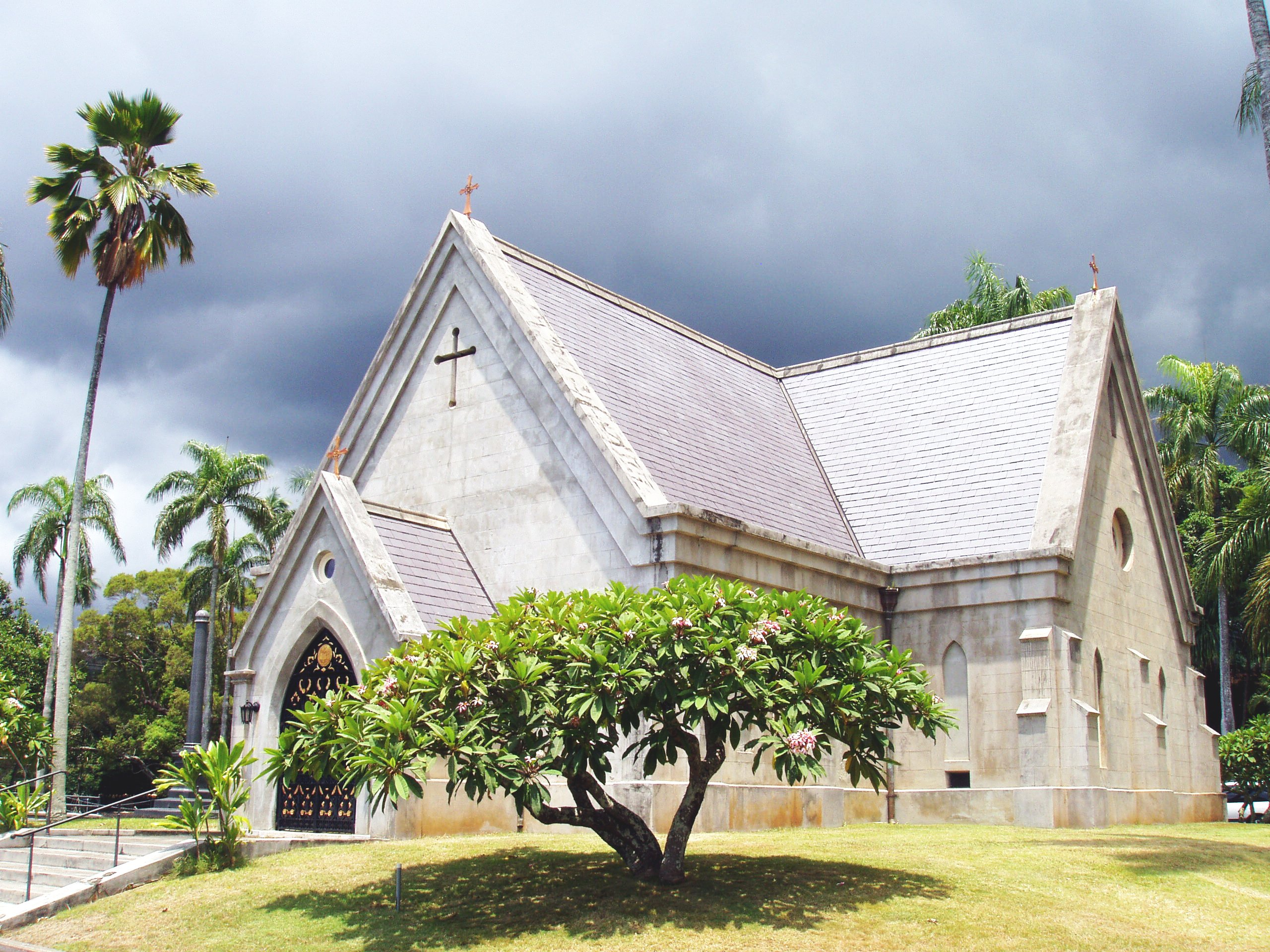
- The main building is now a chapel

- Location within Hawaii
- Location: 2261 Nuʻuanu Ave., Honolulu, Hawaii
- Coordinates: 21°19′31″N 157°50′50″W
- Area: 3.34 acres (1.35 ha)
- Built: 1863
- Architect: Theodore C. Heuck
- Architectural style: Gothic
- NRHP reference No.: 72000422
- Added to NRHP: August 7, 1972

Mauna ʻAla (Fragrant Hills) in the Hawaiian language, is the Royal Mausoleum of Hawaii (also called Royal Mausoleum State Monument) and the final resting place of Hawaii's two prominent royal families: the Kamehameha Dynasty and the Kalākaua Dynasty.

== Background ==
In the early 19th century, the area near an ancient burial site was known as Pohukaina. It is believed to be the name of a chief (sometimes spelled Pahukaina) who according to legend chose a cave in Kanehoalani in the Koʻolau Range for his resting place. The land belonged to Kekauluohi, who later ruled as Kuhina Nui, as part of her birthright.

After 1825, the first Western-style royal tomb was constructed for the bodies of King Kamehameha II and his queen Kamāmalu near the current ʻIolani Palace. They were buried on August 23, 1825. The idea was heavily influenced by the tombs at Westminster Abbey during Kamehameha II's trip to London. The mausoleum was a small house made of coral blocks with a thatched roof. It had no windows, and it was the duty of two chiefs to guard the iron-locked koa door day and night. No one was allowed to enter the vault except for burials or Memorial Day, a Hawaiian holiday celebrated on December 30. Over time, as more bodies were added, the small vault became crowded, so other chiefs and retainers were buried in unmarked graves nearby. In 1865 a selected eighteen coffins were removed to the Royal Mausoleum named Mauna ʻAla in Nuʻuanu Valley. But many chiefs remain on the site including: Keaweʻīkekahialiʻiokamoku, Kalaniʻōpuʻu, Chiefess Kapiʻolani, and Haʻalilio.

Prior to the 19th century, the remains of aliʻi of Hawaiʻi island were buried at Hale o Keawe and Hale o Līloa. Other Western-style tombs include a burial site at Honolulu Fort which was lost when the fort was demolished in 1857, a tomb in Lahaina located near Halekamani, and a tomb on the island of Mokuʻula in Lahaina. The royal remains from the last two burial sites were transferred to the cemetery of Waiola Church in 1884.

== Construction ==
The 2.75-acre (11,000 m^{2}) mausoleum was designed by architect Theodore Heuck. By 1862, the Royal Tomb at Pohukaina was full and there were no space for the coffins of Prince Albert, who died August 27, 1862, and King Kamehameha IV, who died November 30, 1863. Kamehameha IV's funeral was delayed for three months while a new mausoleum was built.

Immediately Kamehameha V, brother of Kamehameha IV, started construction of a new mausoleum building in the Nuʻuanu Valley on a site chosen by Kamehameha IV and his wife Queen Emma. The Right Reverend Thomas Nettleship Staley, first Anglican Bishop of Honolulu (1823–1898), oversaw construction. The west (ʻEwa) wing was completed at the end of January 1864. A large funeral procession February 3, 1864, brought the body of Kamehameha IV from ʻIolani Palace. His casket was placed on a stand in the new wing. Later in the evening, bearers brought the casket of Ka Haku o Hawaiʻi (as Prince Albert was known) and laid him to rest alongside his father. Queen Emma was so overcome with grief that she camped on the grounds of Mauna ʻAla, and slept in the mausoleum.

The mausoleum was completed in 1865, adjacent to the public 1844 Oahu Cemetery. The mausoleum seemed a fitting place to bury other past monarchs of the Kingdom of Hawaii and their families. The remains of past deceased royals were transferred in a torchlit ceremony at night leading from Pohukaina to the Nuʻuanu Valley on October 30, 1865.

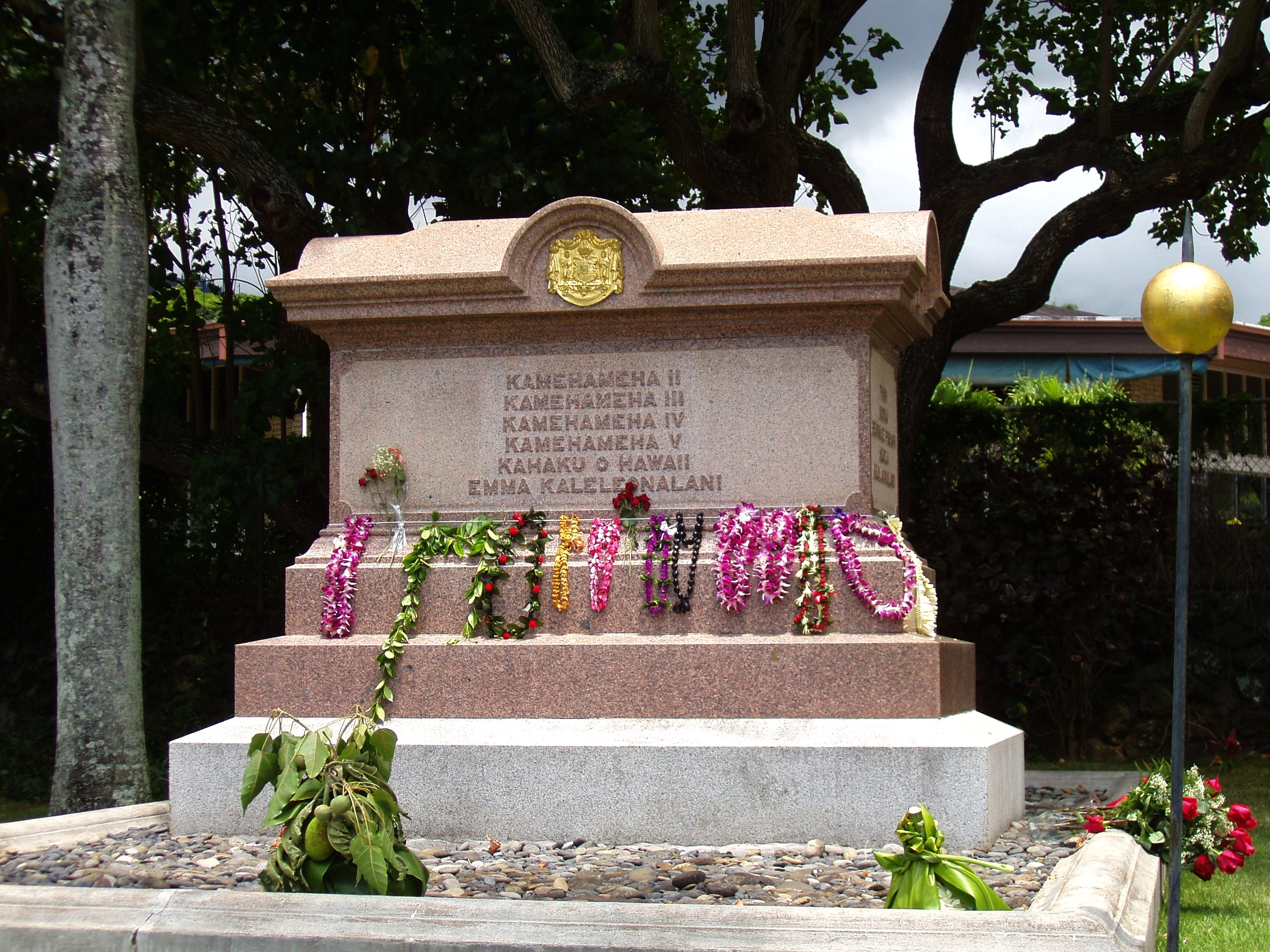
Kamehameha Dynasty Tomb

Robert Crichton Wyllie, Minister of Foreign Affairs, was buried here in October 1865. Over time, the remains of almost all of Hawaii's monarchs, their consorts, and various princes and princesses would rest at the Royal Mausoleum.

Kamehameha I and William Charles Lunalilo are the only two kings not resting at the mausoleum. Lunalilo, the shortest-reigning Hawaiian monarch (one year and 25 days only), was buried in the Lunalilo Tomb in the church cemetery in the courtyard of Kawaiahaʻo Church. Princess Nāhiʻenaʻena and Queen Keōpūolani are buried on Maui at Waiola Church.

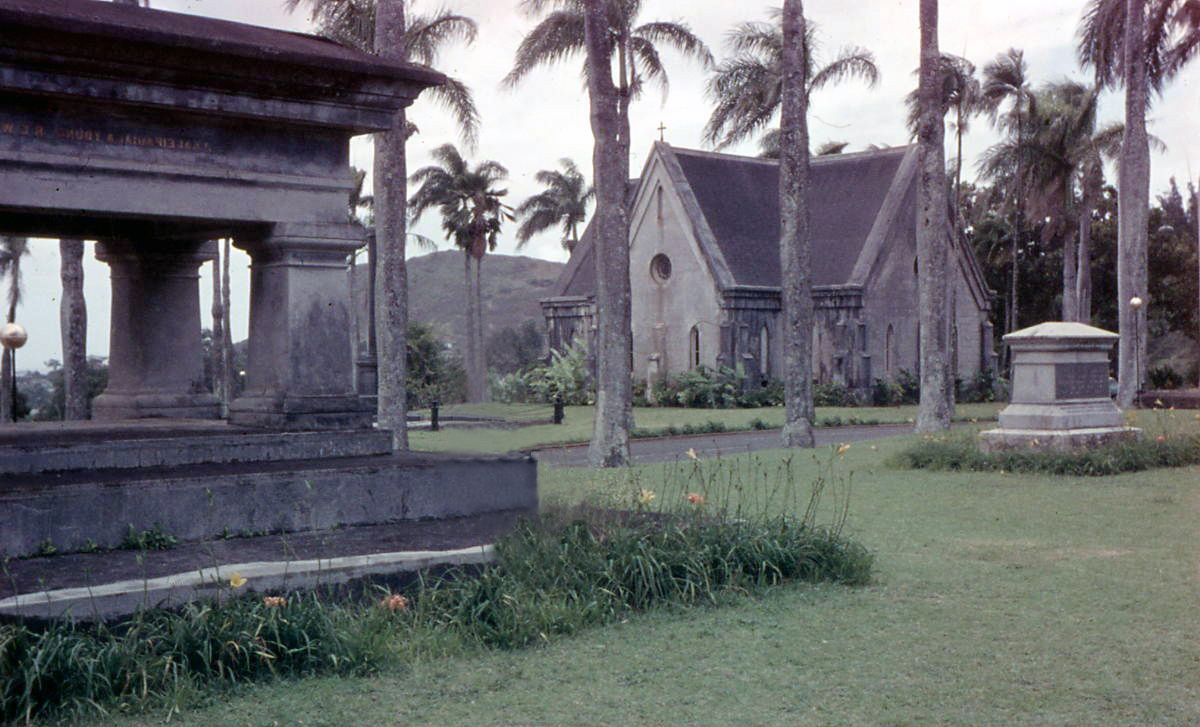
Mausoleum as seen in 1958

Kamehameha I's remains were hidden in a traditional practice to preserve the mana (power) of the aliʻi at the time of the Hawaiian religion. For several generations, descendants of Hoʻolulu, one of the few chosen to help bury the remains of Kamehameha, have been appointed as caretakers.

=== Additional modifications ===
On November 9, 1887, after the main mausoleum building became too crowded, the caskets belonging to members of the Kamehameha Dynasty were moved to the newly built Kamehameha Tomb, an underground vault commissioned by Charles Reed Bishop, husband of Bernice Pauahi Bishop. The Territory of Hawaii built a second underground crypt, the Wyllie Tomb (formerly known as the Queen Emma Tomb) in 1904 to separate the caskets of Robert Crichton Wyllie and the relatives of Queen Emma. In 1907, the Territory of Hawaii allocated $20,000 for the construction of a separate underground vault for the Kalākaua family. Queen Liliʻuokalani and Prince Jonah Kūhiō Kalanianaʻole were consulted in the construction process. On June 24, 1910, the caskets from the Kalākaua family were moved to newly constructed Kalākaua Crypt in a torchlit nighttime ceremony supervised by the former queen.

In 1922 the main building was converted to a chapel after the last royal remains were moved to tombs constructed on the grounds. The chapel was added to the National Register of Historic Places on August 7, 1972.

In 2023, Abigail Kinoiki Kekaulike Kawānanakoa (1926–2022) became the most recent person to be buried in the Royal Mausoleum. Prior to her death there had not been a burial at the Royal Mausoleum since David Kalākaua Kawānanakoa in 1953. A new tomb was constructed since the Kalākaua vault was at capacity.

== Legal status ==
Mauna ʻAla was removed from the public lands of the United States by a joint resolution of Congress in 1900, two years after the annexation in 1898 of Hawaii by the Newlands Resolution and President William McKinley.

The Mausoleum is one of the only places in Hawaii where the state flag of Hawaii can officially fly alone without the flag of United States. The other three locations are ‘Iolani Palace, the Puʻuhonua o Hōnaunau Heiau and Thomas Square.

== Kahu of the Royal Mausoleum ==
These are the keepers or kahu of the Royal Mausoleum at Mauna Ala:

- Nahalau, till 1873
- Joseph Keaoa, from July 10, 1873
- Haumea, from May 3, 1878
- Pius F. Koakanu, until March, 1885
- Lanihau, from March 6, 1885
- Keano, from July 31, 1886
- Poʻomaikelani (1839–1895), from October 15, 1888, as Guardian of the Royal Tombs

- Naholowaʻa, from September 17, 1888, as curator/custodian under Princess Poʻomaikelani
- Cain D. Wiliokai (mentioned in Queen Liliʻuokalani's diary entry), until March 24, 1893

- Maria Angela Kahaʻawelani Beckley Kahea (1847–1909), from March 24, 1893, to July 11, 1909
- David Kaipeʻelua Kahea (1845–1921), from March 24, 1893, to 1915 (jointly with wife)
- Frederick Malulani Beckley Kahea (1882–1949), from 1915 to 1947
- William Edward Bishop Kaiheʻekai Taylor (1882–1956), from 1947 to 1956
- Emily Kekahaloa Namauʻu Taylor, from 1956 to 1961
- ʻIolani Luahine, from 1961 to 1965
- Lydia Namahanaikaleleokalani Taylor Maiʻoho, from 1966 to 1994
- William "Bill" John Kaiheʻekai Maiʻoho, from 1995 to 2015
- William Bishop Kaiheʻekai "Kai" Maiʻoho, from 2015 to May 1, 2023

=== Disputed succession ===
Following Kai Maiʻoho's departure, his first cousin James Maiʻoho (grandson of Lydia Maiʻoho) served as an unpaid interim caretaker and was one of four finalists for the curator position. In 2024, the Hawaii Department of Land and Natural Resources instead appointed Donni Chong as curator. The appointment broke with the tradition under which generations of the Beckley Kahea, Taylor and Maiʻoho families had served as kahu. Chong was neither a lineal descendant of these families nor had she trained under a previous kahu. The controversy prompted proposals to transfer management of Mauna ʻAla away from DLNR. By 2026, members of the traditional caretaker family recognized James Maiʻoho as kahu, while Chong remained the state-appointed curator.

Legislation proposed transferring oversight from DLNR to an independent commission representing the Aliʻi Trusts, Hawaiian Royal Societies and other Hawaiian organizations, which would establish a process for selecting the kahu. Lawmakers instead advanced a working group to study the management of Mauna ʻAla and recommend a new oversight entity by 2028.

== See also ==
- List of burials at the Royal Mausoleum of Hawaii
- Thomas Nettleship Staley First Anglican Bishop of Honolulu

== Bibliography ==
- Kaeo, Peter; Queen Emma (1976). Korn, Alfons L. (ed.). News from Molokai, Letters Between Peter Kaeo & Queen Emma, 1873–1876. Honolulu: The University Press of Hawaii. hdl:10125/39980. ISBN 978-0-8248-0399-5. OCLC 2225064.
- Kam, Ralph Thomas (2017). Death Rites and Hawaiian Royalty: Funerary Practices in the Kamehameha and Kalakaua Dynasties, 1819–1953. S. I.: McFarland, Incorporated, Publishers. ISBN 978-1-4766-6846-8. OCLC 966566652.
- Parker, David "Kawika" (2008). "Crypts of the Ali`i The Last Refuge of the Hawaiian Royalty". Tales of Our Hawaiʻi (PDF). Honolulu: Alu Like, Inc. OCLC 309392477. Archived from the original (PDF) on November 11, 2013.
