= Hoʻolulu =

Member of the nobility during the Kingdom of Hawaiʻi (1794–1844)

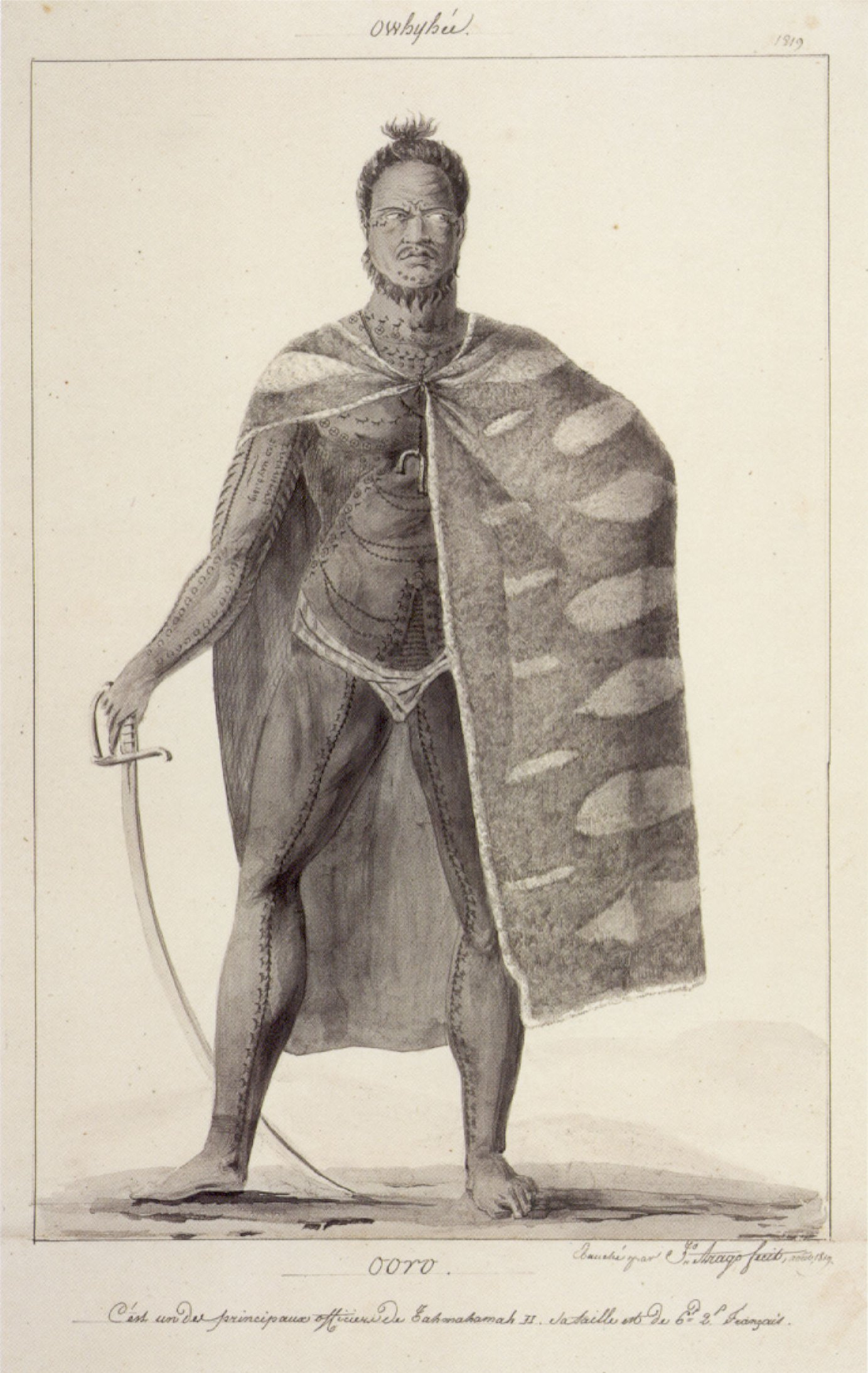
- Ooro (French spelling) by Jacques Arago 1819
- Born: c. 1794
- Died: 1844
- Spouse: Charlotte Halaki Kahepakekapuikaailani Cox
- Issue: Kaiheʻekai; Kinoʻoleoliliha; Moʻoheau-nui-i-Kaaiawaawa-o-ʻUlu; Kahinu
- Father: Kameʻeiamoku
- Mother: Kahikoloa

Hoʻolulu (c. 1794–1844) was a member of the nobility during the formation of the Kingdom of Hawaii. He was a trusted advisor to King Kamehameha I, also known as "Kamehameha the Great", and was one of the select few to know his secret resting place. His descendants continue the tradition of guarding royal burials. A major cultural site in Hilo, Hawaii is named after him.

== Life ==
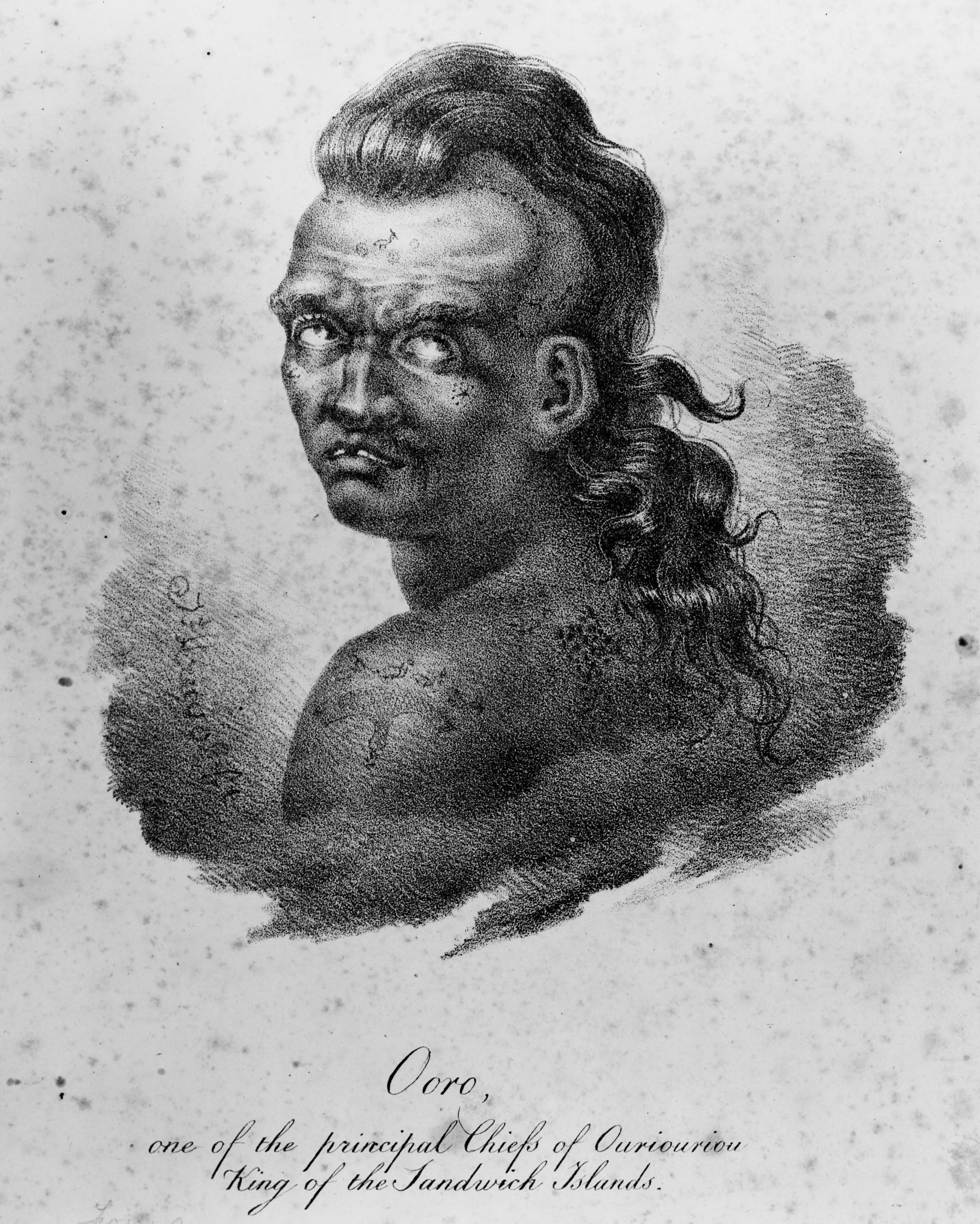
Another depiction by Arago 1819

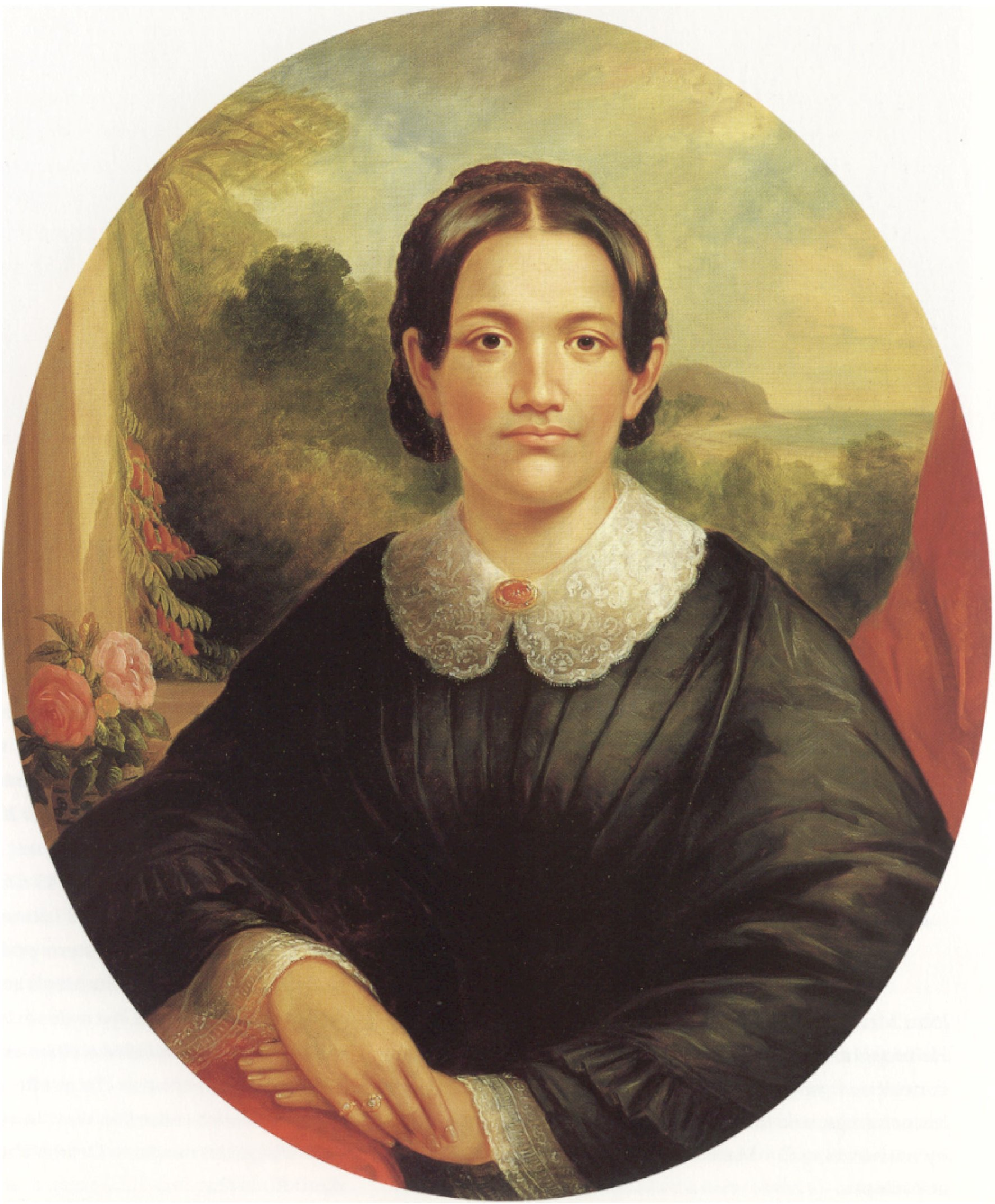
Painting of daughter Kinoʻoleoliliha

He was born around 1794; his mother was Kahikoloa and his father was one of the "Royal Twins" who supported Kamehameha in his military battles, Kameʻeiamoku. He became known as ho'o lulu which means "to lie in the sheltered waters" in the Hawaiian language. When Kamehameha died in 1819, his last wishes were to have his remains hidden in a secret place so they would not be defiled by the foreign visitors who were already looting other burial sites. Hoʻolulu and his half-brother Ulumāheihei Hoapili were the only two trusted with this honor.

He is one of the principal chiefs who met Louis de Freycinet on his 1819 visit.

Hoʻolulu died around 1844.

== Marriage ==
Around 1825 Hoʻolulu married Chiefess Charlotte Halaki Kahepakekapuikaailani Cox (1805–1845) whose father was Englishman Harold Cox and mother was High Chiefess Namahana of Moana. They had two daughters and two sons.

Son Kaiheʻekai (died 1865) took the Christian name "John Harold" and married Chiefess Namahana III also known as Namahana Kaleleonalani or by a Christian name of Lydia. Namahana III was a grandniece of powerful Queen Kaʻahumanu. They had a daughter Miriam Auhea Kekāuluohi (1839–1899), named for the Kuhina Nui (co-regent) at the time, Kekāuluohi. Auhea Kekāuluohi was mentioned as betrothed to Prince Lunalilo, but instead would marry American William Isaac, (or Jesse) Crowningburg (who claimed relationship to a Duke of Königsberg) and then after a divorce and his death, remarry Paul Kamai in 1873. After Lunalilo's death during his short reign as King, Miriam was considered to have a claim to the throne herself. She never contested the closer connections of the other contenders: Queen Emma, Bernice Pauahi Bishop, and Ruth Keʻelikōlani.

Daughter Kinoʻoleoliliha (1827–1855) married American businessman Benjamin Pitman. Not much is known of son Moʻoheau-nui-i-Kaʻaiawaʻawa-o-ʻUlu (1828–1845). Daughter Kahinu o-Kekuaokalani-i-Lekeleke (1829–after 1853) married William Beckley (1814–1871) son of George Charles Beckley, who is sometimes credited with designing the Flag of Hawaii. Their son Fredrick William Bekley served as Royal Governor of Kauaʻi in 1880.

In 1893, a small caretaker's house called Hale Hoʻolulu was built at the Royal Mausoleum of Hawaii. A descendant has lived in it for six generations to continue the tradition of guarding the tombs of Hawaiian royalty. William John Kaiheʻekai Maiʻoho was appointed to that position in 1995 and died in 2015. Following his death, son William Bishop Kaiheʻekai "Kai" Maiʻoho served as Kahu from 2015 to May 1, 2023.

His granddaughter Auhea Kekāuluohi named a street in Honolulu at 21°16′44″N 157°48′42″W for him. A valley and stream 22°12′2″N 159°36′31″W on the island of Kauaʻi also shares the same name.

Hoʻolulu Park, a large park complex in Hilo at 19°43′9″N 155°4′3″W is named for him. It includes the Afook-Chinen Civic Auditorium, Walter Victor Baseball Complex, Dr. Francis F.C. Wong Stadium, Sally Kaleohano's Luʻau Hale, Edith Kanakaole Multi-Purpose Stadium and Sparky Kawamoto Swim Stadium. Some of the venues host sporting events of the University of Hawai‘i at Hilo.

Hoʻolulu Park is also the location of the annual Merrie Monarch Festival, named in honor of King Kalākaua, the great grand-nephew of Hoʻolulu, The auditorium is named for coach Ung-Soy "Beans" Afook and athlete and promoter Richard "Pablo" Chinen who both died in 1991. The park is the setting of at least one fiction book.
