= Henry Hoʻolulu Pitman =

American Civil War soldier

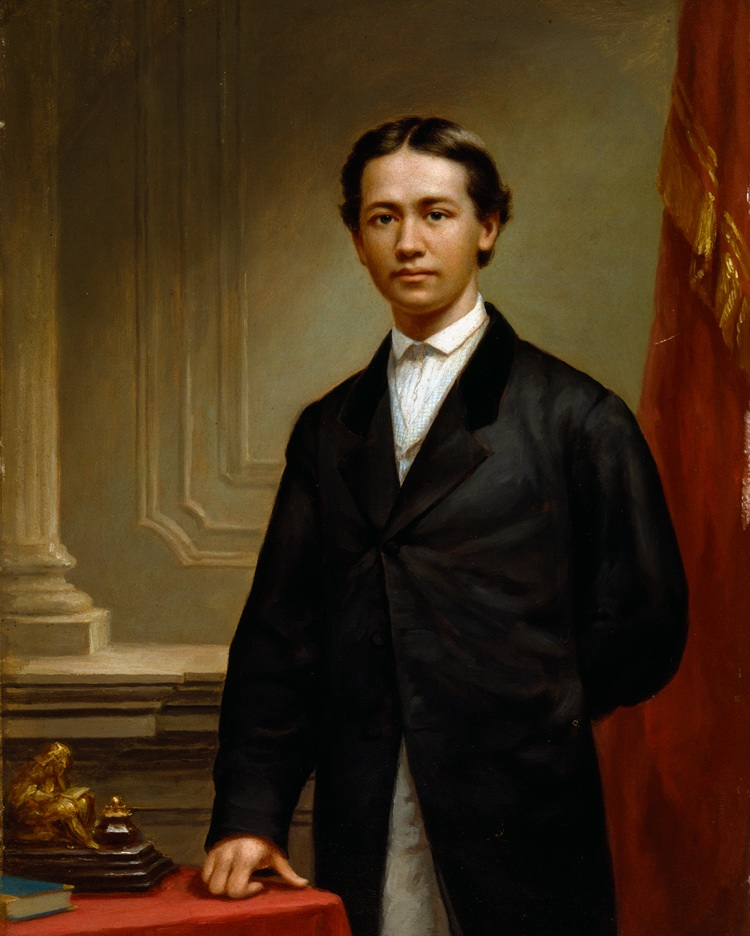
- Portrait of Henry Hoʻolulu Pitman at the Peabody Essex Museum
- Born: March 18, 1845; Hilo, Kingdom of Hawaiʻi
- Died: February 27, 1863 (aged 17); Camp Parole, Maryland, U.S.
- Burial place: Mount Auburn Cemetery
- Relatives: Benjamin Pitman (father); Kinoʻoleoliliha (mother); Mary Pitman Ailau (sister)
- Military career
- Allegiance: United States
- Branch: United States Army
- Service years: 1862–1863
- Rank: Private
- Unit: 22nd Regiment Massachusetts Volunteer Infantry
- Conflicts: American Civil War (POW); Maryland Campaign; Battle of Antietam; Battle of Shepherdstown

Timothy Henry Hoʻolulu Pitman (March 18, 1845 – February 27, 1863) was an American Union Army soldier of Native Hawaiian descent. Considered one of the "Hawaiʻi Sons of the Civil War", he was among a group of more than one hundred documented Native Hawaiian and Hawaii-born combatants who fought in the American Civil War while the Kingdom of Hawaiʻi was still an independent nation.

Born and raised in Hilo, Hawaiʻi, he was the eldest son of Kinoʻoleoliliha, a Hawaiian high chiefess, and Benjamin Pitman, an American pioneer settler from Massachusetts. Through his father's business success in the whaling and sugar and coffee plantation industries and his mother's familial connections to the Hawaiian royal family, the Pitmans were quite prosperous and owned lands on the island of Hawaiʻi and in Honolulu. He and his older sister Mary were educated in the mission schools in Hilo alongside other children of mixed Hawaiian descent. After the death of his mother in 1855, his father remarried to the widow of a missionary, thus connecting the family to the American missionary community in Hawaiʻi. However, following the deaths of his first wife and later his second wife, his father decided to leave the islands and returned to Massachusetts with his family in 1861. The younger Pitman continued his education in the public schools around Boston.

Leaving school without his family's knowledge, he made the decision to fight in the Civil War in August 1862. Despite his mixed-race ancestry, Pitman avoided the racial segregation imposed on other Native Hawaiian recruits of the time and enlisted in the 22nd Regiment Massachusetts Volunteer Infantry, a white regiment. He served as a private in the Union Army fighting in the Battle of Antietam and the Maryland Campaign. In his company, Private Robert G. Carter befriended the part-Hawaiian soldier and wrote in later life of their common experience in the 22nd Massachusetts. Compiled decades afterward from old letters, Carter's account described the details surrounding his final fate in the war. On the march to Fredericksburg, Pitman was separated from his regiment and captured by Confederate guerrilla forces. He was forced to march to Richmond and incarcerated in the Confederate Libby Prison, where he contracted "lung fever" from the harsh conditions of his imprisonment and died on February 27, 1863, a few months after his release on parole in a prisoner exchange. Modern historians consider Henry Hoʻolulu Pitman to be the only known Hawaiian or Pacific Islander to die as a prisoner of war in the Civil War.

For a period of time after the end of the war, the legacy and contributions of Pitman and other documented Hawaiian participants in the American Civil War were largely forgotten except in the private circles of descendants and historians. However, there has been a revival of interest in recent years in the Hawaiian community. In 2010, these "Hawaiʻi Sons of the Civil War" were commemorated with a bronze plaque erected along the memorial pathway at the National Memorial Cemetery of the Pacific in Honolulu.

== Early life and family ==
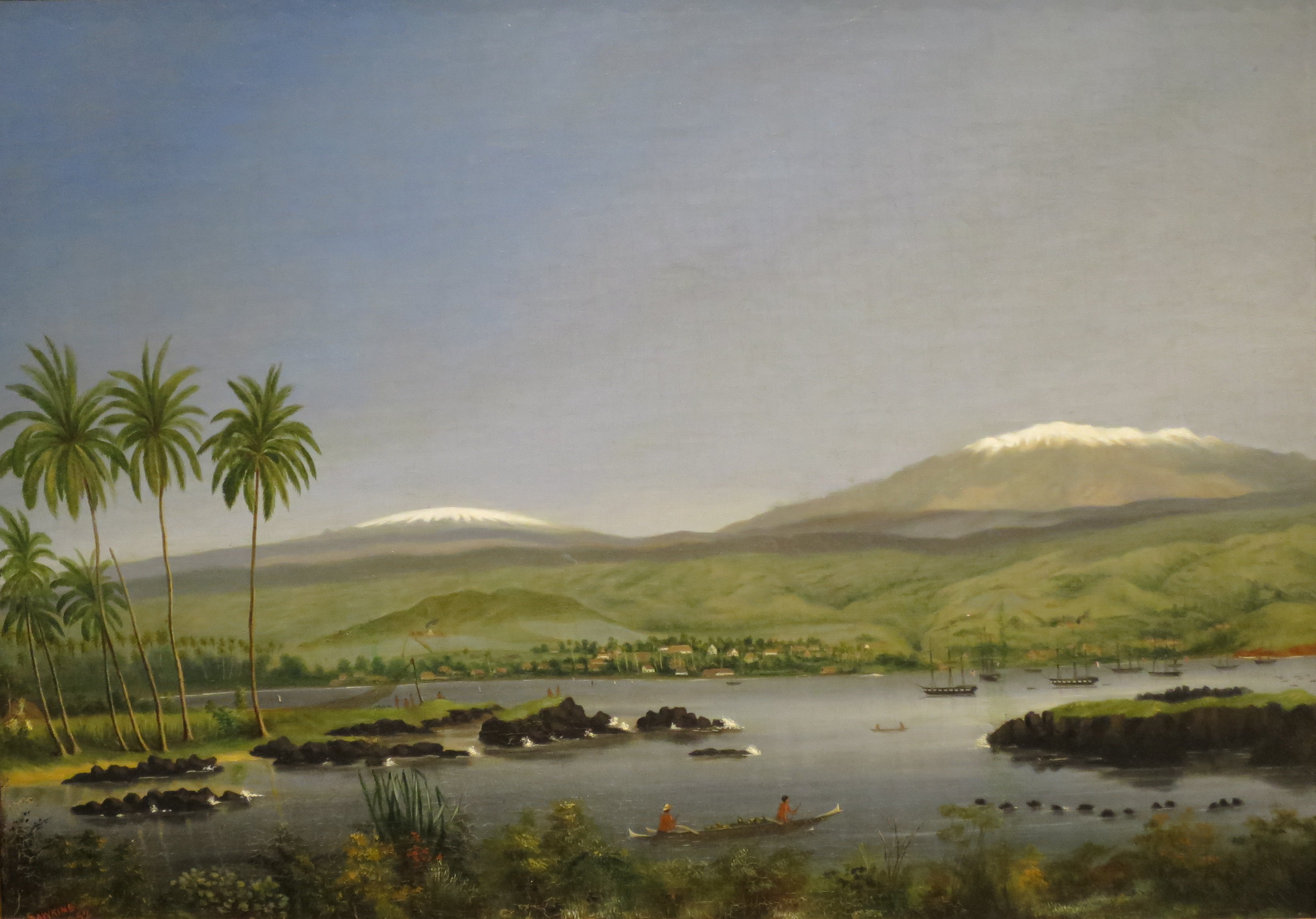
Hilo from the Bay, oil painting by British geologist James Gay Sawkins, 1852

Timothy Henry Hoʻolulu Pitman (Note: His name is given in various ways in the sources. On one side of the Pitman family grave marker at Mount Auburn Cemetery is inscribed "Timothy Henry Pitman", and his enlistment records list him under "Timothy H. Pitman". In the 1860 United States census, his name is recorded as "Henry Pitman". In Hawaiʻi, his name was written as "T. Henry Pitman" in the Annual Report of the Hawaiian Mission Children's Society, as "Henry Pitman" in his English obituary in The Pacific Commercial Advertiser and as "Henry Hoolulu Pitman (Pikimana)" in the Hawaiian newspaper Ka Nupepa Kuokoa.) was born March 18, 1845, in Hilo, Hawaiʻi, the first son and second child of Benjamin Pitman and Kinoʻoleoliliha. (Note: Sources differ on his birth year. Historian Peggy Kai presents 1843 as his birth year. The Pitman family marker at Mount Auburn gives March 18, 1845, as his birth date, with the age of death as seventeen years, 11 months, and 9 days. His obituary in Boston's Evening Saturday Gazette stated his age was seventeen years, 11 months, and 7 days. The Honolulu newspaper The Pacific Commercial Advertiser stated he was about twenty years of age when he died.) Originally a native of Salem, Massachusetts, Pitman's father was an early pioneer, businessman and sugar and coffee plantation owner on the island of Hawaiʻi, who profited greatly from the kingdom's booming whaling industry in the early 1800s. On his father's side, he was a great-grandson of Joshua Pitman, an English-American carpenter on the ship Franklin under Captain Allen Hallett during the American Revolutionary War. On his mother's side, Pitman was a descendant of Kameʻeiamoku, one of the royal twins (with Kamanawa) who advised Kamehameha I in his conquest of the Hawaiian Islands, and also of the early American or English sea captain Harold Cox, who lent his name to George "Cox" Kahekili Keʻeaumoku II, the Governor of Maui. Henry Hoʻolulu Pitman shared his Hawaiian name with his maternal grandfather Hoʻolulu who, along with his brother Hoapili, helped conceal the bones of King Kamehameha I in a secret hiding place after his death. In the Hawaiian language, the name "Hoʻolulu" means "to lie in the sheltered waters". His siblings were Mary Pitman Ailau, Benjamin Franklin Keolaokalani Pitman and half-sister Maria Kinoʻole Pitman Morey.

Because of his father's success in business and his mother's descent from Hawaiian royalty, the Pitman family was considered quite prosperous and were host to the royal family when they visited Hilo. Besides being one of the leading merchants in town, his father also served the government as district magistrate of Hilo. Henry's mother, Kinoʻole, had inherited control over much of the lands in Hilo and Ōlaʻa from her own father, and King Kamehameha III had granted her use of the ahupuaʻa of Hilo after her marriage. During Henry's early childhood, the family lived in the mansion that Benjamin Pitman had built in 1840, in an area known as Niopola, one of the favored resort spots of ancient Hawaiian royalty. The residence also became known as the Spencer House after Pitman sold it to his business partner Captain Thomas Spencer. (Note: During the Civil War, Captain Thomas Spencer personally funded and drilled a company of infantry composed mostly of Native Hawaiians from Hilo. These volunteers, dubbed the "Spencer's Invincibles", offered their services to President Lincoln and the Union. However, in order to avert diplomatic controversy and in defense of the Hawaiʻi's neutrality, King Kamehameha IV and Minister Robert Crichton Wyllie officially denied permission for the men to go as a unit. When Captain Spencer heard the news, he reportedly burst into tears.) The property later became the site of the Hilo Hotel, built in 1888 and torn down in 1956. (Note: During a trip to Hawaiʻi in 1917, Almira Hollander Pitman, his sister-in-law, wrote "The hotel in Hilo is the old home of the Pitmans, and Dad [Benjamin Keolaokalani Pitman] remembered it all. Of course the old garden is nearly gone, and houses are built on the grounds, but many of the old trees are still growing.") In the 1850s the family moved to the capital of Honolulu where Benjamin Pitman took up banking and built a beautiful two-story house that he named Waialeale ("rippling water") at the corner of Alakea and Beretania Streets.

== Education ==
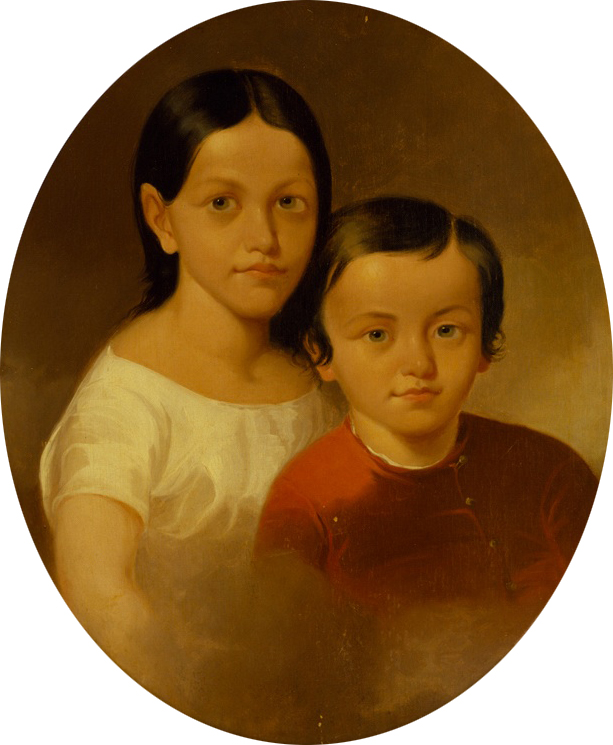
Portrait of Henry and his sister Mary, painting by John Mix Stanley, 1849

While in Hawaiʻi, Pitman and his older sister Mary attended Mrs. Wetmore's children's school in Hilo. The school was located at the Wetmores' residence on Church Street. Taught by Lucy Sheldon Taylor Wetmore, the wife of American missionary doctor and government physician Charles Hinckley Wetmore, who had come to Hawaii in 1848 with the American Board of Commissioners for Foreign Missions (ABCFM), the two elder Pitman children received their education in English rather than Hawaiian. This was unusual since Hawaiian was the official language of the Kingdom of Hawaiʻi, and all other schools in Hilo were conducted in the Hawaiian language. Mrs. Wetmore taught the children reading, writing, spelling, arithmetic and singing, while also reinforcing the curriculum with a strong adherence to the principles of the Protestant faith. Like the Pitman siblings, many of their classmates were also of half-Hawaiian (hapa-kanaka) descent with a majority of them being Chinese-Hawaiians (hapa-pake).

After the death of his mother Kinoʻole in 1855, Pitman's father remarried to Maria Louisa Walsworth Kinney, the widow of American missionary Rev. Henry Kinney. The Kinneys were part of the Twelfth Company of missionaries from the ABCFM to arrive in 1848. The marriage aligned the Pitman children with the American missionary community. They were called "cousins" by the children of the missionaries and considered part of the extended missionary family of Hawaiʻi. This first stepmother died in 1858 after giving birth to their father's fourth child, a daughter named Maria Kinoʻole (1858–1892). The Pitman family returned to Massachusetts in 1861 after his father remarried to his third wife Martha Ball Paddock, giving his four children another stepmother. Letters by traveler Sophia Cracroft, niece of Lady Jane Franklin, indicated that the Pitman family left for San Francisco, on June 25, 1861, aboard the ship Comet with Cracroft and Lady Franklin and that the elder Pitman "now has a third wife with a baby [Charles Brook Pitman]." According to an 1887 biography written by Robert G. Carter, a private who would later serve in the same company as Pitman, he was neglected after his mother's death by his father and stepmother, who "subjected [him] to neglect and treatment, that with his sensitive nature he could not bear". Carter stated that Pitman continued his education in the public schools of Roxbury, where the Pitman family lived for a period of time. He may have proceeded the rest of the family in leaving Hawaii because the 1860 United States census registered Pitman under his teacher Solomon Adams as residing and being educated in Newton, also in the Boston area. Adams and Rev. Jonathan Edwards Woodbridge ran a preparatory school for boys in the village of Auburndale in Newton.

Growing into adolescence, Pitman was said to strongly resemble his Hawaiian mother. His enlistment card during the war noted he had a dark complexion, hazel colored eyes, black hair and stood five feet eight inches. Robert G. Carter gave a brief description of his appearance in wartime letters first published in 1897: (Note: The description, along Pitman's one of the only detailed accounts of Henry Hoʻolulu Pitman's service in the Civil War, was originally written in a letter by an unnamed member of the artillery unit of the 22nd Regiment. Robert G. Carter compiled this and other letters in the 1870s. It was first published serially in the Maine Bugle from 1896 to 1898. In 1913 Carter published the whole work in his book Four Brothers in Blue, Or, Sunshine and Shadows of the War of the Rebellion: A Story of the Great Civil War from Bull Run to Appomattox.)

[A] tall, slim boy, straight as an arrow. His face was a perfect oval, his hair was as black as a raven's wing, and his eyes were large and of that peculiar soft, melting blackness, (Note: His enlistment card indicated he had "hazel" colored eyes.) which excites pity when one is in distress. His skin was a clear, dark olive, bordering on the swarthy, and this, with his high cheek bones, would have led us to suppose that his nationality was different from our own, had we not known that his name was plain Henry P. There was an air of good breeding and refinement about him, that, with his small hands and feet, would have set us to thinking, had it not been that in our youth and intensely enthusiastic natures, we gave no thought to our comrades' personal appearance. We can look back now and see the shy, reserved nature of the boy, the dark, melancholy eyes, the sad smile, the sensitive twitching of the lips.

== American Civil War ==
After the outbreak of the American Civil War, the Kingdom of Hawaiʻi under King Kamehameha IV declared its neutrality on August 26, 1861. But many Native Hawaiians and Hawaiian-born Americans (mainly descendants of the American missionaries), both abroad and in the islands, volunteered and enlisted in the military regiments of various states in the Union and the Confederacy. Individual Native Hawaiians had been serving in the United States Navy and Army since the War of 1812, and even more served during the Civil War. Many Hawaiians sympathized with the Union because of Hawaiʻi's ties to New England through its missionaries and the whaling industry, and the ideological opposition of many to the institution of slavery.

=== Enlistment and service ===
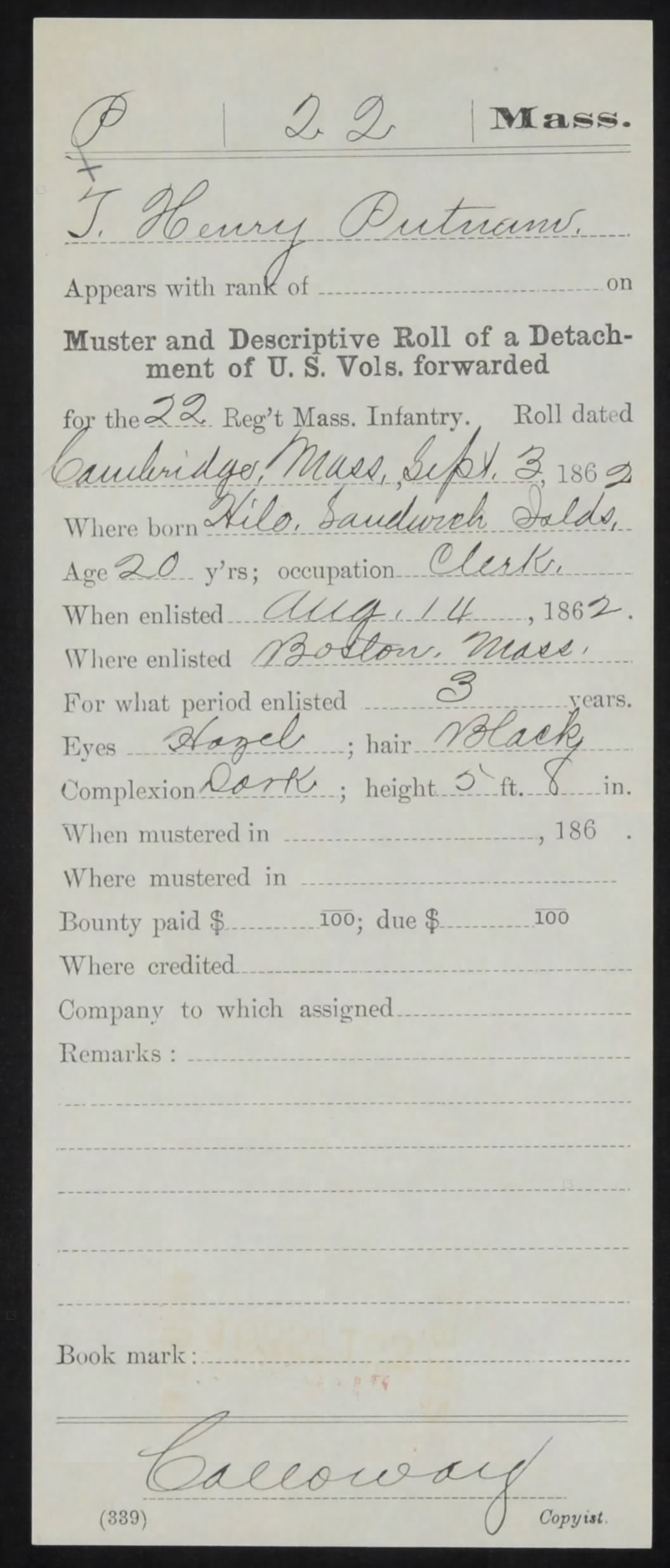
Enlistment card for Henry Pitman

On August 14, 1862, Pitman left school without his family's knowledge and volunteered to serve in the Union Army and fight in the Civil War. He apparently never informed his family in advance about the choice to join the war, because the news of his enlistment was reported back in Hawaiʻi's American missionary community as "Henry Pitman has run away from home and gone [to war]." Carter described Pitman's rationale for enlisting: "In the midst of the clamor of war, when the very air vibrated with excitement, the wild enthusiasm of the crowds, and the inspiring sound of the drum, his Indian nature rose within him. His resolve was made."

Pitman was a hapa-haole, of part Hawaiian and part Caucasian descent. (Note: Specifically, he was 3/8 Hawaiian and 5/8 Caucasian.) His father was white and his native-born mother was also part Caucasian from her own mother, who was the daughter of Captain Cox and a Hawaiian chiefess. Despite his mixed-race ancestry, Pitman avoided the racial segregation imposed on other Native Hawaiian volunteers in this period. Most Native Hawaiians who participated in the war were assigned to colored regiments, but Pitman's fair skin color meant he was able to serve in a white unit, indicating that unit assignment may have been influenced by how dark Hawaiians appeared. (Note: During the war, Samuel C. Armstrong, the son of an American missionary in Maui who also enlisted, met two Native Hawaiians named Kealoha and Kaiwi, who were privates in the 41st Regiment United States Colored Troops and 28th Regiment United States Colored Troops, respectively.) Historians Bob Dye, James L. Haley and others claimed Pitman was placed in the colored regiments because of his mixed race, but regiment records indicate otherwise.

Pitman served as a private in the 22nd Regiment Massachusetts Volunteer Infantry, Company H. This regiment was also named the "Henry Wilson's Regiment" after Colonel and U.S. Senator Henry Wilson, who commanded the unit in 1861. Colonel William S. Tilton was the regimental commander during Pitman's brief term of service. The regiment was part of the V Corps of the Army of the Potomac under the senior command of Major General George B. McClellan. During this period, the regiment fought in the Second Battle of Bull Run and was involved in the Maryland Campaign fighting in the Battle of Antietam, the bloodiest single-day battle in American history, and the Battle of Shepherdstown. (Note: The inscription on his tombstone also stated he fought at the Battle of South Mountain.) His regiment was on the march to the Battle of Fredericksburg when Pitman was captured by Confederate troops.

=== Imprisonment and death ===
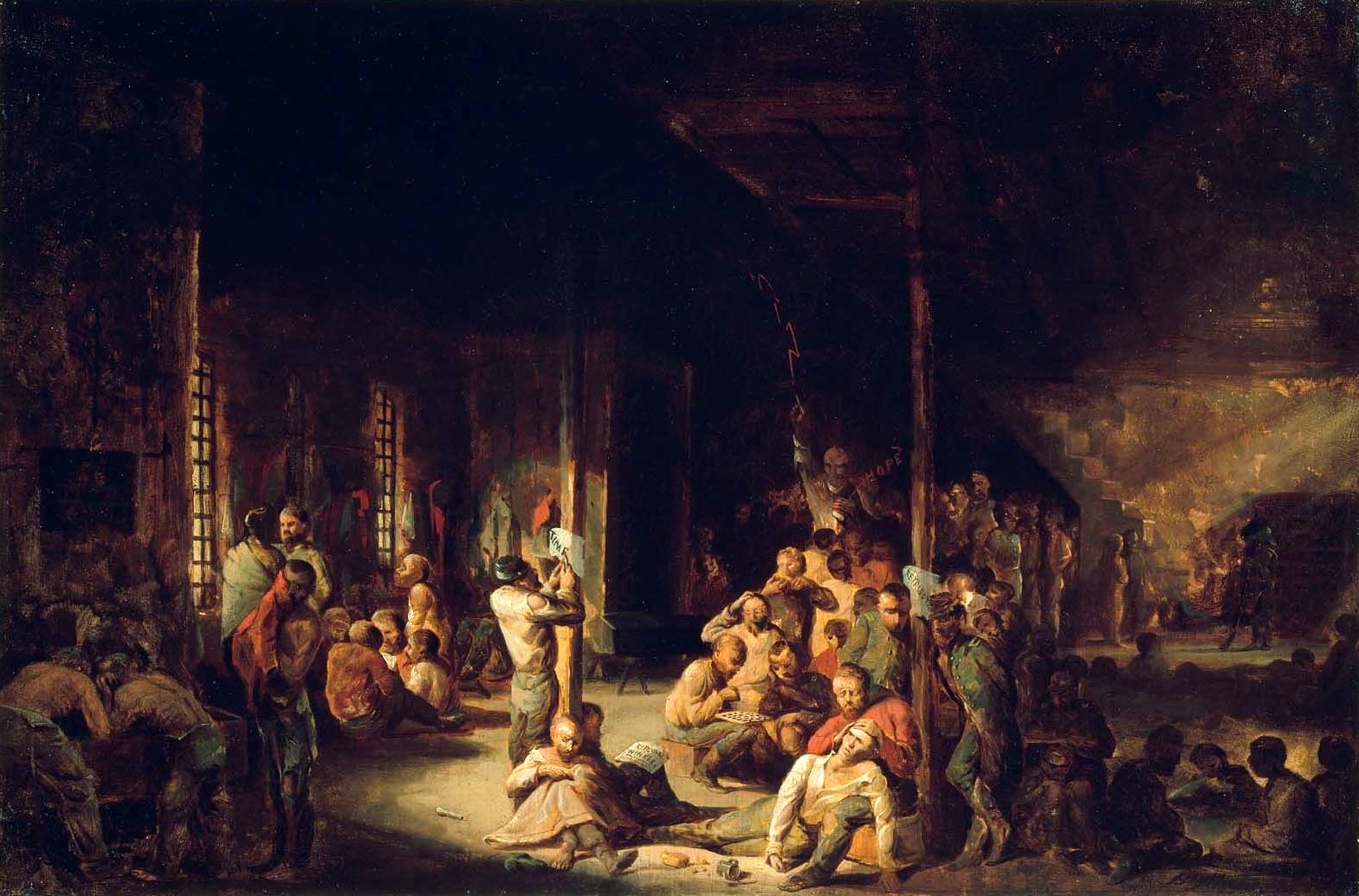
Depiction of the harsh conditions of Libby Prison by David Gilmour Blythe, 1863

The most detailed account of Pitman's final fate in the war came from Robert G. Carter. In November 1862, Pitman was captured near Warrenton Junction on the march toward Fredericksburg, Virginia, during the weeks prior to the Battle of Fredericksburg. He had fallen behind the group because his feet had blistered and swollen due to the tightness of "a pair of thin, high-heeled and narrow soled boots" he had purchased. One of his comrades temporarily stayed behind to care for him but later decided to move on with the rest of the camp for fear of disciplinary consequences of falling out without authority. He was urged to move on, but without much success. Pitman's last words to his comrade were, "I will be in camp by night, good by." His fellow soldiers never saw him again and considered him missing. Shortly after he was left, a band of Confederate guerrillas under Colonel John S. Mosby captured the weary and defenseless soldier without a struggle. The inscription on his tombstone differs slightly from Carter's account, stating he was captured by J. E. B. Stuart's cavalry instead.

After Pitman's capture, he was marched to Richmond in a weak physical state. He was imprisoned in the Confederate Libby Prison and Belle Isle, which were notoriously harsh prisons. Pitman's letters home described his place of incarceration as the "Pen" (Note: The newspaper Hawaiian Gazette speculated in 1910 that the "Pen" referred to Andersonville Prison.) where "the filthy meat [was] thrown to them as if they were dogs". The condition of his incarceration including the shortage of food, lack of sanitation, overcrowding and his physical weakness made him susceptible to virulent diseases present in the Confederate prisons. Carter described how the prisons "wore out the brave spirit". During a prisoner exchange, Pitman was released by the Confederate Army at City Point, Virginia, on December 12, 1862, and then sent to Camp Parole, Annapolis. Suffering from complications due to the conditions of his imprisonment, he contracted "lung fever", which was perhaps pneumonia. Carter wrote later how his friend had "linger[ed] feebly a few weeks, like the flickering of an expiring flame, then quietly pass[ed] away to an eternal life". Pitman died at Camp Parole on February 27, 1863, just weeks short of his eighteenth birthday. According to historians Anita Manning and Justin Vance, Pitman "has the unfortunate distinction of being the only known Hawaiian or Pacific Islander to die as a prisoner of war in the Civil War".

Considering him missing, Pitman's regiment did not discover his final fate until news of his funeral at Roxbury was received in the spring of the following year. His remains were returned to his family in Massachusetts after his death in Camp Parole. Benjamin Pitman, his father, had him buried in a family plot in Mount Auburn Cemetery. On one side of the Pitman family grave marker was placed the inscription:

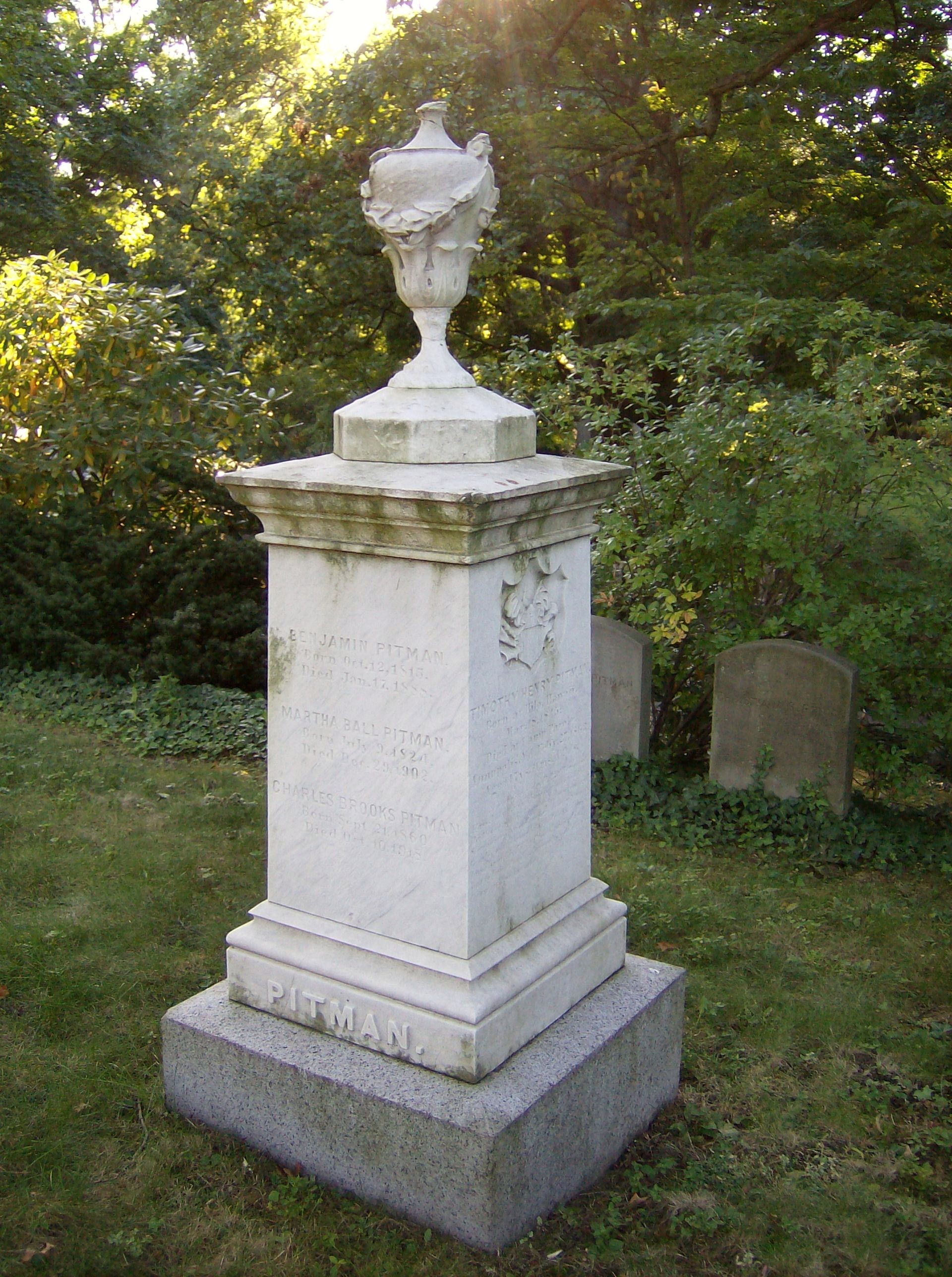
The Pitman family marker at Mount Auburn Cemetery

Timothy Henry Pitman
Born at Hilo, Hawaii
Mar. 18, 1845
Died at Camp Parole
Annapolis, MD, Feb'y 27, 1863
Aged 17 years 11 mos. 9 days

A member of Co. H, 22nd Regiment
Mass. Vols., was with his Regiment in the
battles of South Mountain, Antietam and
Sharpsburg. Was taken prisoner by Stuart's
cavalry on the march to Fredricksburg [sic];
Imprisoned in Libby Prison, paroled and
sent to Camp Parole, Annapolis, and died in
camp of pneumonia.

== Legacy ==
After his death, the memory of Henry Hoʻolulu Pitman was honored by friends and family members back in Massachusetts and Hawaiʻi. During a return to Hawaiʻi in 1917, his younger brother Benjamin Keolaokalani Pitman and his wife Almira Hollander Pitman discovered a grandson of a nephew was named Kealiʻi i Kaua i Pakoma (meaning "Chief that fought the Potomac") in honor of his deceased older brother. Sons of two of Pitman’s Hawaiian Beckley first cousins later served during World War I: Henry Hoʻolulu Pitman Beckley, his namesake, served as an American Red Cross captain of medical supply trains in Siberia, while George Healii Kahea Beckley served in the British Army.

Shortly after his death, Pitman was eulogized back in Hawaiʻi by Martha Ann Chamberlain, Corresponding Secretary of the Hawaiian Mission Children's Society: (Note: The three older Pitman children and their half-sister Maria Kinoʻole were lifetime members of the Hawaiian Mission Children's Society since their stepmother Maria Louisa Walsworth Kinney was part of the Twelfth Company of missionaries from the American Board of Commissioners for Foreign Missions to arrive in 1848.)

Our cousin, Henry Pitman, the first of Hawaii's sons to fall in the war, died at Annapolis Parole Camp, Feb. 27, of lung fever, serving as a soldier in the Union army. His remains were deposited in Mt. Auburn Cemetery, near Boston, Mass. He died in a just cause. Let his memory be embalmed among our band.

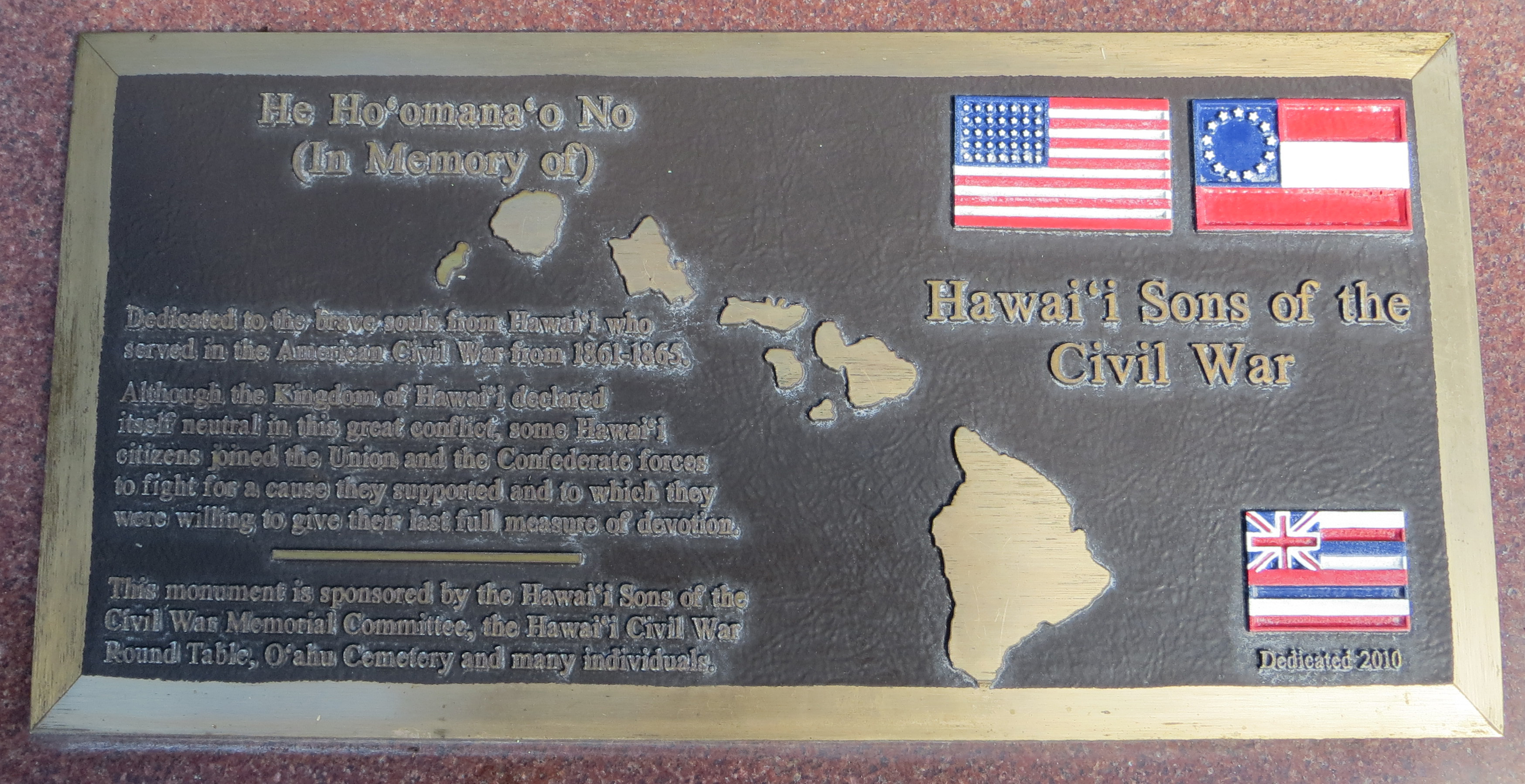
Memorial plaque for Hawai‘i Sons of the Civil War in the National Memorial Cemetery of the Pacific, Honolulu

After the war, the military service of Hawaiians, including Henry Hoʻolulu Pitman, were largely forgotten, disappearing from the collective memories of the American Civil War and the history of Hawaiʻi. However, in recent years, Hawaiian residents and historians and descendants of Hawaiian combatants in the conflict have insisted on the need to remember "our boys from Hawaii". Renewed interest in the stories of these individuals and this particular period of Hawaiian-American history have inspired efforts to preserve the memories of the Hawaiians who served in the war. On August 26, 2010, on the anniversary of the signing of the Hawaiian Neutrality Proclamation, a bronze plaque was erected along the memorial pathway at the National Memorial Cemetery of the Pacific in Honolulu recognizing these "Hawaiʻi Sons of the Civil War", the more than one hundred documented Hawaiians (Note: As of 2014, researchers have identified 119 documented Native Hawaiian and Hawaii-born combatants from historical records. The exact number still remains unclear because many Hawaiians enlisted and served under Anglicized names and little is known about them due to the lack of detailed records.) who served during the American Civil War for both the Union and the Confederacy. Pitman's great-grandniece Diane Kinoʻole o Liliha Pitman Spieler attended the ceremony. Pitman Spieler stated, "I'm very proud of a young man of his age – he was quite young – who served in the Civil War for his family."

The title character Dr. Peter Blood of Rafael Sabatini's Captain Blood trilogy (1922–1936) and resulting film adaptations is credited as being based on Pitman, imagining an alternate history in which he became a pirate, in place of Henry Morgan, inspired by the work of Alexandre Exquemelin.

In 2013, Todd Ocvirk, Nanette Napoleon, Justin Vance, Anita Manning and others began the process of creating a historical documentary film about the individual experiences and stories of Hawaii-born soldiers and sailors of the Civil War, including Pitman, Samuel C. Armstrong, Nathaniel Bright Emerson, James Wood Bush, J. R. Kealoha and many other unnamed combatants of both the Union and the Confederacy. In 2014, Maui-based author Wayne Moniz wrote a fictionalized story based on the lives and Civil War service of Hawaiian soldiers like Henry Hoʻolulu Pitman in his book Pukoko: A Hawaiian in the American Civil War. In 2015, the sesquicentennial of the end of the war, the National Park Service released a publication titled Asians and Pacific Islanders and the Civil War about the service of the large number of combatants of Asian and Pacific Islander descent who fought during the war. The history of Hawaiʻi's involvement and the biographies of Pitman, Bush, Kealoha and others were co-written by historians Anita Manning and Justin Vance.

== See also ==
- Hawaii and the American Civil War
- Massachusetts in the American Civil War

== Bibliography ==
=== Books and journals ===
- Carter, Robert Goldthwaite (1897). "Four Brothers in Blue". The Maine Bugle. Vol. 4. Rockland, ME: Maine Association. OCLC 6767472.
- Carter, Robert Goldthwaite (1913). Four Brothers in Blue, Or, Sunshine and Shadows of the War of the Rebellion: A Story of the Great Civil War from Bull Run to Appomattox. Washington, D.C.: Press of Gibson Bros., Inc. OCLC 3527819. Archived from the original on March 22, 2016.
- Cox, Christopher (2013). History of Massachusetts Civil War Regiments: Artillery, Cavalry, and Infantry. Raleigh, NC: Lulu Publishing. ISBN 978-1-304-46992-2. OCLC 897834743.
- Cracroft, Sophia; Franklin, Jane; Queen Emma (1958). Korn, Alfons L. (ed.). The Victorian Visitors: An Account of the Hawaiian Kingdom, 1861–1866, Including the Journal Letters of Sophia Cracroft: Extracts from the Journals of Lady Franklin, and Diaries and Letters of Queen Emma of Hawaii. Honolulu: University of Hawaii Press. hdl:10125/39981. ISBN 978-0-87022-421-8. OCLC 8989368.
- Daughters of the American Revolution (1910). Lineage Book, Volume 30. Washington, D.C.: The Society. OCLC 1565972.
- Daughters of the American Revolution (1938). Lineage Book, Volume 163. Washington, D.C.: The Society. OCLC 1565972.
- Daws, Gavan (1968). Shoal of Time: A History of the Hawaiian Islands. Honolulu: University of Hawaii Press. ISBN 978-0-8248-0324-7. OCLC 45815755.
- Dye, Bob (1997). Merchant Prince of the Sandalwood Mountains: Afong and the Chinese in Hawaiʻi. Honolulu: University of Hawaii Press. ISBN 978-0-8248-1772-5. OCLC 247424976. Archived from the original on February 24, 2019.
- Forbes, David W., ed. (2001). Hawaiian National Bibliography, 1780–1900, Volume 3: 1851–1880. Vol. 3. Honolulu: University of Hawaii Press. ISBN 978-0-8248-2503-4. OCLC 123279964. Archived from the original on December 24, 2019.
- Grzyb, Frank L. (2016). The Last Civil War Veterans: The Lives of the Final Survivors, State by State. Jefferson, NC: McFarland & Company, Inc., Publishers. ISBN 978-1-4766-2488-4. OCLC 934885367.
- Haley, James L. (2014). Captive Paradise: A History of Hawaii. New York: St. Martin's Press. ISBN 978-1-4668-5550-2. OCLC 886879619. Archived from the original on July 29, 2016.
- Hawaiian Mission Children's Society (1863). Eleventh Annual Report of the Hawaiian Mission Children's Society. Vol. 11. Honolulu: Hawaiian Mission Children's Society. OCLC 7859883.
- Hawaiian Mission Children's Society (1901). Portraits of American Protestant Missionaries to Hawaii. Honolulu: The Hawaiian Gazette Co. OCLC 11796269. Archived from the original on March 26, 2016.
- Kai, Peggy (1974). "Chinese Settlers in the Village of Hilo Before 1852". The Hawaiian Journal of History. 8. Honolulu: Hawaiian Historical Society: 39–75. hdl:10524/221. OCLC 60626541.
- Kanahele, George S. (1999). Emma: Hawaii's Remarkable Queen. Honolulu: University of Hawaii Press. ISBN 978-0-8248-2240-8. OCLC 40890919. Archived from the original on May 8, 2016.
- Kuykendall, Ralph Simpson (1965) [1938]. The Hawaiian Kingdom 1778–1854, Foundation and Transformation. Vol. 1. Honolulu: University of Hawaii Press. ISBN 0-87022-431-X. OCLC 47008868. Archived from the original on September 25, 2014.
- Kuykendall, Ralph Simpson (1953). The Hawaiian Kingdom 1854–1874, Twenty Critical Years. Vol. 2. Honolulu: University of Hawaii Press. ISBN 978-0-87022-432-4. OCLC 47010821. Archived from the original on December 13, 2014.
- Manning, Anita; Vance, Justin W. (2014). "Hawaiʻi at Home During the American Civil War". The Hawaiian Journal of History. 47. Honolulu: Hawaiian Historical Society: 145–170. hdl:10524/47259. OCLC 60626541.
- Massachusetts. Office of the Secretary of the Commonwealth (1904). Massachusetts Soldiers and Sailors of the Revolutionary War. Boston: Wright and Potter Printing Co., State Printers. OCLC 1139232.
- Massachusetts. Adjutant General's Office (1931). Massachusetts Soldiers, Sailors, and Marines in the Civil War. Vol. II. Norwood, MA: Printed at the Norwood Press. OCLC 11485612. Archived from the original on September 25, 2016.
- Maxwell, James Robert (1926). Autobiography of James Robert Maxwell of Tuskaloosa, Alabama. New York City: Greenberg.
- McKinzie, Edith Kawelohea (1983). Stagner, Ishmael W. (ed.). Hawaiian Genealogies: Extracted from Hawaiian Language Newspapers. Vol. 1. Honolulu: University of Hawaii Press. ISBN 0-939154-28-5. OCLC 12555087. Archived from the original on October 22, 2016.
- Merry, Sally Engle (2000). Colonizing Hawaiʻi: The Cultural Power of Law. Princeton: Princeton University Press. ISBN 0-691-00932-5. OCLC 231845368. Archived from the original on April 23, 2017.
- O'Connor, Kaori (1997). "Thomas Spencer and "a Visit to Kīlauea"". The Hawaiian Journal of History. 31. Honolulu: Hawaiian Historical Society: 208–213. hdl:10524/367. OCLC 60626541.
- Okihiro, Gary (2015). American History Unbound: Asians and Pacific Islanders. Oakland: University of California Press. ISBN 978-0-520-96030-5. OCLC 914255697.
- Oswald, Olaf (August 1932). "Whither Hawaii?". Paradise of the Pacific. Vol. 45, no. 8. Honolulu: Press Publishing Co. pp. 5–8, 20–22. OCLC 6372692.
- Parker, John Lord; Carter, Robert Goldthwaite (1887). Henry Wilson's Regiment. History of the Twenty-Second Massachusetts Infantry, the Second Company Sharpshooters, and the Third Light Battery, in the War of the Rebellion. Boston: Regimental Association, Press of Rand Avery Co. OCLC 472159622. Archived from the original on December 17, 2015.
- Pierce, John (April 1956). "The Passing of a Favorite Hilo Landmark". Paradise of the Pacific. Vol. 68, no. 4. Honolulu: Press Publishing Co. pp. 20–30. OCLC 6372692.
- Pitman, Almira Hollander (1931). After Fifty Years: An Appreciation, and a Record of a Unique Incident. Norwood, MA: Priv. print., The Plimpton Press. OCLC 3703871. Archived from the original on November 28, 2016.
- Pukui, Mary Kawena; Elbert, Samuel H.; Mookini, Esther T. (1974). Place Names of Hawaii. Honolulu: University of Hawaii Press. ISBN 978-0-8248-0524-1. OCLC 1042464. Archived from the original on November 1, 2019.
- Schmitt, Robert C. (1998). "Hawaiʻi's War Veterans and Battle Deaths". The Hawaiian Journal of History. 32. Honolulu: Hawaiian Historical Society: 171–174. hdl:10524/521. OCLC 60626541.
- Schuessler, Mark (January 2012). "A Surprising Civil War Dedication". American Digger. 8 (1). Acworth, GA: Greybird Publishing: 66. OCLC 56026232.
- Shively, Carol A., ed. (2015). "Pacific Islanders and the Civil War". Asians and Pacific Islanders and the Civil War. Washington, D. C.: National Park Service. pp. 130–163. ISBN 978-1-59091-167-9. OCLC 904731668.
  - Vance, Justin; Manning, Anita. Introduction. In Shively (2015), pp. 132–135.
  - ——; ——. "Henry Hoolulu (Timothy) Pitman". In Shively (2015), pp. 146–149.
  - ——; ——. "The Impact of the Civil War on the Kingdom of Hawaii". In Shively (2015), pp. 161–163.
- Vance, Justin W.; Manning, Anita (October 2012). "The Effects of the American Civil War on Hawaiʻi and the Pacific World". World History Connected. 9 (3). Champaign, IL: University of Illinois. Archived from the original on August 26, 2015.
- Walworth, Clarence Augustus (1897). Walworths of America: Comprising Five Chapters of Family History, with Additional Chapters of Genealogy. Albany, NY: Weed-Parsons Printing Co. ISBN 9785879428889. OCLC 10910899.

=== Newspapers and online sources ===
- "Ancient Hawaiian Lineage in Bostonian Coming Today". Honolulu Star-Bulletin. Vol. XXIV, no. 7737. Honolulu: Oahu Publications, Inc. January 30, 1917. p. 10. Archived from the original on November 23, 2015.
- Armstrong, Samuel C. (April 1, 1865). "Extract of a Letter from Col. Armstrong". The Friend. Vol. 22, no. 4. Honolulu: Samuel C. Damon. p. 30. Archived from the original on December 8, 2015.
- Cole, William (May 31, 2010). "Native Hawaiians served on both sides during Civil War". Honolulu Star-Advertiser. Honolulu: Oahu Publications, Inc. Archived from the original on February 17, 2016.
- "Cousins Department". The Friend. Vol. LXXV, no. 8. Honolulu. August 1, 1917. p. 181. Archived from the original on June 10, 2016.
- Damon, Ethel M. (April 1, 1941). "Punahou Volunteers of 1863". The Friend. Vol. CXI, no. 4. Honolulu. p. 67. Archived from the original on June 4, 2016.
- Davis, Chelsea (October 26, 2014). "Hawaiian Civil War soldier finally recognized". Hawaii News Now. Archived from the original on August 22, 2015.
- "Death". The Pacific Commercial Advertiser. Vol. VII, no. 48. Honolulu: H. M. Whitney. May 28, 1863. p. 3. Archived from the original on October 5, 2015.
- "Death – Pitman". Evening Saturday Gazette. Vol. XLIX, no. 11. Boston: William W. Clapp, Jr. March 14, 1863. p. 3.
- "Death of an Old Kamaaina". Hilo Tribune. Vol. 10, no. 16. Hilo, HI: Hilo Tribune Publishing Company. February 14, 1905. p. 1. Archived from the original on November 7, 2015.
- "Died in Libby Prison, in Quarrel that Wasn't His'n – Interesting Photograph Recalling the Part Hawaiians Played in the Civil War". The Hawaiian Gazette. Vol. LIII, no. 51. Honolulu: J. H. Black at the Government Printing Office. June 28, 1910. p. 3. Archived from the original on November 7, 2015.
- Dye, Bob (July 3, 1994). "'We are all Unionists out here' – There was no Civil War neutrality in Hawaii". The Honolulu Advertiser. Honolulu. p. 5. Archived from the original on July 26, 2018 – via Newspapers.com.
- Hawaiʻi Pacific University (July 15, 2015). "HPU partners with National Park Service, Hawaii Civil War Round Table for July 17 talk". HPU News. Archived from the original on July 20, 2015.
- Kapiikauinamoku (June 21, 1956). "Peleuli II Brought Up In Kamehamehaʻs Court – The Story of Maui Royalty". The Honolulu Advertiser. Honolulu. p. 18. Archived from the original on July 26, 2018 – via Newspapers.com.
- Meharg, Daniel (April 12, 2024). "How a native Hawaiian found a purpose in life in Siberia Russia: Part One". LinkedIn.
- Montano, Mary Jane Fayerweather (December 25, 1923). "Quaint Recollections Of Hawaiian Royalty In Picturesque Year". The Honolulu Advertiser. Honolulu. pp. 12–13. Archived from the original on July 25, 2018 – via Newspapers.com.
- "Mookuauhau Alii – Na Iwikuamoo o Hawaii Nei Mai Kahiko Mai" (PDF). Ka Makaainana. Vol. VI, no. 5. Honolulu. August 3, 1896. p. 2. Archived (PDF) from the original on March 4, 2016.
- "Mr. and Mrs. Benjamin F. Pitman "At Home"". Honolulu Star-Bulletin. Vol. XXIV, no. 7753. Honolulu: Oahu Publications, Inc. February 17, 1917. p. 9. Archived from the original on November 27, 2015.
- Murray, Anthony (July 2, 2013). "Sons Of The Civil War". Midweek Kauai. Honolulu: Oahu Publications, Inc. Archived from the original on October 17, 2015.
- "Na Mea Hou O Hawaii Nei – Keiki Kupa". Ka Nupepa Kuokoa. Vol. II, no. 22. Honolulu. May 30, 1863. p. 2. Archived from the original on November 17, 2015.
- Ocvirk, Todd (July 31, 2013). "Hawaii Sons of the Civil War – A Documentary Film". Indiegogo. Archived from the original on July 11, 2013.
- Pignataro, Anthony (March 18, 2015). "Talking story with author Wayne Moniz about Hawaii's hidden Civil War history". MauiTime. Wailuku: MauiTime Productions. Archived from the original on August 18, 2015.
- Punaboy (June 20, 2015). "Hawaiʻi Sons of the Civil War". Aloha Valley. Archived from the original on July 17, 2015.
- Von Buol, Peter (October–November 2016). "On Foreign Fields". Hana Hou!. Vol. 19, no. 5. Honolulu. Archived from the original on February 1, 2020.
- Smith, Jeffrey Allen (August 13, 2013). "The Civil War and Hawaii". The New York Times: Opinionator. New York. Archived from the original on July 26, 2018.
- "Returning Home After Fifty Years". Honolulu Star-Bulletin. Vol. XXIV, no. 7707. Honolulu: Oahu Publications, Inc. December 26, 1916. p. 9. Archived from the original on November 19, 2015.
- Sodetani, Naomi (February 2013). "Sons of the Civil War". Ka Wai Ola. Vol. 30, no. 2. Honolulu: Office of Hawaiian Affairs. p. 15. Archived from the original on March 22, 2016.
- Tanaka, Chris (September 20, 2013). "Hawaii's little known role in the Civil War". Hawaii News Now. Honolulu. Archived from the original on September 24, 2015.
- Wood, Ben (March 17, 2007). "Museum given manuscript of early Hilo businessman". Honolulu Star-Bulletin. Vol. 12, no. 76. Honolulu: Oahu Publications, Inc. Archived from the original on September 7, 2015.
