= Mary Pitman Ailau =

Hawaiian noblewoman

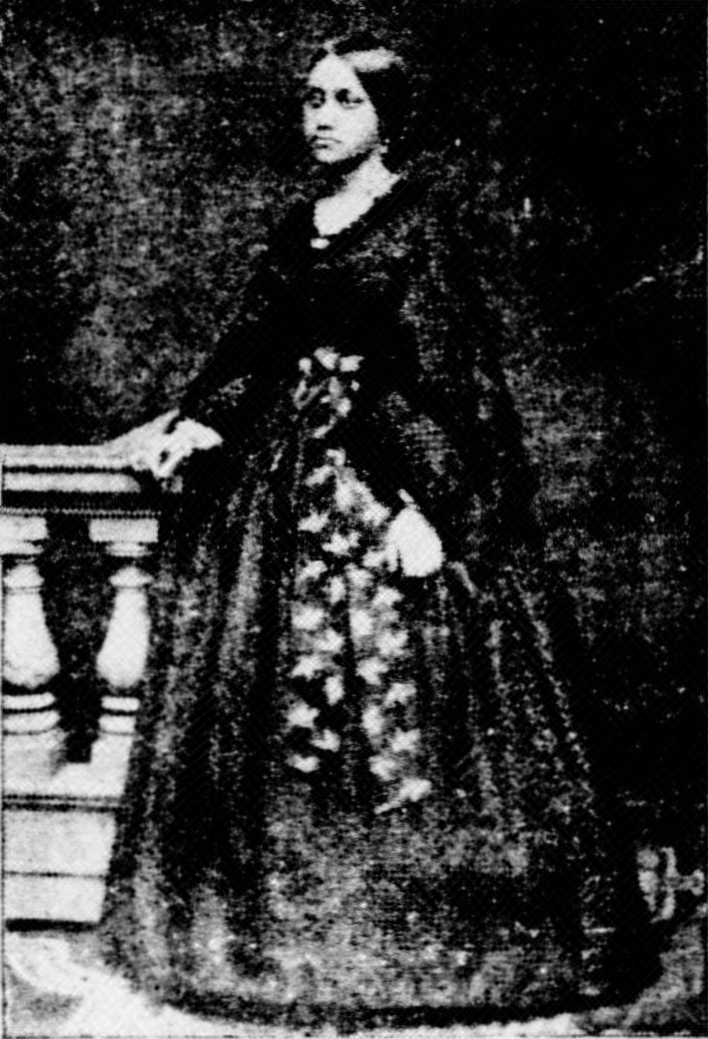
- Born: 1838/March 1841; Hilo, Hawaiʻi, Kingdom of Hawaiʻi
- Died: February 11, 1905(aged 64); Hilo, Hawaiʻi, Territory of Hawaiʻi
- Burial: February 12, 1905; Homelani Cemetery, Hilo
- Spouse: John Keakaokalani Ailau
Names
- Mary Ann Kinoʻole Kaʻaumokulani Pitman Ailau
- Father: Benjamin Pitman
- Mother: Kinoʻoleoliliha

Mary Ann Kinoʻole Kaʻaumokulani Pitman (1838/March 1841 – February 11, 1905), later Mary Pitman Ailau, was a high chiefess of the Kingdom of Hawaiʻi of part Native Hawaiian and American descent. She was raised and educated in Hilo and Honolulu and served as a maid of honor and lady-in-waiting of Queen Emma, the wife of Kamehameha IV. In 1861, she left for the United States with her family, and she lived for the next twenty years in New England. She visited her distant cousin King Kalākaua during his state visit to the United States in 1875. She returned in 1881 to Hawaiʻi where she married musician John Keakaokalani Ailau, better known as Jack Ailau. In later life, she invested in Hawaiian curio shops selling artifacts of Hawaiiana; many of her collections are preserved in the Bernice Pauahi Bishop Museum.

== Early life and family ==
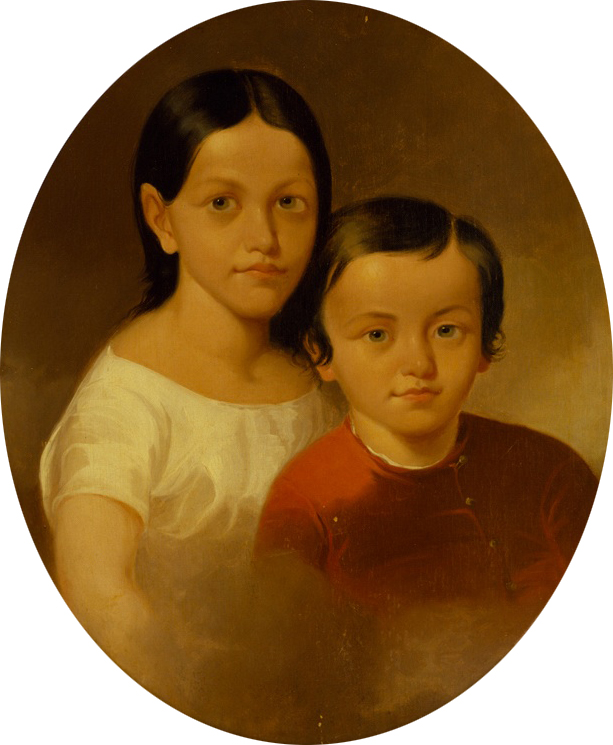
Portrait of Pitman and her brother Henry by John Mix Stanley (1849)

Born in Hilo, on the island of Hawaiʻi, Pitman was the eldest child and only daughter of Benjamin Pitman and Kinoʻoleoliliha, a high chiefess of Hilo. She has been said to have been born either in 1838 or March 1841. In the Hawaiian language, her name Kinoʻole means "thin" or "without body."

Her father, a native of Salem, Massachusetts, was an early pioneer, businessman and sugar- and coffee-plantation owner on the island of Hawaiʻi who profited greatly from the kingdom's booming whaling industry in the early 1800s. Her mother was a descendant of Kameʻeiamoku, one of the royal twins (with Kamanawa) who advised Kamehameha I in his conquest of the Hawaiian Islands, and also of the early American or English sea captain Harold Cox, who lent his name to George "Cox" Kahekili Keʻeaumoku II, the Governor of Maui. Her maternal grandfather Hoʻolulu, along with his brother Hoapili, helped conceal the bones of King Kamehameha I in a secret hiding place after his death. Her siblings were Henry Hoʻolulu Pitman (1845–1863), Benjamin Franklin Keolaokalani Pitman (1852–1918), half-sister Maria Kinoʻole Pitman Morey (1858–1892) and half-brothers Charles Brooks Pitman (1860–1918) and Harold Albert Pitman (1865–1948).

Because of her father's success in business and her mother's descent from Hawaiian royalty, the family was considered quite prosperous and were host to the royal family when they visited Hilo. Besides being one of the leading merchants in town, her father also served the government as district magistrate of Hilo. Kinoʻole had inherited control over much of the lands in Hilo and Ōlaʻa from her own father, and King Kamehameha III had granted her use of the ahupuaʻa (traditional land division) of Hilo after her marriage. During Mary Pitman's early childhood, the family lived in the mansion that Benjamin Pitman had built in 1840 in an area known as Niopola, one of the favored resort spots of ancient Hawaiian royalty. The residence became known as the Spencer House after Benjamin Pitman sold it to his business partner Captain Thomas Spencer. (Note: During a trip to Hawaiʻi in 1917, Almira Hollander Pitman, his sister-in-law, wrote "The hotel in Hilo is the old home of the Pitmans, and Dad [Benjamin Keolaokalani Pitman] remembered it all. Of course, the old garden is nearly gone, and houses are built on the grounds, but many of the old trees are still growing.") In the 1850s the family moved to Honolulu, where Benjamin Pitman took up banking and built a two-story house that he named Waialeale ("rippling water") at the corner of Alakea and Beretania Streets.

== Education and role in royal court ==
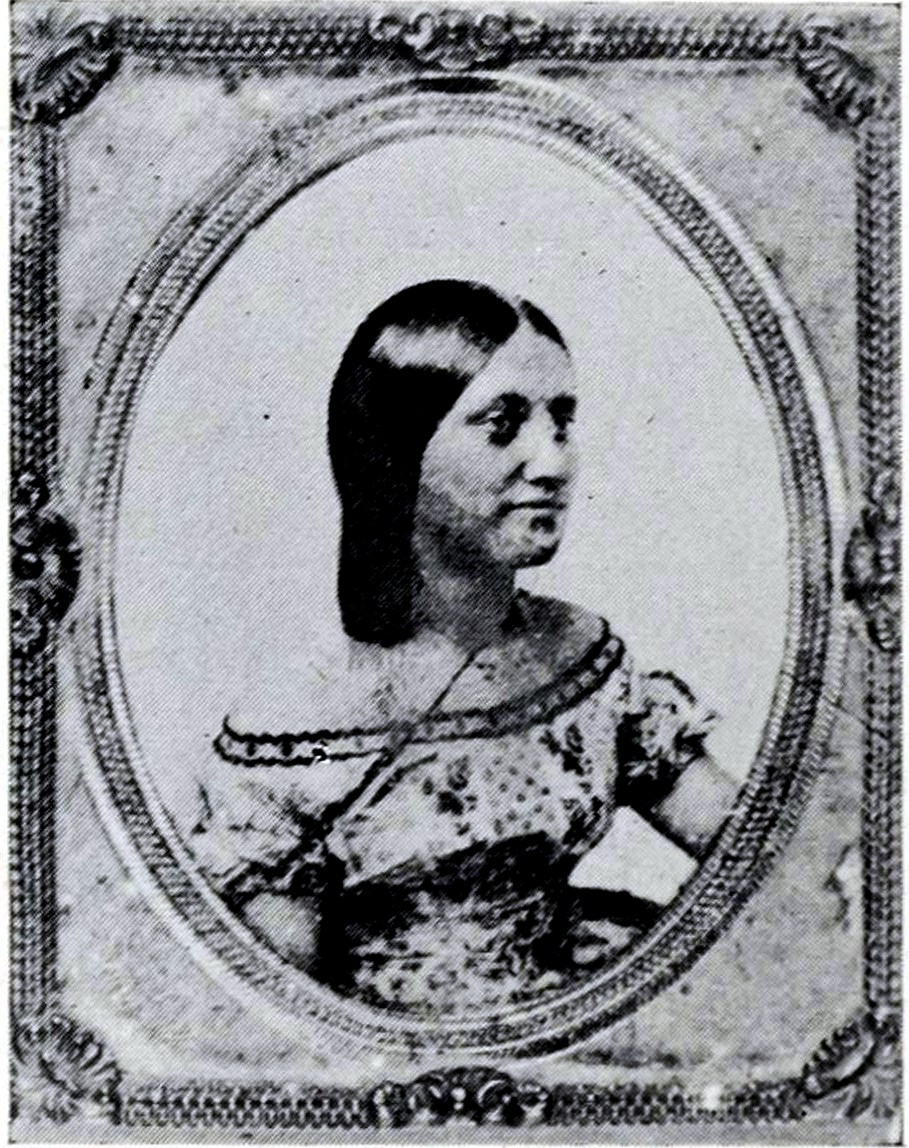
Pitman around 1856, when she was a maid of honor to Queen Emma

While in Hawaiʻi, Pitman and her brother Henry attended the children's school in Hilo run by Lucy Sheldon Taylor Wetmore, the wife of American missionary doctor and government physician Charles Hinckley Wetmore. The school was located at the Wetmores' residence on Church Street. Taught by Wetmore, who had come to Hawaiʻi in 1848 with the American Board of Commissioners for Foreign Missions (ABCFM) and started the school in April 1850, the two elder Pitman children received their education in English rather than Hawaiian. At the time all of the other schools in Hilo were conducted in Hawaiian.

Wetmore taught the children reading, writing, spelling, arithmetic and singing, while also reinforcing the curriculum with a strong adherence to the principles of the Protestant faith. Like the Pitman siblings, many of their classmates were of half-Hawaiian (hapa-kanaka) descent, with a majority of them being Chinese-Hawaiians (hapa-pake). She was also educated in private schools in Honolulu.

In her youth, Pitman was known as the "Belle of Hilo Bay." She became an intimate friend of Emma Rooke, who became Kamehameha IV's queen. Alongside Princess Victoria Kamāmalu and Lydia Kamakaʻeha Pākī (the future Queen Liliʻuokalani), she served as a maid of honor in the royal wedding of Kamehameha IV and Queen Emma on June 19, 1856. She also served as one of the ladies-in-waiting of the queen in the young court of the royal couple. Writing in 1910, historian Albert Pierce Taylor, who married Pitman's relative Emma Ahuena Taylor, said, "Miss Pittman [sic] was considered a very beautiful girl, her complexion being marvelously clear."

== Massachusetts ==
After the death of Pitman's mother, Kinoʻole, in 1855, her father married Maria Louisa Walsworth Kinney, the widow of American missionary Rev. Henry Kinney. The Kinneys were part of the Twelfth Company of missionaries from the ABCFM to arrive in 1848. The marriage aligned the Pitman children with the American missionary community; they were called "cousins" by the children of the missionaries and considered part of the extended missionary family of Hawaiʻi. Kinney died in 1858 after giving birth to their father's fourth child, a daughter named Maria Kinoʻole (1858–1892). The family moved from Hawaii to Massachusetts in 1861 after her father married his third wife, Martha Ball Paddock. They traveled to the United States with British traveler Sophia Cracroft and her aunt, Lady Jane Franklin, who was searching around the world for her husband's lost expedition. According to a letter by Cracroft, the Pitmans left for San Francisco on June 25, 1861, aboard the ship Comet with Cracroft and Franklin and the elder Pitman "now has a third wife with a baby [Charles Brook Pitman]." Cracroft wrote that Mary Pitman "is very dark—i.e. her Hawaiian descent is perfectly evident, though she has much of the American character in feature."

The family lived in the Massachusetts towns of Roxbury and Somerville. Her siblings continued their education in their new home and Pitman finished hers in a Boston-area school. Henry Pitman fought for the Union Army in the American Civil War from 1862 to 1863 and died after being released from Libby Prison. The Pitmans also lived in Germany for a period of time. The 1865 Massachusetts State Census listed her in the household of her father, estimating her age to be 21 and describing her race as "White".

By 1875, Pitman was living in New Bedford while her father and his third wife were in Europe. She was noted for her swimming abilities, which attracted much attention when she visited sea bathing spots on the New England coast. During the state visit of King Kalākaua to the United States, she called on the king when he arrived in New Bedford on January 1, 1875. She was escorted by the king at an afternoon dinner reception at the Parker House, which was attended by 60 guests. The following day, she paid a morning visit to the king at his hotel in Boston, where she had breakfast with Kalākaua. The Boston Daily Globe wrote of her: "Miss Mary Pitman of New Bedford, who is of the blood royal, and who claims as good a right to the Hawaiian throne as the reigning monarch." She and Kalākaua were distant cousins, both descending from Kameʻeiamoku.

== Return to Hawaiʻi ==
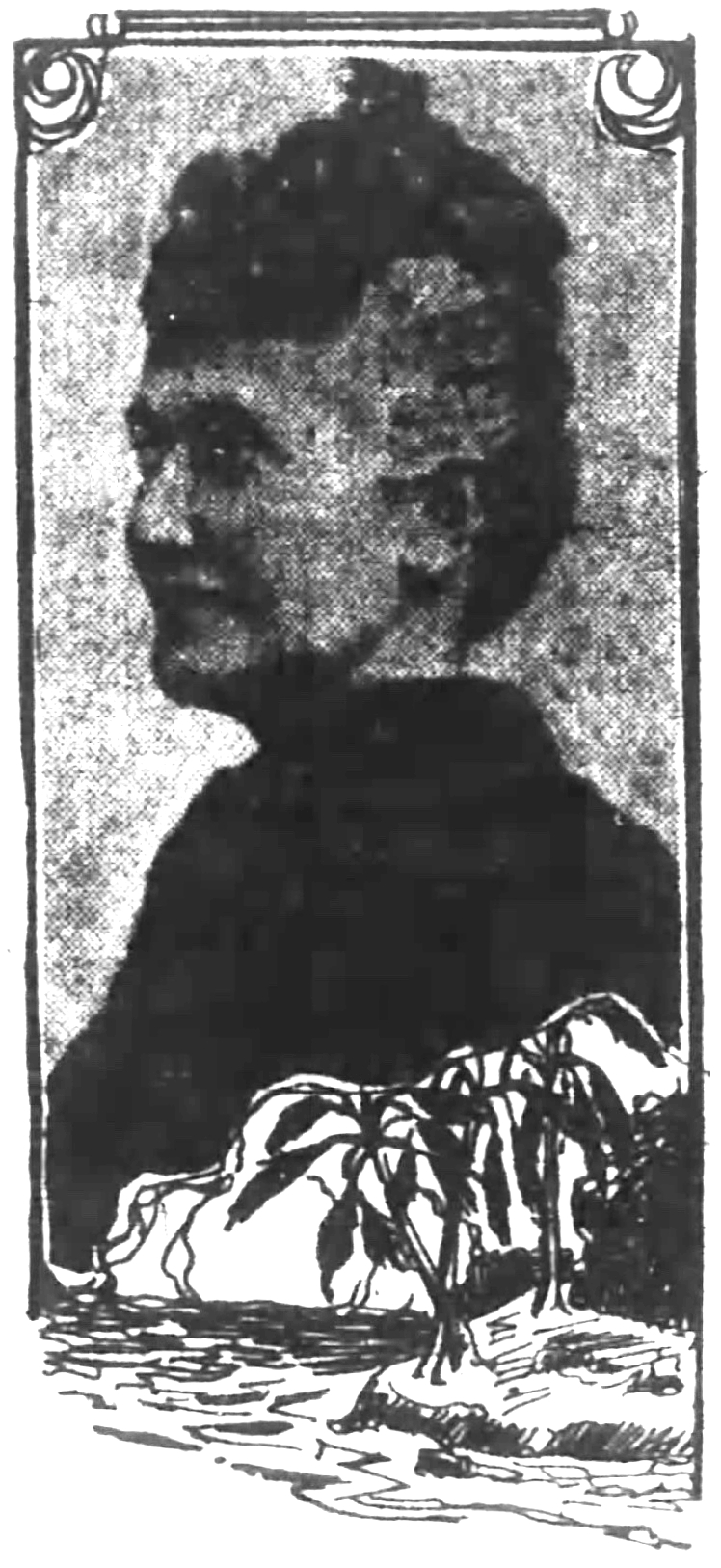
Pitman in later life

Pitman returned to live in Hawaiʻi in 1881. She married John Keakaokalani Ailau (1855–1894) around 1883. Better known as Jack Ailau, her husband was a newspaper printer, musician and member of the Hawaiian Quintet Club. They had no children although she had an adopted daughter. He died of heart disease on January 17, 1894, while they were visiting San Francisco during the California Midwinter International Exposition of 1894.

For the 1883 coronation of Kalākaua and Queen Kapiʻolani, Pitman and Princess Poʻomaikelani, the queen's sister, helped fashion ʻahuʻula (feather cloaks) and kāhili (feather standards) for the ceremony. The two women used goose and duck feathers dyed in the colors of the extinct or endangered native birds originally used to fabricate the cloaks. Many of these pieces are now preserved in the Kalanianaʻole Collection at the Bernice Pauahi Bishop Museum.

From her marriage to her final illness, Pitman collected and sold goods and artifacts of Hawaiiana in curio stores in Honolulu and Hilo. At Hilo, she partnered with the "Victor girls" in a curio shop located on Pitman Street near the Hilo Hotel. Many of her wares and artifacts are now in the Bishop Museum.

Pitman died from an attack of apoplexy, on February 11, 1905, at the home of Cecelia Neilson Arnold, the mother of future Honolulu mayor Charles N. Arnold. She had suffered a stroke two years before from which she had never fully recovered. Two weeks before her death, she became ill with influenza, and she suffered a second stroke on the left side of her body a week before her death. Her funeral was held the following afternoon at the Arnold residence and she was buried at the Homelani Cemetery in Hilo. A memorial service was held at St. Andrew's Cathedral in Honolulu on February 24, 1905.

In 1917, her younger brother Benjamin Keolaokalani Pitman and his wife Almira Hollander Pitman returned to Hawaiʻi for a visit. The Hawaiian press covered the visit heavily as well as the history of the family. The Honolulu Star-Bulletin wrote that Pitman "was acknowledged to be one of the brightest women Hawaii has produced."

== Bibliography ==
Books and journals

- Cracroft, Sophia; Franklin, Jane; Queen Emma (1958). Korn, Alfons L. (ed.). The Victorian Visitors: An Account of the Hawaiian Kingdom, 1861–1866, Including the Journal Letters of Sophia Cracroft: Extracts from the Journals of Lady Franklin, and Diaries and Letters of Queen Emma of Hawaii. Honolulu: University of Hawaii Press. hdl:10125/39981. ISBN 978-0-87022-421-8. OCLC 8989368.
- Haley, James L. (2014). Captive Paradise: A History of Hawaii. New York: St. Martin's Press. ISBN 978-1-4668-5550-2. OCLC 886879619.
- Hawaiian Mission Children's Society (1863). Eleventh Annual Report of the Hawaiian Mission Children's Society. Vol. 11. Honolulu: Hawaiian Mission Children's Society. OCLC 7859883.
- Hawaiian Mission Children's Society (1901). Portraits of American Protestant Missionaries to Hawaii. Honolulu: The Hawaiian Gazette Co. OCLC 11796269.
- Kai, Peggy (1974). "Chinese Settlers in the Village of Hilo Before 1852". The Hawaiian Journal of History. 8. Honolulu: Hawaiian Historical Society: 39–75. hdl:10524/221. OCLC 60626541.
- Kanahele, George S. (1999). Emma: Hawaii's Remarkable Queen. Honolulu: University of Hawaii Press. ISBN 978-0-8248-2240-8. OCLC 40890919.
- Kuykendall, Ralph Simpson (1965) [1938]. The Hawaiian Kingdom 1778–1854, Foundation and Transformation. Vol. 1. Honolulu: University of Hawaii Press. ISBN 0-87022-431-X. OCLC 47008868.
- Kuykendall, Ralph Simpson (1953). The Hawaiian Kingdom 1854–1874, Twenty Critical Years. Vol. 2. Honolulu: University of Hawaii Press. ISBN 978-0-87022-432-4. OCLC 47010821.
- Liliuokalani (1898). Hawaii's Story by Hawaii's Queen, Liliuokalani. Boston: Lee and Shepard. ISBN 978-0-548-22265-2. OCLC 2387226.
- Manning, Anita; Vance, Justin W. (2014). "Hawaiʻi at Home During the American Civil War". The Hawaiian Journal of History. 47. Honolulu: Hawaiian Historical Society: 145–170. hdl:10524/47259. OCLC 60626541.
- McKinzie, Edith Kawelohea (1983). Stagner, Ishmael W. (ed.). Hawaiian Genealogies: Extracted from Hawaiian Language Newspapers. Vol. 1. Honolulu: University of Hawaii Press. ISBN 0-939154-28-5. OCLC 12555087.
- Merry, Sally Engle (2000). Colonizing Hawaiʻi: The Cultural Power of Law. Princeton: Princeton University Press. ISBN 0-691-00932-5. OCLC 231845368.
- Peterson, Barbara Bennett, ed. (1984). Notable Women of Hawaii. Honolulu: University of Hawaii Press. ISBN 978-0-8248-0820-4. OCLC 11030010.
- Pitman, Almira Hollander (1931). After Fifty Years: An Appreciation, and a Record of a Unique Incident. Norwood, MA: Priv. print., The Plimpton Press. OCLC 3703871.
- Pukui, Mary Kawena; Elbert, Samuel H. (1986). Hawaiian Dictionary: Hawaiian-English, English-Hawaiian. Honolulu: University of Hawaii Press. ISBN 978-0-8248-0703-0. OCLC 12751521.
- Pukui, Mary Kawena; Elbert, Samuel H.; Mookini, Esther T. (1974). Place Names of Hawaii. Honolulu: University of Hawaii Press. ISBN 978-0-8248-0524-1. OCLC 1042464.
- Shively, Carol A., ed. (2015). "Pacific Islanders and the Civil War". Asians and Pacific Islanders and the Civil War. Washington, D. C.: National Park Service. pp. 130–163. ISBN 978-1-59091-167-9. OCLC 904731668.
  - Vance, Justin; Manning, Anita. "Henry Hoolulu (Timothy) Pitman". In Shively (2015), pp. 146–149.
- Summers, Catherine C. (1999). Material Culture: The J. S. Emerson Collection of Hawaiian Artifacts. Honolulu: Bishop Museum Press. ISBN 978-1-58178-006-2. OCLC 260032891.
- Taylor, Albert Pierce (1922). Under Hawaiian Skies: A Narrative of the Romance, Adventure and History of the Hawaiian Islands. Honolulu: Advertiser Publishing Company, Ltd. OCLC 479709.
- Walworth, Clarence Augustus (1897). Walworths of America: Comprising Five Chapters of Family History, with Additional Chapters of Genealogy. Albany, NY: Weed-Parsons Printing Co. ISBN 9785879428889. OCLC 10910899.

Newspapers and online sources

- "Ancient Hawaiian Lineage in Bostonian Coming Today". Honolulu Star-Bulletin. Vol. XXIV, no. 7737. Honolulu: Oahu Publications, Inc. January 30, 1917. p. 10.
- "At New Bedford". The Boston Daily Globe. Boston. January 2, 1875. p. 1.
- "Death of an Old Kamaaina". Hilo Tribune. Vol. 10, no. 16. Hilo, HI: Hilo Tribune Publishing Company. February 14, 1905. p. 1.
- "Death of John Ailau". Evening Bulletin. Honolulu. January 27, 1894. p. 3.
- "DIED". The Hawaiian Star. Honolulu. February 14, 1905. p. 7.
- "Died Of Heart Disease - Death of John Ailau, a Hawaiian Musician". San Francisco Chronicle. San Francisco. January 18, 1894. p. 7.
- "Editorial Notes". The Junction City Weekly Union. Junction City, Kansas. January 30, 1875. p. 1.
- "Had Blood Of Hawaiian Chiefs – Death of Mrs. Mary Pitman Ailau of High Rank Who Was One of Queen Emma's Maids". San Francisco Chronicle. San Francisco. March 1, 1905. p. 4.
- Kapiikauinamoku (June 21, 1956). "Peleuli II Brought Up In Kamehamehaʻs Court – The Story of Maui Royalty". The Honolulu Advertiser. Honolulu. p. 18 – via Newspapers.com.
- "Local Brevities". The Pacific Commercial Advertiser. Honolulu. February 23, 1905. p. 9.
- "Mookuauhau Alii – Na Iwikuamoo o Hawaii Nei Mai Kahiko Mai" (PDF). Ka Makaainana. Vol. VI, no. 5. Honolulu. August 3, 1896. p. 2.
- "Mr. and Mrs. Benjamin F. Pitman "At Home"". Honolulu Star-Bulletin. Vol. XXIV, no. 7753. Honolulu: Oahu Publications, Inc. February 17, 1917. p. 9.
- "Mrs. M. A. K. K. P. Ailau". Paradise of the Pacific. Vol. XVIII, no. 2. Honolulu: Press Publishing Co. February 1905. p. 10. OCLC 6372692.
- "Mrs. Mary Ailau Passes Away On Island of Hawaii". The Pacific Commercial Advertiser. Honolulu. February 14, 1905. p. 2.
- "Of Hawaiian Ancestry". The Scranton Republican. Scranton, PA. March 18, 1905. p. 6.
- "Personals". The Pacific Commercial Advertiser. Honolulu. September 9, 1913. p. 6.
- "The Reception Dinner". Boston Post. Boston. January 2, 1875. p. 3.
- "Returning Home After Fifty Years". Honolulu Star-Bulletin. Vol. XXIV, no. 7707. Honolulu: Oahu Publications, Inc. December 26, 1916. p. 9.
- "Saturday's Proceedings". The Boston Daily Globe. Boston. January 4, 1875. p. 8.
- "Society". Honolulu Star-Bulletin. Vol. XXIV, no. 7738. Honolulu: Oahu Publications, Inc. January 31, 1917. p. 5.
- "Sudden Death of Benjamin Pitman". The Boston Daily Globe. Boston. January 18, 1888. p. 1.
- Taylor, Albert Pierce (June 12, 1910). "Court Beauties of Fifty Years Ago". The Pacific Commercial Advertiser. Vol. VII, no. 388. Honolulu. p. 13. Archived from the original on January 9, 2017.
- Taylor, Emma Ahuena (February 23, 1935). "Kalakaua's Coronation Plans Were Subject For Wide Criticism". Honolulu Star-Bulletin. Honolulu. p. 5 – via Newspapers.com.
- Wood, Ben (March 17, 2007). "Museum given manuscript of early Hilo businessman". Honolulu Star-Bulletin. Vol. 12, no. 76. Honolulu: Oahu Publications, Inc.
