= Kinoʻoleoliliha =

High Chiefess of the Kingdom of Hawaiʻi (c. 1825–1855)

Kinoʻole-o-Liliha
- High Chiefess Kinoʻole
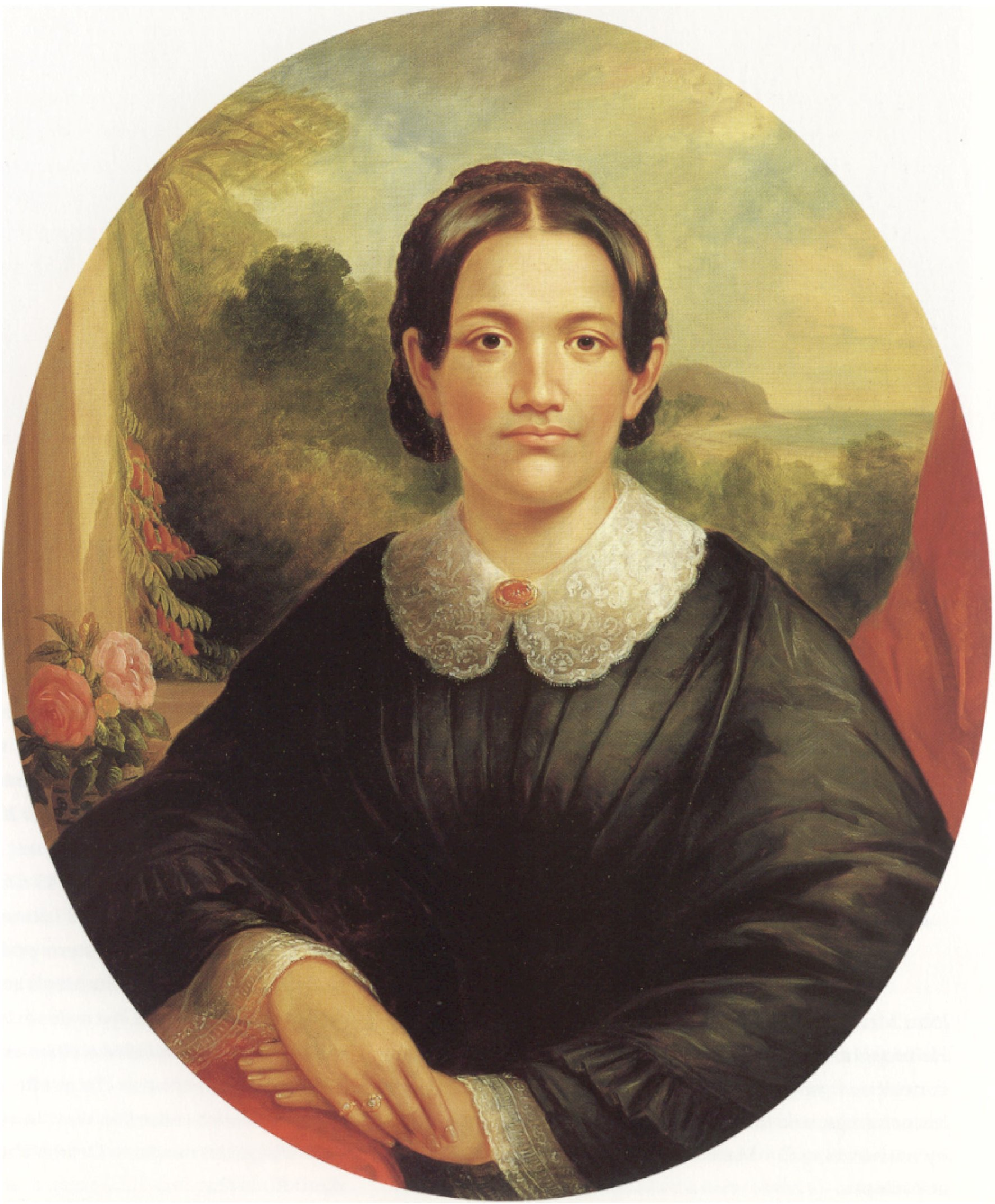
- Portrait by John Mix Stanley 1849 at the Peabody Essex Museum of Salem
- Born: c. 1825; Hilo, Hawaii, Kingdom of Hawaii
- Died: August 16, 1855 (aged 30); Honolulu, Oahu, Kingdom of Hawaii
- Spouse: Benjamin Pitman
- Issue: Mary Pitman Ailau; Henry Hoʻolulu Pitman; Benjamin Keolaokalani Pitman
- Father: High Chief Hoʻolulu
- Mother: High Chiefess Charlotte Halaki Cox

Kinoʻoleoliliha Pitman (c. 1825–1855), also written as Kinoole-o-Liliha, was a high chiefess in the Kingdom of Hawaii. She was known as Mrs. Pitman after her marriage. In the Hawaiian language, kino 'ole means "thin" and liliha can mean "heartsick".

== Life ==
Her father was High Chief Hoʻolulu. Her paternal grandfather was High Chief Kameʻeiamoku, one of the royal twins (with Kamanawa) who advised Kamehameha I, and her paternal grandmother was High Chiefess Kahikoloa. Her mother was High Chiefess Charlotte Halaki Cox, whose father lent his name to Keeaumoku II, the Governor of Maui. Her father and uncle Hoapili were chosen to conceal the bones of Kamehameha I in a secret hiding place after his death. They placed the bones of the king in a cave along the coastline; it was a great honor to be the last to touch the bones of the king. Her brothers were the High Chief Kaiheʻekai and the High Chief Moʻoheau-nui-i-Kaaiawaawa-o-ʻUlu and her only known sister was the High Chiefess Kahinu-o-kekuaukalani, who married William Beckley (1814–1871), the hapa-haole son of Captain George Charles Beckley (1787–1826), an English sea captain and close friend of Kamehameha I, and his Hawaiian wife, the Chiefess Ahia (1792–1854). Some of her famous cousins are: High Chief Kamanawa II and High Chief ʻAikanaka, sons of her uncle High Chief Kepoʻokalani and grandfathers of Queen Liliʻuokalani and King David Kalākaua; the High Chiefess Kapiʻolani, daughter of her aunt High Chiefess Kekikipaʻa; the High Chiefess Keouawahine, daughter of her aunt High Chiefess Loewahine and grandmother of Princess Ruth Keʻelikōlani; and Kuini Liliha, the daughter of her uncle the High Chief Hoapili.

From her father she inherited vast lands in Hilo and Olaʻa. King Kamehameha III granted her control of the ahupuaʻa of Hilo, thereby making her high chiefess. It was customary that when the lehuas started to bloom, the first blossoms had to be strung into the leis for Kinoʻole. These flowers were called the "Lehuas of Panaewa". This is one of the remnant traces of the kapu system which gave the noble class special privileges and sacredness.

She married Benjamin Pitman, born in Salem, Massachusetts who had arrived in Hawaii from New England in 1833. Pitman was a prominent businessman in Hilo and Honolulu. He owned a store or ship chandlery in Hilo and in Honolulu took up banking. This marriage was an example of a businessman marrying a landholding high chiefess. Such marriages paved the way for the ranches, plantations, banks and other businesses, through the investment of foreign capital.

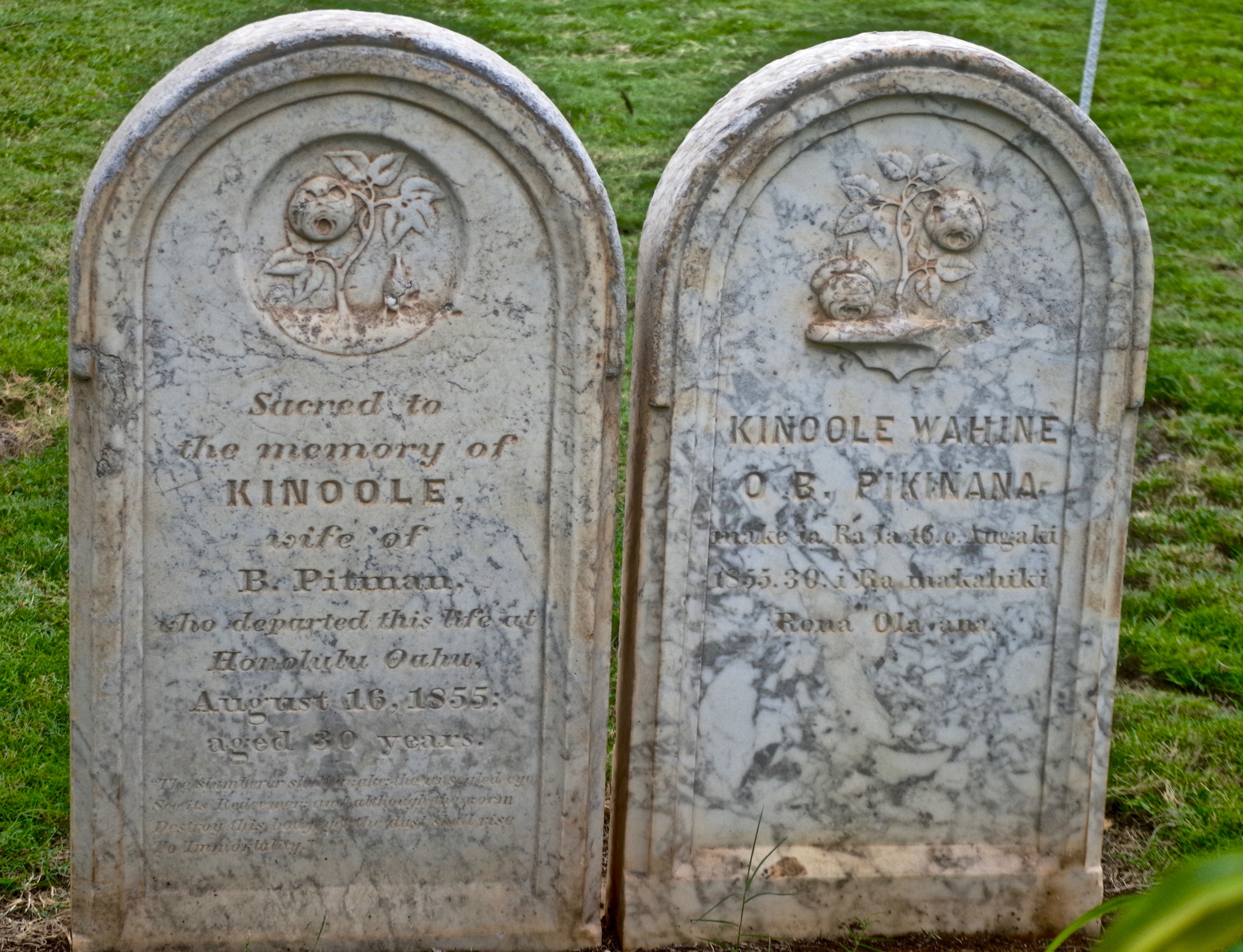
Gravestone at Waiola Church, Lahaina

In the 1850s, the Pitman family moved to the new capital of Honolulu. They built a beautiful two-story house named Waialeale ("rippling water") at the corner of Alakea and Beretania Streets, which later became the site of the Honolulu Gas Company office. Surrounded by an iron fence, the walks were paved with tiles. She died in Honolulu, on August 16, 1855, soon after the construction of her new home. She was buried at the Waiola Church, on Maui, where her headstone now stands. However, later reports claimed she was buried on the Island of Hawaii, her ancestral home, and her remains were taken to Hilo with a large entourage of relatives and friends. The people of Hilo, reportedly, swam out in great numbers to the boat and bore the casket on their shoulders.

== Children ==
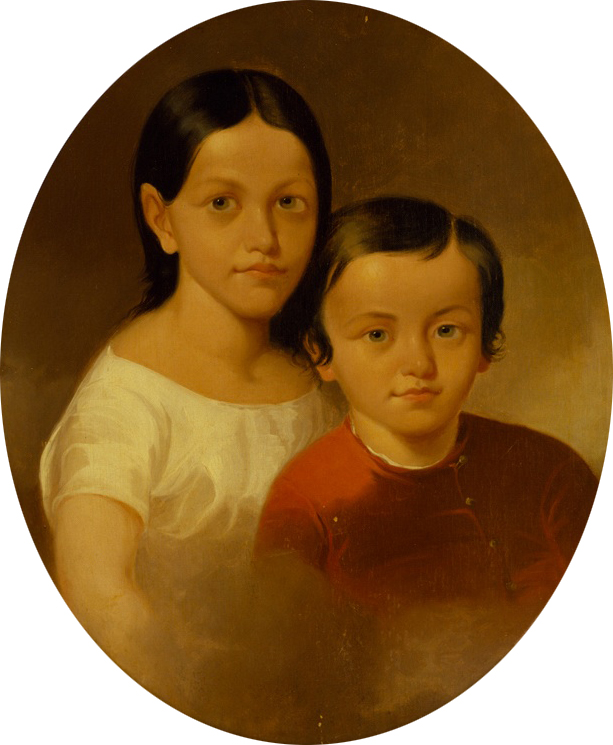
Portrait of Mary and Henry, painting by John Mix Stanley, 1849

Kinoʻole and Benjamin Pitman had three children:

1. Mary Ann Kinoʻole Kaʻaumokulani Pitman (1838/41–1905),, later Mary Ailau, an intimate friend and bridesmaid of Queen Emma, who married Kamehameha IV. In her youth, she was known as the "Belle of Hilo Bay". She married in late life to Jack Ailau (1860–1894), a printer and musician of Honolulu. She died childless at Hilo in 1905, ten years after her husband.
2. Henry Hoʻolulu Pitman (1845–1863), served in the American Civil War as a private in the Union Army, was taken prisoner and imprisoned at Libby Prison, and died after being released on parole in a prisoner exchange on February 27, 1863.
3. Benjamin Franklin Keolaokalani Pitman (1852–1918), married Almira Hollander (1854–1939), from Brookline, Massachusetts, His wife Almira was credited with helping the women of Hawaii achieve suffrage in 1918. Among their descendants is Theodore Pitman, great-great-grandson of Kinoʻole who donated some of his great-great-grandfather's manuscript that accounted the events of the early period of the Kingdom of Hawaii.

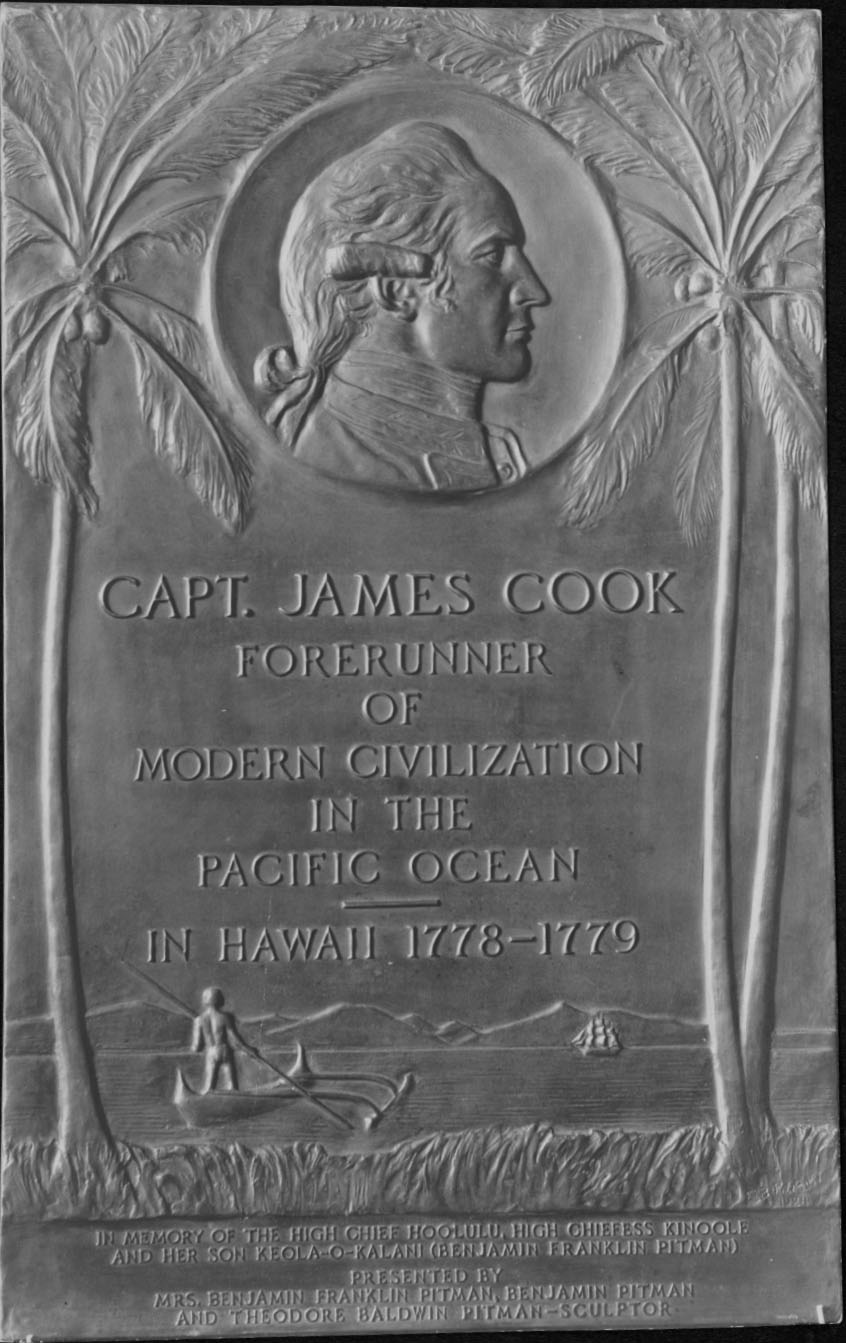
The Pitman Tablet was sculpted by her grandson Theodore Baldwin Pitman in honor of the sesquicentennial of Captain James Cook's arrival in Hawaii and the Pitman family of Hawaii

== Legacy ==
Pitman Street in Hilo was named for her husband, but later changed to Kinoʻole Street in her honor. The Kinoole Baptist Church, is located at coordinates 19°41′42″N 155°4′10″W.

In 1851, Benjamin Pitman bought the "Post Boy", a 44-ton topsail schooner built in Auckland, New Zealand that had arrived from San Francisco on November 22, 1850. It had been previously sold to a native by the name of Philip Nation who registered and ran her for a time under her foreign name. Pitman changed her name to the "Kinoole" after his wife. The "Kinoole" plied as a windward packet on various routes, with occasional trips to Kauaʻi. She was sold to R. Robinson and J. A. Simmons in 1852, Jas. Dawson and Paniani in 1853, D. Fredison and T.E. Cook and P.H. Treadway in 1856, A. K. Clark and O. H. Culick in 1858, and later to E. W. Clark and S. L. Austin. On February 1, 1859, the "Kinoole" sailed from Honolulu and landed on Kealakekua Bay two days later. Onboard was the President of Punahou School who wanted to see the recent eruption of Mauna Loa. On August 24, 1860, she finally wrecked on the shores of Niʻihau.

After her death on August 16, 1855, Pitman remarried to Maria Louisa Walsworth Kinney, but soon after, she too died. He relocated his three children to attend schools in Boston. Besides short trips back to Hawaii, her daughter Mary did not return to Hawaii until 1881. Their son Benjamin remained in Massachusetts where he married Almira Hollander Pitman; they visited Hawaii in 1917. Kinoʻole's descendants from her son Benjamin still live in Massachusetts. Many of her descendants were named after her.
