= Benjamin Pitman (Hawaii businessman) =

American businessman (1815–1888)

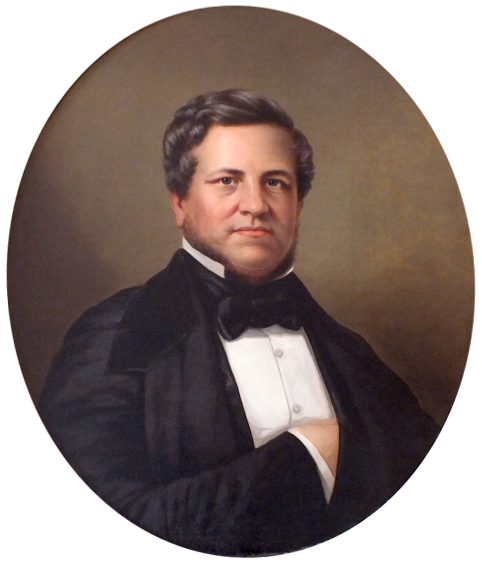
- Benjamin Pitman, c. 1864
- Born: October 12, 1815; Salem, Massachusetts, U.S.
- Died: January 17, 1888 (aged 72); Somerville, Massachusetts, U.S.
- Resting place: Mount Auburn Cemetery
- Occupation: Businessman
- Spouses: Kinoʻole o Liliha (m. 1834; died 1855) Maria Walsworth-Kinney (m. 1856; died 1858) Martha Ball Paddock (m. 1859)
- Children: 6 including, Mary and Henry

Benjamin Franklin Pitman (October 12, 1815 – January 17, 1888) was an American businessman who married Hawaiian nobility.

== Early life ==
Benjamin Franklin Pitman was born October 12, 1815, in Salem, Massachusetts. His father was Benjamin Cox Pitman (1790–1845) and mother was Sally Richardson (1789–1858). He had two sisters: Sally (died 1822) and Mary Elizabeth (died 1825).

Benjamin Cox Pitman came to the Hawaiian Islands on trading missions with Stephen Reynolds in 1826 and 1828. He brought his son in 1833 and settled in Hilo, Hawaii. On September 11, 1845, his father died and was buried in the new Oahu Cemetery.

Around 1846, he opened a small thatched hut with only a mat over a floor of bare earth at the rim of Kilauea volcano called Volcano House. He charged $1 a day, but eventually gave up the remote site. He opened a store in Hilo (called a ship chandler) to supply whaling ships. As the whaling business grew, so did his fortunes. He started added "Esq." at the end of his name and acted as district magistrate, but there is no record of his being educated in law. In 1849 a visitor described him as the major businessman in town.

By 1852, he was growing coffee, arrowroot, and sugarcane, and served as vice president of the Royal Hawaiian Agricultural Society. He employed Chinese laborers on his sugarcane plantation. Pitman served as customs collector and first postmaster on the island of Hawaii. In 1854, after the Hilo Boarding School and Church started by Sarah Joiner and David Belden Lyman burned down, he raised funds to rebuild it.

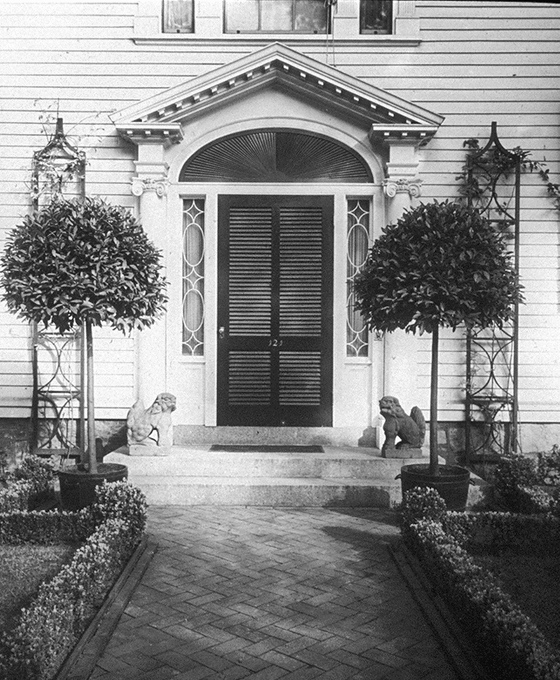
Pitman family house in Brookline, Massachusetts

When his business partner Reynolds died in 1859, Pitman became sole owner of the plantations, and built a house in Honolulu. About two years later, he sold his Hilo residence, which Pitman built at Niopola in 1840, and the sugarcane plantation at Amauulu (Puueo) to Thomas Spencer, and moved back to Boston so the children could attend school there. The Spencer House, as it became called, was later converted into the Hilo Hotel, which was torn down in 1956. In January 1868 he founded a "Hawaiian Club" in Boston. For a period in the 1870s, Pitman and his family lived in Germany.

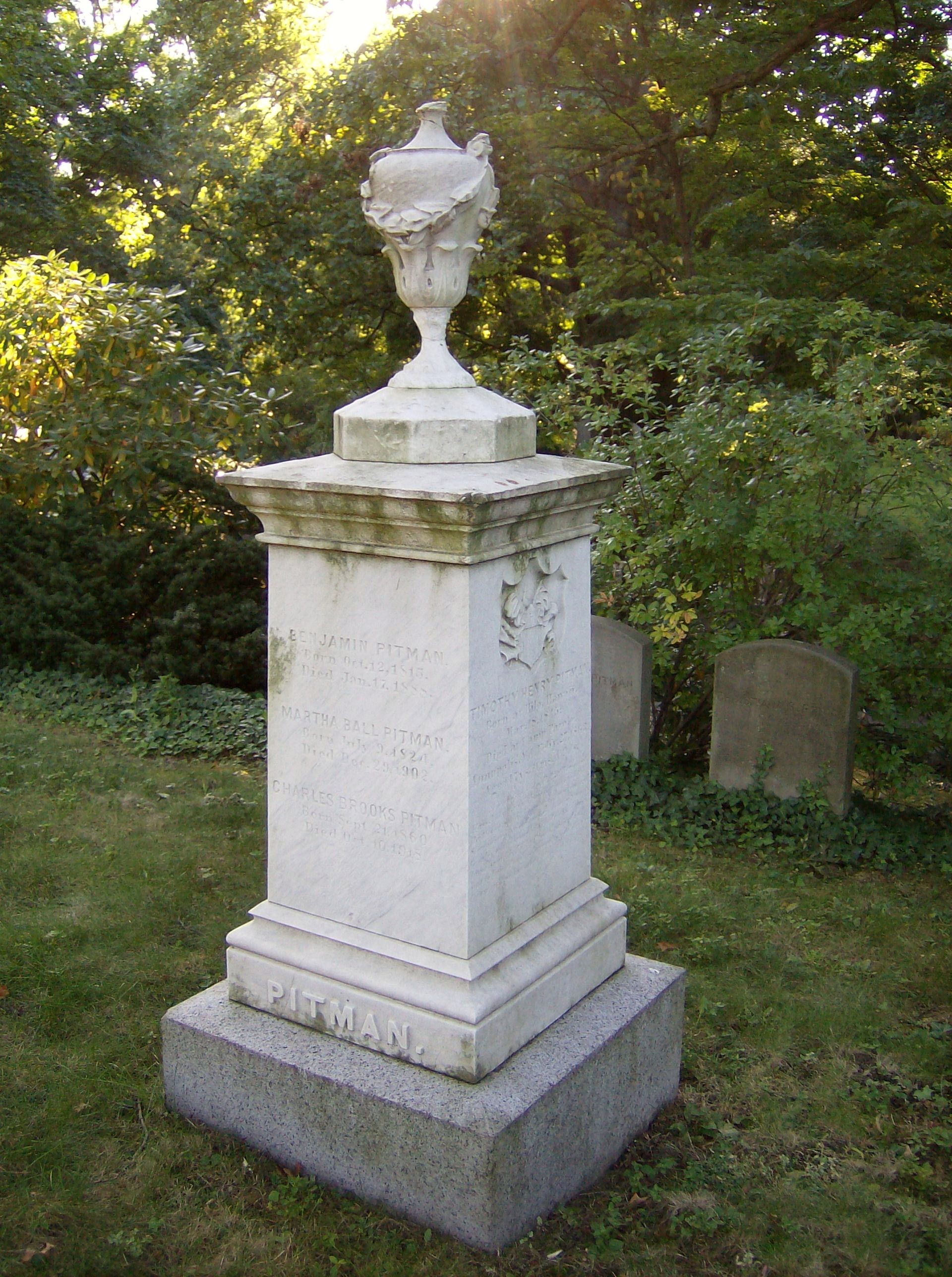
The Pitman family marker at Mount Auburn Cemetery

The family met future Queen Liliʻuokalani on her visit to Boston in 1887. His daughter Mary Pitman Ailau had been a bridesmaid with the Princess at Queen Emma of Hawaii's wedding.

== Personal life ==
In 1834, Pitman married Chiefess Kinoʻole o Liliha, who controlled vast lands under King Kamehameha III. His children with Kinoʻole were Mary Pitman Ailau (1838/41–1905), Henry Hoʻolulu Pitman (1845–1863), and Benjamin Franklin Keolaokalani Pitman (1852–1918). Kinoʻole died in 1855.

He married for a second time on August 5, 1856, on Oahu. Maria Louisa Walsworth was born in Cleveland, Ohio, May 20, 1822, married Rev. Henry Kinney, and had come in 1848 as missionary to the island. When Kinney's health failed, they traveled to California, where Kinney died in 1854. Walsworth moved back and married Pitman, but she died on March 6, 1858, in Hilo. Daughter Maria Kinoʻole Pitman (1858–1905) married Fred Morey of Chicago in 1881.

His third wife was Martha Ball Paddock (1824–1902), who he married on October 6, 1859 in Boston, with whom he had two sons: Charles Brooks Pitman (1860–1918) and Harold Albert Pitman (1865–1948).

== Death ==
Pitman died on January 17, 1888, at Somerville, Massachusetts. He was buried in a family plot in the Mount Auburn Cemetery.

Henry Hoʻolulu served in the American Civil War as a private in the 22nd Regiment Massachusetts Volunteer Infantry. He was captured, and died on February 27, 1863.

Benjamin F. K. Pitman married Almira Hollander (1854–1939) in 1875 and became a partner in his father-in-law's law firm, L. P. Hollander & Co. Almira became active in the movement for Women's suffrage in the United States, and the two returned to visit Hawaii in 1917. Their son Benjamin attended Harvard College, and their other son Theodore Pitman became a sculptor, dedicating a monument to his ancestors in 1928. Another Theodore, their great-grandson, donated a manuscript of notes from 1836 to 1861 to the Bishop Museum in 2007.
