= Robert G. Carter =

American Civil War–era cavalry officer (1845–1936)

Robert Goldthwaite Carter
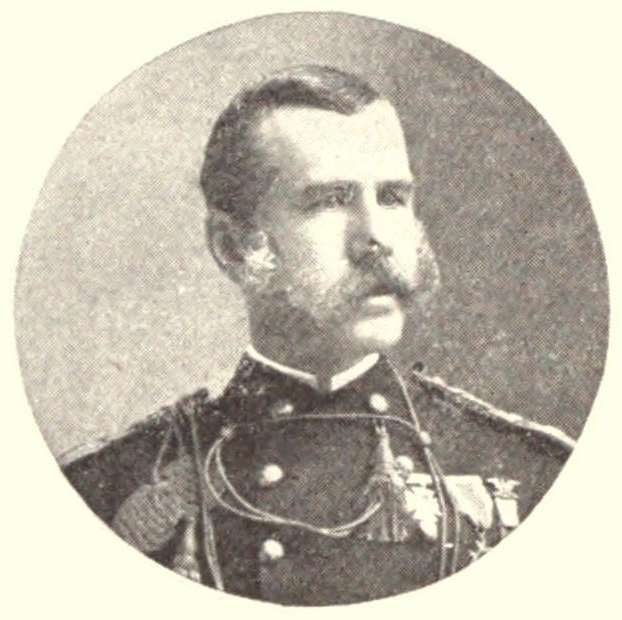
- Robert G. Carter
- Born: October 29, 1845; Bridgton, Maine, US
- Died: January 4, 1936 (aged 90); Washington, D.C., US
- Burial place: Arlington National Cemetery
- Military career
- Allegiance: United States of America; Union
- Branch: US Army; Union Army
- Service years: 1862–1864, 1870–1876
- Rank: Captain
- Unit: 4th Cavalry Regiment
- Conflicts: American Civil War; Indian Wars
- Awards: Medal of Honor

Robert Goldthwaite Carter (October 29, 1845 – January 4, 1936) was a US Cavalry officer who participated in the American Civil War and the Indian Wars, most notably against the Comanche during which he received the Medal of Honor for his role against a Comanche raiding party at Brazos River in Texas on October 10, 1871.

He became a successful author in his later years, writing several books based on his military career, including On the Border with Mackenzie (1935), as well as a series of booklets detailing his years as an Indian fighter on the Texas frontier. Only 100 of these were published for private distribution and are considered extremely rare, surviving only in selected excerpts included in On the Border with Mackenzie.

== Biography ==
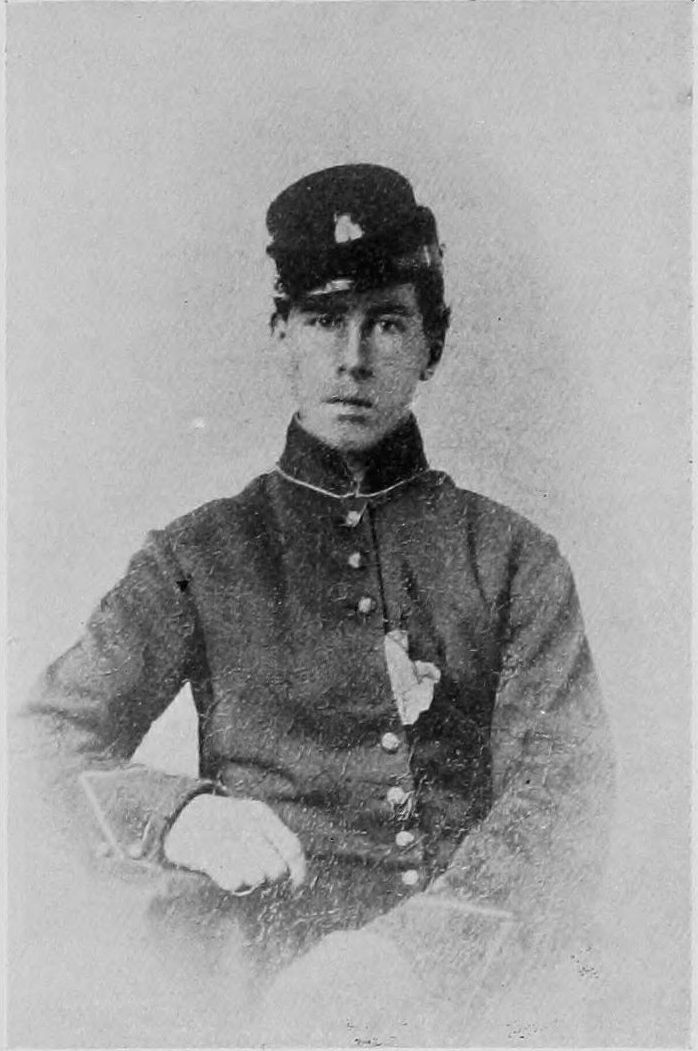
Robert G. Carter, in the Civil War

Born in Bridgton, Maine, Carter moved to Portland with his family in 1847, and again in 1857, to Massachusetts. He was preparing to enter Phillips Academy when Carter enlisted as a private in the 22nd Massachusetts Infantry at the start of the American Civil War and remained with the Army of the Potomac from August 5, 1862, until October 4, 1864. During the war, he took part in the Battle of Antietam, Gettysburg, the Wilderness and the siege of Petersburg as well as other minor engagements.

In July 1865, he began attending West Point and was eventually commissioned a second lieutenant and assigned to the 4th U.S. Cavalry on June 15, 1870. During the next several years, Carter would participate in a number of expeditions against the Comanche and other tribes in the Texas-area.

It was during one of these campaigns that he was brevetted first lieutenant and awarded the Medal of Honor for his "most distinguished gallantry" against the Comanche in Blanco Canyon on a tributary of the Brazos River on October 10, 1871. Carter would suffer a severe injury during the battle, his left leg being shattered as his horse fell against a rock, which would eventually result in his early retirement. He would officially receive the medal on January 23, 1900.

Returning to active duty, he joined Colonel Ranald Mackenzie in several campaigns, including against the Kickapoo of northern Mexico in May 1873 and was awarded a brevet to captain. He did win promotion to first lieutenant on February 21, 1875, although his leg injury disqualified him from active field duty and forced him to retire on June 28, 1876.

Although he eventually recovered from his leg injury after proper treatment, his requests to return to active service were denied by the US Army. Instead, he was promoted to captain on the retired list in 1904. He taught school and later headed the Washington-bureau of the Public Service Publishing Company in New York City. He would also write a number of booklets and books, including Four Brothers in Blue (1913) and The Old Sergeant's Story (1926). His most successful work was his memoir On the Border With Mackenzie (1935), which was published at the age of 90. He died at Washington, D.C., on January 4, 1936, and was buried in Arlington National Cemetery.

Captain Carter was a Companion of the Military Order of the Loyal Legion of the United States.

== Medal of Honor citation ==
Rank and organization: Second Lieutenant, 4th U.S. Cavalry. Place and date: On Brazos, River, Tex., October 10, 1871. Entered service at: Bradford, Mass. Birth: Bridgeport, Maine. Date of issue: February 27, 1900.

Citation:

Held the left of the line with a few men during the charge of a large body of Indians, after the right of the line had retreated, and by delivering a rapid fire succeeded in checking the enemy until other troops came to the rescue.

== Bibliography ==
=== Books ===
- The Boy Soldier at Gettysburg (1877)
- Four Brothers in Blue (1913)
- The Art and Science of War Versus the Art of Fighting (1922)
- The Old Sergeant's Story (1926)
- On the Border With Mackenzie (1935)

=== Pamphlets ===
- Record of the Military Service of First Lieutenant and Brevet Captain Robert Goldthwaite Carter, U.S. Army. (1904)
- Tragedies of Canon Blanco: A Story of the Texas Panhandle (1919)
- The Mackenzie Raid into Mexico (1919)
- Massacre of Salt Creek Prairie and the Cowboys' Verdict. (1919)
- On the Trail of Deserters: a Phenomenal Capture by Captain Robert Goldthwaite Carter. (1920)
- Pursuit of Kicking Bird: a Campaign in Texas 'Bad Lands'. (1920)

== See also ==
- List of Medal of Honor recipients
- List of Medal of Honor recipients for the Indian Wars
