= Maria Louisa Walsworth =

American missionary (1822–1858)

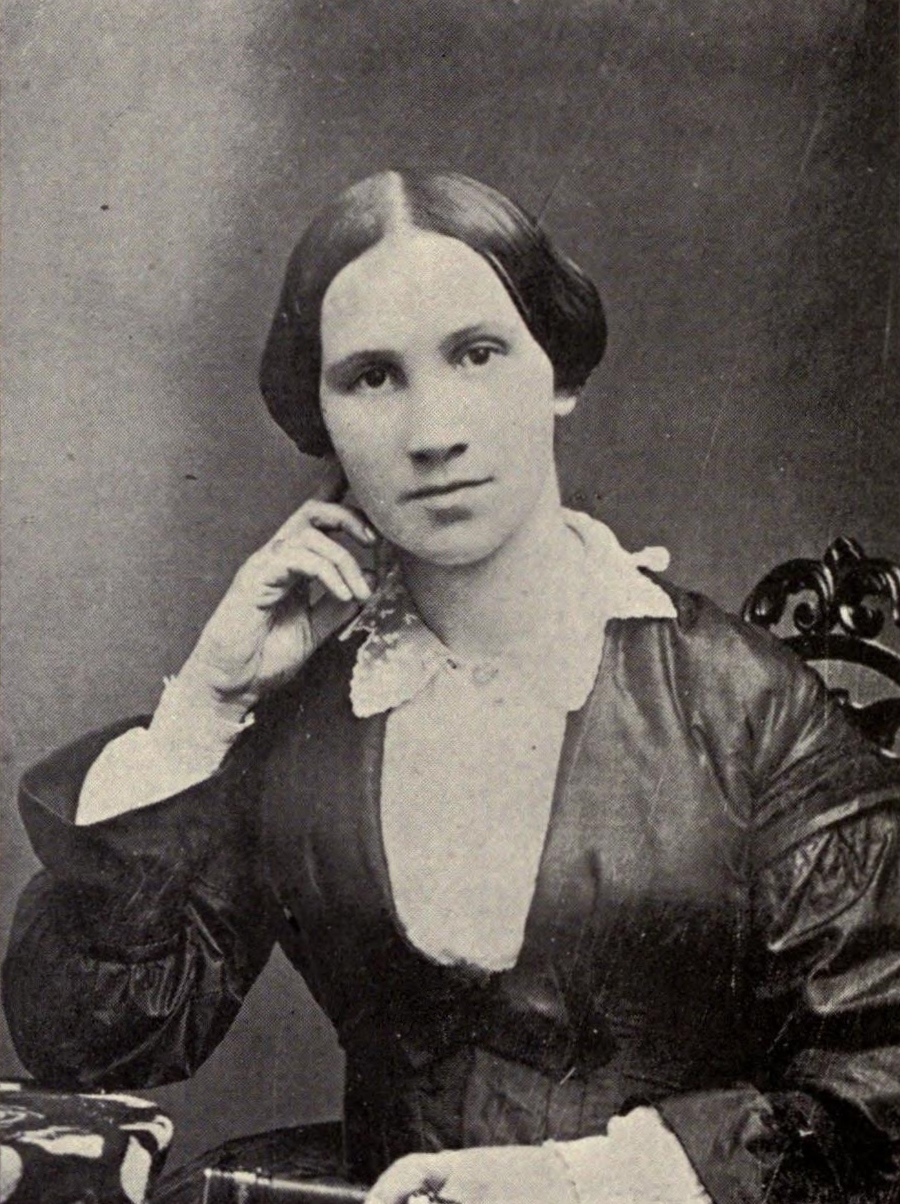
- Maria Louisa Walsworth, c. 1857
- Born: May 22, 1822; Cleveland, Ohio, U.S.
- Died: March 6, 1858 (aged 35); Hilo, Hawaii, U.S.
- Occupations: Missionary; teacher
- Spouses: Henry Kinney (m. 1847, death): Benjamin Pitman
- Children: Louisa (Lulie) Kinney; Henry Augustus Kinney; Harriet Sophia Kinney; Henry Hoʻolulu; Maria Kinoʻole Pitman

Maria Louisa Walsworth (May 22, 1822 – March 6, 1858) was an American missionary from the United States. She was a teacher at Punahou School. She was part of the original twelve companies of American Board of Commissioners for Foreign Missions (ABCFM) to the Sandwich Islands between 1820 and 1848.

== Early life ==
Walsworth was born on May 22, 1822 in Cleveland, Ohio.

== Career ==
She married Rev. Henry Kinney in West Bloomfield, New York, on September 6, 1847, when she was 25 years old. By October 1847, they were sailing aboard the Clipper ship, the “Somerset” to the Kingdom of Hawaii as members of the Twelfth Company of missionaries for the American Board of Commissioners for Foreign Missions.

== Personal life ==
They had three children together while living in Hilo, Louisa, Henry and Harriet. The family was heartbroken over the loss of their youngest, Harriet. She died 6 months after she was born. Word reached Dr. Charles Wetmore as he was summoned but the fever she had suffered, had taken her life already, and he could assist no further. With the permission of the ABCFM, the couple decided to take a break from their duties as missionaries. On July 13, 1854, aboard the schooner “The Restless”, the family departed the islands and sailed to Sonora, CA. to stay with the family of her sister Francis, whom also married an American Home Missionary Society Rev. Silas Sykes Harmon. Only 2 months after their arrival, her husband, Rev. Henry Kinney dies. The saddened Maria and her 2 children sailed back to Hilo, Hawaii. She married for the second time in Oahu to Benjamin Franklin Pitman, Esq., an American pioneer settler and whaler from Massachusetts. He was previously married to Chiefess Kinoʻole o Liliha, who controlled vast lands under King Kamehameha III. The Pitmans were quite prosperous and owned lands on the island of Hawaiʻi and in Honolulu. The wedding took place amongst friends on August 5, 1855, in Hilo. From this marriage they would have one daughter together, Maria Kinoole Pitman.

== Death and burial ==
Just weeks after giving birth, complications arose and Mrs. Benjamin F. Pitman died on March 6, 1858, in Hilo, Hawaii, at the age of 36. She was buried at the family plot of her uncle Rev. Silas Clark Brown, at West Bloomfield, New York.
