= James L. Haley =

American writer

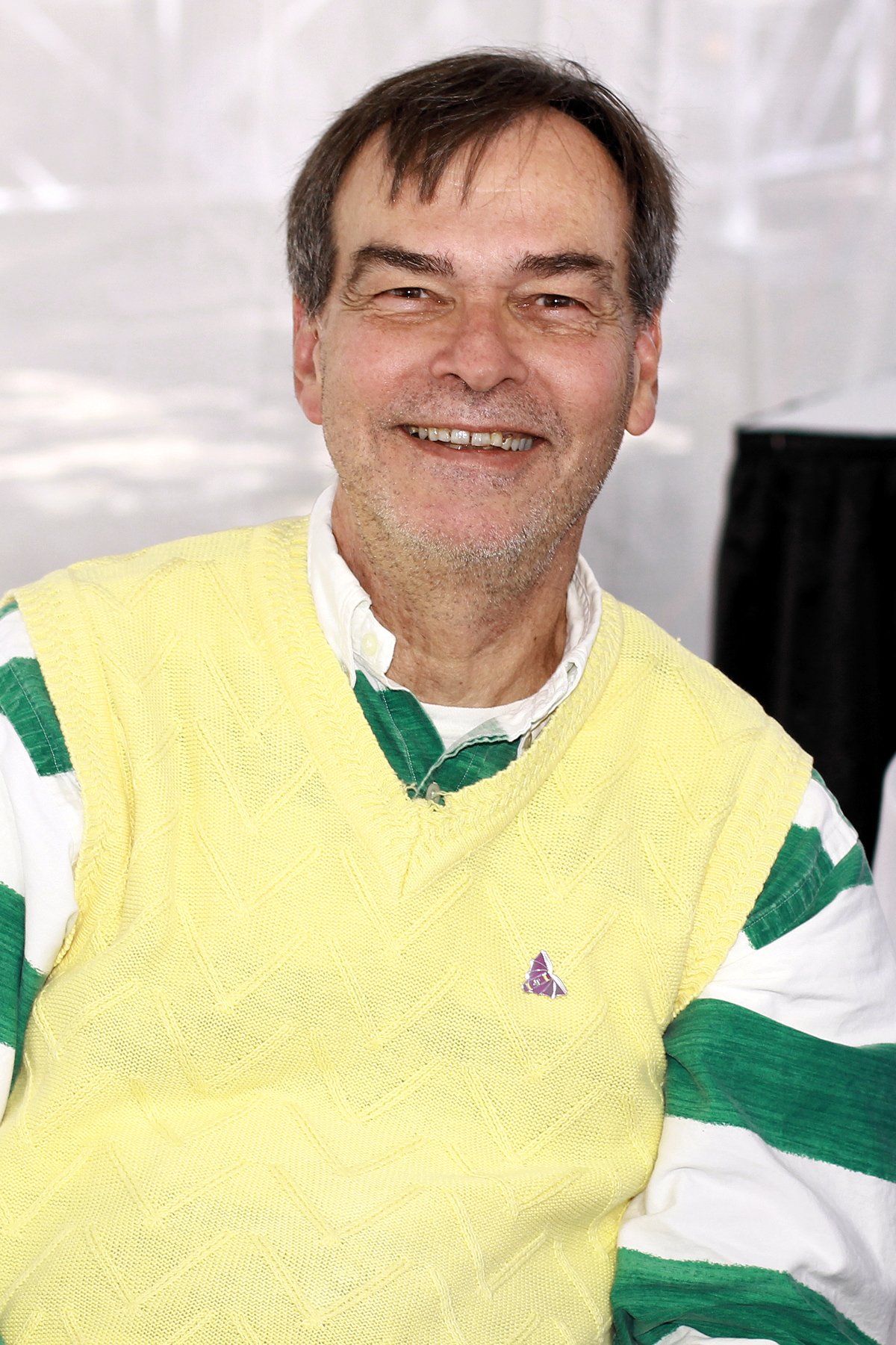
Haley at the 2019 Texas Book Festival

James L. Haley (born December 14, 1951) is an American writer on Texas and Western history. He has also written several novels. Haley grew up in Fort Worth, Texas, attended L. D. Bell High School in Hurst, Texas, and graduated from the University of Texas at Arlington with a degree in political science. He attended the University of Texas School of Law for two years before resigning to become a full-time writer. Haley's work has garnered many awards, including two Spur Awards (2002 and 2011) from the Western Writers of America.

== Books ==
=== Non-fiction ===
- The Buffalo War: The History of the Red River Indian Uprising of 1874 (Doubleday, 1976; State House Press, 1998)
- Apaches: A History and Culture Portrait (Doubleday, 1981; University of Oklahoma Press, 1997)
- Texas: An Album of History: From the Frontier to Spindletop (St. Martin's, 1991)
- Texas: From Spindletop through World War II (St. Martin's, 1993)
- Sam Houston (University of Oklahoma Press, 2002)
- Passionate Nation: The Epic History of Texas (Free Press, 2006)
- Wolf: The Lives of Jack London (Basic Books, 2010)
- Burleson Century: A History for the Centennial of Incorporation (The City of Burleson, Texas, 2012)
- The Texas Supreme Court: A Narrative History, 1836-1986 (University of Texas Press, 2013)
- Captive Paradise: A History of Hawaii (St. Martin's Press, 2014)

=== Fiction ===
- The Kings of San Carlos (Doubleday, 1987)
- The Lions of Tsavo (Bantam, 1989)
- Final Refuge: A Novel of Eco-Terrorism (St. Martin's, 1994)
- The Shores of Tripoli: Lieutenant Putnam and the Barbary Pirates (G. P. Putnam's Sons, 2016)
- A Darker Sea: Master Commandant Putnum and The War of 1812 (G. P. Putnam's Sons, 2017)
- The Devil in Paradise: Captain Putnum in Hawaii (G. P. Putnam's Sons, 2019)
- Captain Putnam for the Republic of Texas (G. P. Putnam's Sons, 2021)
