= 1921 Chicago White Sox season =

1921 Chicago White Sox
- League: American League
- Ballpark: Comiskey Park
- City: Chicago, Illinois
- Record: 62–92 (.403)
- League place: 7th
- Owners: Charles Comiskey
- Managers: Kid Gleason

The 1921 Chicago White Sox season involved the White Sox attempting to win the American League pennant. However, with the core of the team banned after the Black Sox Scandal broke, they fell back to seventh place.

== Regular season ==
Owner Charles Comiskey struggled to find replacements for his stars. For example, new third baseman Eddie Mulligan had a .623 OPS, lowest among the team's regulars and quite a drop from Buck Weaver's .785 in 1920.

The pitching staff took a much worse beating. Chicago had lost its two best starters in Eddie Cicotte and Lefty Williams and could not recover. Red Faber won 25 games with a league-leading 2.48 ERA. The only other pitcher over .500 was Dickey Kerr, who indeed allowed more hits and earned runs than anyone else in the majors. Number three starter Roy Wilkinson went 4–20, and nobody else started more than 10 games.

=== Season standings ===
American League
Team	W	L	Pct.	GB	Home	Road
New York Yankees	98	55	.641	—	53‍–‍25	45‍–‍30
Cleveland Indians	94	60	.610	4½	51‍–‍26	43‍–‍34
St. Louis Browns	81	73	.526	17½	43‍–‍34	38‍–‍39
Washington Senators	80	73	.523	18	46‍–‍30	34‍–‍43
Boston Red Sox	75	79	.487	23½	41‍–‍36	34‍–‍43
Detroit Tigers	71	82	.464	27	37‍–‍40	34‍–‍42
Chicago White Sox	62	92	.403	36½	37‍–‍40	25‍–‍52
Philadelphia Athletics	53	100	.346	45	28‍–‍47	25‍–‍53

=== Record vs. opponents ===
1921 American League record Sources:
Team	BOS	CWS	CLE	DET	NYY	PHA	SLB	WSH
Boston	—	15–7	8–14	15–7	7–15	12–10	9–13	9–13
Chicago	7–15	—	7–15	8–14	13–9	14–8	7–15	6–16
Cleveland	14–8	15–7	—	13–9	8–14	15–7	17–5	12–10
Detroit	7–15	14–8	9–13	—	5–17	14–7–1	12–10	10–12
New York	15–7	9–13	14–8	17–5	—	17–5	13–9	13–8
Philadelphia	10–12	8–14	7–15	7–14–1	5–17	—	5–17	11–11–1
St. Louis	13–9	15–7	5–17	10–12	9–13	17–5	—	12–10
Washington	13–9	16–6	10–12	12–10	8–13	11–11–1	10–12	—

=== Roster ===
1921 Chicago White Sox
Roster
Pitchers: Bugs Bennett; Verne Blackbourn; Sarge Connally; Lum Davenport; Red Faber; Hod Fenner; Shovel Hodge; Dickey Kerr; Doug McWeeny; John Michaelson; Dominic Mulrenan; Rusty Pence; John Russell; Lee Thompson; Cy Twombly; Jack Wieneke; Roy Wilkinson	Catchers: George Lees; Ray Schalk; Yam Yaryan; Infielders: Eddie Collins; Ernie Johnson; Elmer Leifer; Hervey McClellan; Eddie Mulligan; Earl Sheely	Outfielders: Fred Bratschi; Bibb Falk; Harry Hooper; Johnny Mostil; Amos Strunk; Other batters: Eddie Murphy; Red Ostergard; Frank Pratt	Manager: Kid Gleason

== Player stats ==
=== Batting ===
==== Starters by position ====
Note: Pos = Position; G = Games played; AB = At bats; H = Hits; Avg. = Batting average; HR = Home runs; RBI = Runs batted in

Pos	Player	G	AB	H	Avg.	HR	RBI
C	Ray Schalk	128	416	105	.252	0	47
1B	Earl Sheely	154	563	171	.304	11	95
2B	Eddie Collins	139	526	177	.337	2	58
3B	Eddie Mulligan	151	609	153	.251	1	45
SS	Ernie Johnson	142	613	181	.295	1	51
OF	Amos Strunk	121	401	133	.332	3	69
OF	Harry Hooper	108	419	137	.327	3	58
OF	Bibb Falk	152	585	167	.285	5	82

==== Other batters ====
Note: G = Games played; AB = At bats; H = Hits; Avg. = Batting average; HR = Home runs; RBI = Runs batted in

Player	G	AB	H	Avg.	HR	RBI
Johnny Mostil	100	326	98	.301	3	42
Harvey McClellan	63	196	35	.179	1	14
Yam Yaryan	45	102	31	.304	0	15
George Lees	20	42	9	.214	0	4
Fred Bratschi	16	28	8	.286	0	3
Red Ostergard	12	11	4	.364	0	0
Elmer Leifer	9	10	3	.300	0	1
Eddie Murphy	6	5	1	.200	0	0
Frank Pratt	1	1	0	.000	0	0

=== Pitching ===
==== Starting pitchers ====
Note: G = Games pitched; IP = Innings pitched; W = Wins; L = Losses; ERA = Earned run average; SO = Strikeouts

Player	G	IP	W	L	ERA	SO
Red Faber	43	330.2	25	15	2.48	124
Dickey Kerr	44	308.2	19	17	4.72	80
John Russell	11	66.1	2	5	5.29	15
Dominic Mulrenan	12	56.0	2	8	7.23	10
Lee Thompson	4	20.2	0	3	8.27	4

==== Other pitchers ====
Note: G = Games pitched; IP = Innings pitched; W = Wins; L = Losses; ERA = Earned run average; SO = Strikeouts

Player	G	IP	W	L	ERA	SO
Roy Wilkinson	32	198.1	4	20	5.13	50
Shovel Hodge	36	142.2	6	8	6.56	25
Doug McWeeny	27	97.2	3	6	6.08	46
Cy Twombly	7	27.2	1	2	5.86	7
Jack Wieneke	10	25.1	0	1	8.17	10
Sarge Connally	5	22.1	0	1	6.45	6
Bugs Bennett	3	17.2	0	3	6.11	2
Hod Fenner	2	7.0	0	0	7.71	1

==== Relief pitchers ====
Note: G = Games pitched; W = Wins; L = Losses; SV = Saves; ERA = Earned run average; SO = Strikeouts

Player	G	W	L	SV	ERA	SO
Lum Davenport	13	0	3	0	6.88	9
Rusty Pence	4	0	0	0	8.44	2
John Michaelson	2	0	0	0	10.13	1
Verne Blackbourn	1	0	0	0	0.00	0

== Awards and honors ==
=== League top ten finishers ===
Red Faber

- MLB leader in ERA (2.48)
- #3 in AL in wins (25)
- #4 in AL in strikeouts (124)

Dickey Kerr

- MLB leader in earned runs allowed (162)
- MLB leader in hits allowed (357)
- #3 in AL in losses (17)
- #3 in AL in walks allowed (96)

Roy Wilkinson

- #2 in AL in losses (20)
