= 1921 Washington Senators season =

1921 Washington Senators
- League: American League
- Ballpark: Griffith Stadium
- City: Washington, D.C.
- Record: 80–73 (.523)
- League place: 4th
- Owners: Clark Griffith and William Richardson
- Managers: George McBride

The 1921 Washington Senators won 80 games, lost 73, and finished in fourth place in the American League. They were managed by George McBride and played home games at Griffith Stadium.

== Regular season ==
=== Season standings ===
American League
Team	W	L	Pct.	GB	Home	Road
New York Yankees	98	55	.641	—	53‍–‍25	45‍–‍30
Cleveland Indians	94	60	.610	4½	51‍–‍26	43‍–‍34
St. Louis Browns	81	73	.526	17½	43‍–‍34	38‍–‍39
Washington Senators	80	73	.523	18	46‍–‍30	34‍–‍43
Boston Red Sox	75	79	.487	23½	41‍–‍36	34‍–‍43
Detroit Tigers	71	82	.464	27	37‍–‍40	34‍–‍42
Chicago White Sox	62	92	.403	36½	37‍–‍40	25‍–‍52
Philadelphia Athletics	53	100	.346	45	28‍–‍47	25‍–‍53

=== Record vs. opponents ===
1921 American League record Sources:
Team	BOS	CWS	CLE	DET	NYY	PHA	SLB	WSH
Boston	—	15–7	8–14	15–7	7–15	12–10	9–13	9–13
Chicago	7–15	—	7–15	8–14	13–9	14–8	7–15	6–16
Cleveland	14–8	15–7	—	13–9	8–14	15–7	17–5	12–10
Detroit	7–15	14–8	9–13	—	5–17	14–7–1	12–10	10–12
New York	15–7	9–13	14–8	17–5	—	17–5	13–9	13–8
Philadelphia	10–12	8–14	7–15	7–14–1	5–17	—	5–17	11–11–1
St. Louis	13–9	15–7	5–17	10–12	9–13	17–5	—	12–10
Washington	13–9	16–6	10–12	12–10	8–13	11–11–1	10–12	—

=== Notable transactions ===
- August 3, 1921: Bobby LaMotte was purchased by the Senators from the Tampa Smokers.

=== Roster ===
1921 Washington Senators
Roster
Pitchers: José Acosta; Red Bird; Harry Courtney; Eric Erickson; Nemo Gaines; Walter Johnson; Vance McIlree; Ralph Miller; George Mogridge; Tom Phillips; Al Schacht; Jim Shaw; Frank Woodward; Tom Zachary	Catchers: Tony Brottem; Patsy Gharrity; Val Picinich; Ricardo Torres; Infielders: Donie Bush; George Foss; Bucky Harris; Joe Judge; Bobby LaMotte; Frank O'Rourke; Howie Shanks	Outfielders: Frank Brower; Goose Goslin; Duffy Lewis; Clyde Milan; Bing Miller; Sam Rice; Earl Smith; Other batters: Frank Ellerbe	Manager: George McBride

== Player stats ==
=== Batting ===
==== Starters by position ====
Note: Pos = Position; G = Games played; AB = At bats; H = Hits; Avg. = Batting average; HR = Home runs; RBI = Runs batted in

Pos	Player	G	AB	H	Avg.	HR	RBI
C	Patsy Gharrity	121	387	120	.310	7	55
1B	Joe Judge	153	622	187	.301	7	72
2B	Bucky Harris	154	584	169	.289	0	54
SS	Frank O'Rourke	123	444	104	.234	3	54
3B	Howie Shanks	154	562	170	.302	7	69
OF	Bing Miller	114	420	121	.288	9	71
OF	Clyde Milan	113	406	117	.288	1	40
OF	Sam Rice	143	561	185	.330	4	79

==== Other batters ====
Note: G = Games played; AB = At bats; H = Hits; Avg. = Batting average; HR = Home runs; RBI = Runs batted in

Player	G	AB	H	Avg.	HR	RBI
Frank Brower	83	203	53	.261	1	35
Earl Smith	59	180	39	.217	2	12
Val Picinich	45	141	39	.277	0	12
Duffy Lewis	27	102	19	.186	0	14
Donie Bush	23	84	18	.214	0	2
Goose Goslin	14	50	13	.260	1	6
Bobby LaMotte	16	41	8	.195	0	2
Frank Ellerbe	10	10	2	.200	0	1
Tony Brottem	4	7	1	.143	0	0
George Foss	4	7	0	.000	0	0
Ricardo Torres	2	3	1	.333	0	0

=== Pitching ===
==== Starting pitchers ====
Note: G = Games pitched; IP = Innings pitched; W = Wins; L = Losses; ERA = Earned run average; SO = Strikeouts

Player	G	IP	W	L	ERA	SO
George Mogridge	38	288.0	18	14	3.00	101
Walter Johnson	35	264.0	17	14	3.51	143
Tom Zachary	39	250.0	18	16	3.96	53
Eric Erickson	32	179.0	8	10	3.62	71
Tom Phillips	1	9.0	1	0	2.00	2

==== Other pitchers ====
Note: G = Games pitched; IP = Innings pitched; W = Wins; L = Losses; ERA = Earned run average; SO = Strikeouts

Player	G	IP	W	L	ERA	SO
Harry Courtney	30	132.2	6	9	5.63	26
José Acosta	33	115.2	5	4	4.36	30
Al Schacht	29	82.2	6	6	4.90	15
Jim Shaw	15	40.1	1	0	7.36	4
Frank Woodward	3	10.2	0	0	5.91	4

==== Relief pitchers ====
Note: G = Games pitched; W = Wins; L = Losses; SV = Saves; ERA = Earned run average; SO = Strikeouts

Player	G	W	L	SV	ERA	SO
Nemo Gaines	4	0	0	0	0.00	1
Red Bird	1	0	0	0	5.40	2
Ralph Miller	1	0	0	0	0.00	0
Vance McIlree	1	0	0	0	9.00	0
