= Frank Pratt =

Frank Pratt may refer to:

- Frank Pratt (baseball) (1897–1974), baseball player
- Frank Pratt (politician) (1942–2021), Arizona politician
- Frank Pratt (racing driver) in 1948 Australian Grand Prix

== See also ==
- Francis Pratt (disambiguation)
- Franklin Seaver Pratt (1829–1894), Hawaiian politician and businessman
