= Francis Pratt =

Francis Pratt may refer to:

- Francis A. Pratt, engineer
- Francis Pratt (baseball)

== See also ==
- Frank Pratt (disambiguation)
