= The Year Babe Ruth Hit 104 Home Runs =

2007 book by Bill Jenkinson

- First edition
- Author: Bill Jenkinson
- Language: English
- Subjects: Baseball, Babe Ruth, Home Runs
- Genre: Non-fiction
- Publisher: Carroll & Graf Publishers
- Publication date: 2007
- Publication place: United States
- ISBN: 0-7867-1906-0
- OCLC: 83609728

The Year Babe Ruth Hit 104 Home Runs is a 432-page non-fiction book by Bill Jenkinson published by Carroll & Graf Publishers in March 2007. The title refers to Jenkinson's conclusion that in modern ballparks under modern rules, Ruth would have hit 104 home runs in 1921, 90 in some other seasons, and over 60 many times. The author's research concludes that Ruth would have hit well over a thousand home runs in his career.

According to the introduction, the book is not a Babe Ruth biography but is a factual treatise of Ruth's power and his dominance of the game of baseball.

== Book summary ==
The book is in three major sections, "Part 1: The Career", "Part Two: The Analysis", and "Part Three: The Facts".

The first section is devoted to a year-by-year recap of Babe Ruth's career. It starts in 1914 and runs through Ruth's final season in 1935. Each chapter features personal highlights and picks out Ruth's longest home runs, essentially hitting the longest home run in every stadium he played in.

"The Analysis" section presents arguments about the comparative difficulty of playing in Ruth's era of longer fields versus playing on the shorter fields of modern stadiums. It covers traveling conditions and other factors of the differing eras, and includes a detailed recap of Ruth's so-called "hidden career" - his time playing exhibition games. The section also covers and illustrates Ruth's pure power.

The third section features charts, graphs and other detailed statistical information that backs up the data from the previous sections. Included in this section is a listing of every home run and long fly ball Ruth ever hit, aerial photographs of the stadiums Ruth played in, and final home run projections.

== Tape measure home runs ==
On pages 300–339, the author lists every home run hit by Ruth during his career, along with estimated distances that the ball flew in each case. According to Jenkinson's estimates, a sizable number of Ruth's homers exceeded 500 feet (the official record is Mickey Mantle's 565-foot home run at Griffith Stadium in 1953, off Chuck Stobbs, although other long home runs, such as Dave Nicholson's 1964 573-foot blast onto or over the left-field roof of Comiskey Park, occurred), and many exceeded 450. Some were less than 300, in the widely variant dimensions of ballparks of that era. From that long list, as well as discussion in other parts of the book, some of Ruth's longest home runs at each ballpark can be summarized. Ruth was especially prolific in his great 1921 season:

- Plant Field, Tampa, Florida, April 4, 1919 – estimates range from 540 to 612 feet – off George Smith – spring training game, Red Sox hosting New York Giants – landed on outside railing of horse race track in deep right center field.
- Griffith Stadium, Washington, D.C., May 7, 1921 – 520 feet – off Walter Johnson – cleared the high wall in center field.
- Sportsman's Park, St. Louis, Missouri, May 25, 1921 – 535 feet – off Urban Shocker – straightaway center field, behind the bleachers.
- Navin Field, Detroit, July 18, 1921 – 575 feet – off Bert Cole – possibly 600 feet – longest verifiable home run in major league history – no double deck at that time, only low-profile bleachers.
- Polo Grounds, New York, July 31, 1921 – 560 feet – off Ray Caldwell of Cleveland – over deep right center field double deck roof.
- Comiskey Park, Chicago, Aug 17, 1921 – 550 feet – off Jack Wieneke – deep right center field – single deck bleachers at that time.
- Fenway Park, Boston, May 25, 1926 – 545 feet – off Paul Zahniser – 45th row of deep right center field bleachers.
- League Park, Cleveland, Aug 6, 1926 – 510 feet – off (Emile) Dutch Levsen – deep over high fence, right center field, landing across street.
- Artillery Park, Wilkes-Barre, Pennsylvania, Oct 12 1926- 600–650 feet. Ruth came to the Wyoming Valley on October 12 to take part in an exhibition game between Hughestown and Larksville. After challenging Larksville pitcher Ernie Corkran to throw his fastest pitch over the plate, Ruth cracked what is now deemed to be the longest home run ball ever hit in the entirety of baseball history (and not just in the history of professional baseball). The day after the exhibition game, the Associated Press gave a descriptive account of Ruth's blast.

"The ball cleared the right field fence 400 feet from the plate by more than 40 feet and was still ascending. The ball landed on the far side of the running track of a high school athletic field in Kirby Park. Officials estimated the length at 650 feet." Per Associated Press report the day after the home run.

- Comiskey Park, Chicago, Illinois, Aug 16, 1927 – 520 feet – off (Alphonse) Tommy Thomas – over the 75 ft high right field roof, the first homer to clear Comiskey's roof.
- Shibe Park, Philadelphia, May 22, 1930 – 540 feet – off Howard Ehmke – deep over right field, clearing row houses and landing next street over.

On pp.272-273, the author reports a story told to him by his own father. When he was 14, his uncle had taken him to Shibe Park, and they bought the cheapest seats possible – on the rooftops across the street behind right field. He was feeling disconnected from the game, until the third inning, when Ruth sent a rifle shot (or so it sounded to the young teen) over his head and over two rows of flats. He told the author that Ruth "pulled me inside the park with him; all of a sudden, it was like I was in the infield."

- Yankee Stadium, Bronx, New York, May 24, 1930 – 535 feet – deep RCF – off George 'Rube' Walberg of Philadelphia – deep right-center field bleachers (Ruth never hit one out of Yankee Stadium except in batting practice).
- Wrigley Field, Chicago, October 1, 1932 – 490 feet – off Charlie Root – known as "Babe Ruth's called shot".
- Forbes Field, Pittsburgh, Pennsylvania – May 25, 1935 – 540 feet – off Guy Bush – first roof shot at Forbes – hit house across Bouquet St – third homer of the day, final homer of his career.

== Bill Jenkinson, the author ==
Bill Jenkinson is a renowned baseball scholar. He resides in Willow Grove, Pennsylvania, and is a member of the Society for American Baseball Research (SABR). He has been a consultant for The National Baseball Hall of Fame and Museum, ESPN and Major League Baseball. The book is dedicated to his wife, Marie Jenkinson. Jenkinson's second book, Baseball's Ultimate Power, was released in March 2010.
