= Elizabeth Kekaʻaniau =

Hawaiian chief, great grandniece of Kamehameha I (1834–1928)

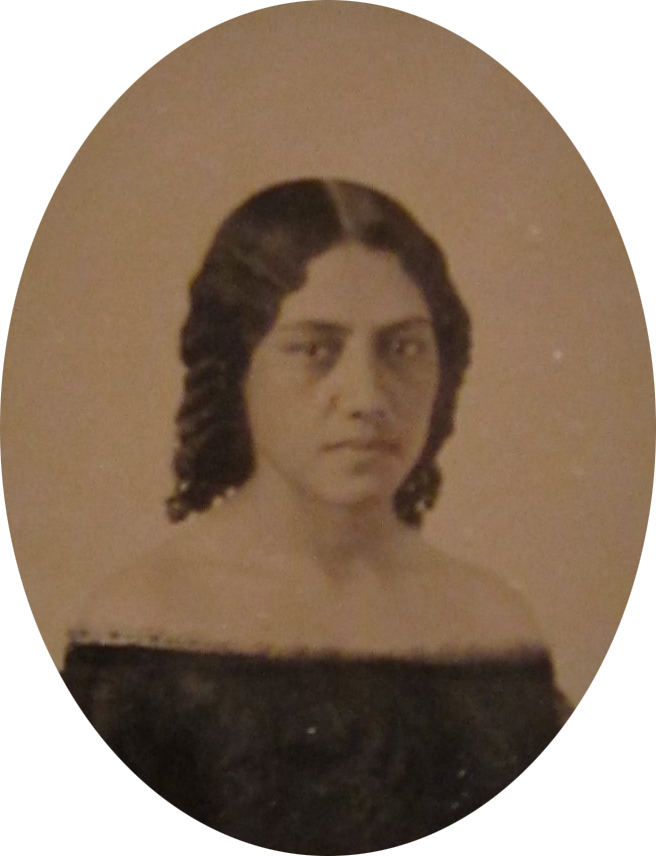
- Kekaʻaniau, c. 1859
- Born: September 11, 1834; Laʻanui Estate, Waialua, Oahu, Kingdom of Hawaii
- Died: December 20, 1928 (aged 94); Makiki, Honolulu, Oahu, Territory of Hawaii
- Burial: December 23, 1928; Oahu Cemetery
- Spouse: Franklin Seaver Pratt (m. 1864)
- Issue: Theresa Owana Kaʻōhelelani Laʻanui (adopted); Eva Kuwailanimamao Cartwright (adopted)
Names
- Elizabeth Kekaʻaniauokalani Kalaninuiohilaukapu Kekaikuihala Laʻanui
- House: House of Kamehameha; House of Laʻanui
- Father: Gideon Peleʻioholani Laʻanui
- Mother: Theresa Owana Kaheiheimalie Rives
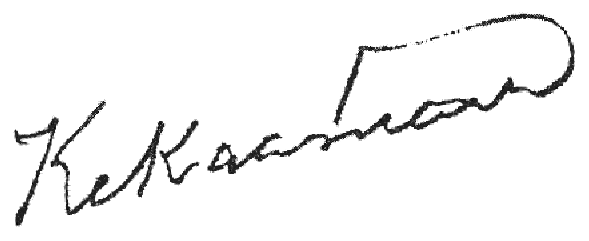
- Signature

Elizabeth Kekaʻaniau Laʻanui Pratt, full name Elizabeth Kekaʻaniauokalani Kalaninuiohilaukapu Kekaikuihala Laʻanui Pratt (September 11, 1834 – December 20, 1928), was a Hawaiian high chiefess (aliʻi) and great-grandniece of Kamehameha I, being a great-granddaughter of Kalokuokamaile, the older brother of Kamehameha I, founder of the Kingdom of Hawaii. She was the daughter of Gideon Peleʻioholani Laʻanui and Theresa Owana Kaheiheimalie Rives.

At a young age, Kekaʻaniau was chosen to attend the Chiefs' Children's School (later renamed the Royal School) taught by American missionaries and declared eligible to succeed to the Hawaiian throne by King Kamehameha III. She married American businessman Franklin Seaver Pratt and became known as Mrs. Pratt. Five of her classmates became reigning monarchs of Hawaii until the 1893 overthrow of the Kingdom of Hawaii. In 1920, she wrote History of Keoua Kalanikupuapa-i-nui: Father of Hawaii Kings, and His Descendants, a book about her ancestor Keōua and his descendants including her own branch of the family and the House of Kamehameha. Outliving all her royal classmates, she was the last surviving member of the Royal School.

== Early life and education ==
High Chiefess Elizabeth Kekaʻaniauokalani Kalaninuiohilaukapu Kekaikuihala Laʻanui was born September 11, 1834, in her family home at Waialua. Her parents were Gideon Peleʻioholani Laʻanui and Theresa Owana Kaheiheimalie Rives. She was given the name Elizabeth after Kaʻahumanu who had adopted her mother and was baptized with the name. Kaʻahumanu was a favorite wife of Kamehameha I and the co-ruler of the kingdom under the title of Kuhina Nui. She was also the namesake of Kekaikuihala II, her father's older sister. Her younger brother Gideon Kailipalaki Laʻanui was born in 1840, and despite medical treatment by missionary physician Gerrit P. Judd, their mother died two months afterward from complications from childbirth. Laʻanui later married on July 9, 1842, to Amelia Puohu, who became the children's stepmother.

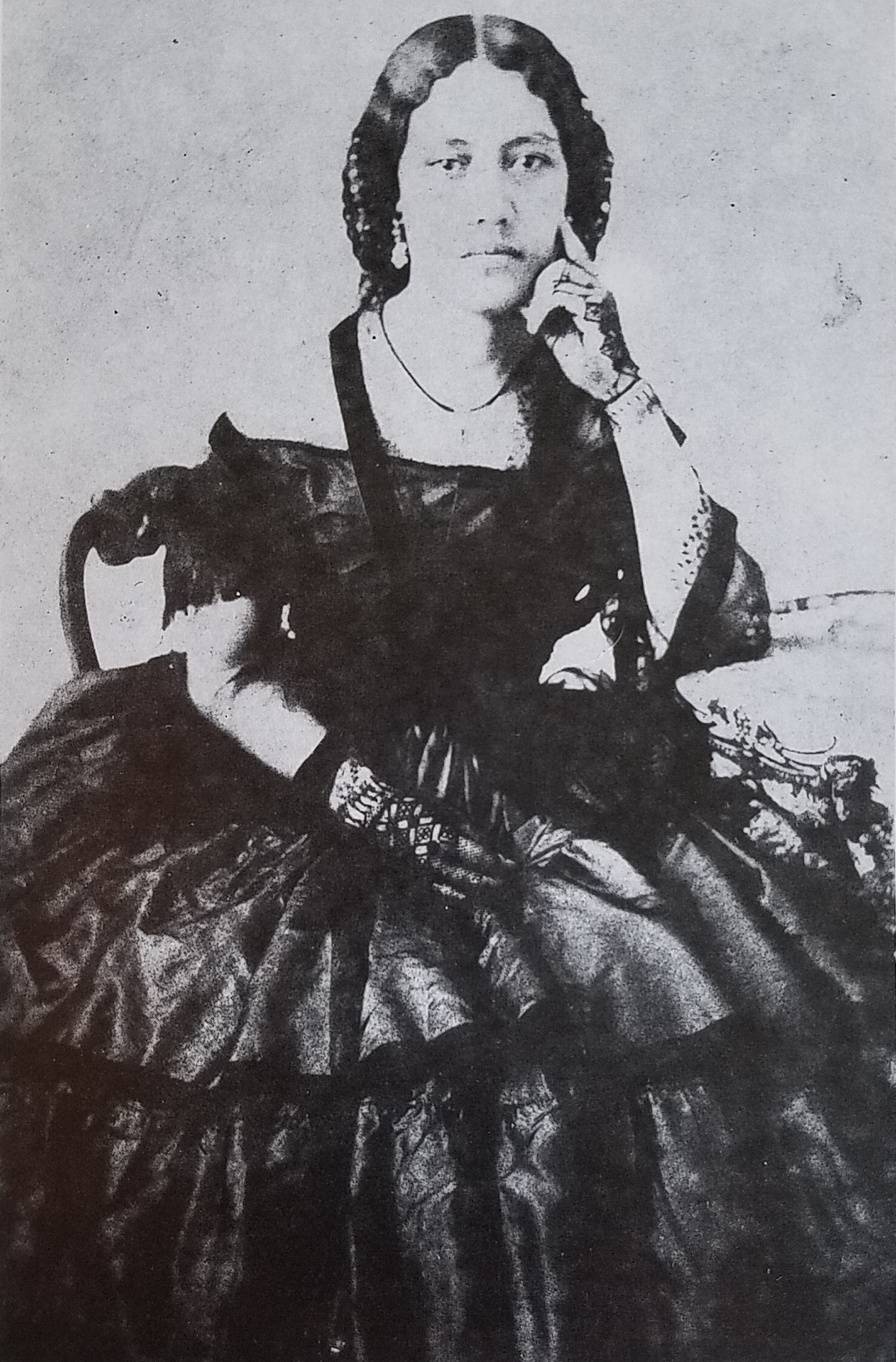
Elizabeth Kekaʻaniau as a young woman, photograph by Henry L. Chase

Her family were of the aliʻi class of the Hawaiian nobility and were collateral relations of the reigning House of Kamehameha, sharing common descent from the early 18th-century aliʻi Keōua Kalanikupuapaʻīkalaninui Ahilapalapa. From her father's side, Kekaʻaniau was a great-granddaughter of Kalokuokamaile, an elder half-brother of Kamehameha I. Both were sons of the aforementioned Keōua. Due to this familial tie, her father Laʻanui escaped the slaughter of Kawaihae in 1791 where Kamehameha I defeated and sacrificed his opponent Keōua Kūʻahuʻula in the process of unifying the Hawaiian Islands. Her mother Owana was the daughter of Kamehameha II's French secretary Jean Baptiste Rives and a relation of Kaʻahumanu through her mother Holau II, who was hānai (adopted) by the queen. Also through her father's first marriage to Namahana Piʻia, Kekaʻaniau was the stepniece of Kaʻahumanu. She was of one-fourth French and three-fourths Native Hawaiian descent.

At a young age, Kekaʻaniau was placed in the Chiefs' Children's School, also known as the Royal School, a select school for the royal children of the highest rank who were eligible to be rulers. Along with her other classmates, she was chosen by Kamehameha III to be eligible for the throne of the Kingdom of Hawaii. Out of the sixteen children of the school, five of her cousins would rule as monarchs of the kingdom. Called Lizzy or Lizzie by her classmates, she was taught by the missionary couple Juliette Montague Cooke and Amos Starr Cooke. In the classroom students were divided by their age and length of time at the school. She was a member of the senior level class. At age nine, Kekaʻaniau weighed 41 pounds (19 kg), which was relatively small for her age among her classmates. During their Sunday procession to church, when it was customary for boys and girls to walk side by side, she would walk beside James Kaliokalani, the eldest brother of future monarchs Kalākaua and Liliʻuokalani.

During their school years, Kekaʻaniau developed a close relationship with her cousins Emma (who married Kamehameha IV and became queen consort) and Bernice Pauahi Bishop, who later founded Kamehameha Schools. She was one of the few invited guests at the 1850 wedding of Bernice Pauahi to American businessman Charles Reed Bishop, which was conducted against the wishes of Pauahi's parents, and she also later served as bridesmaid to Queen Emma during her royal wedding in 1856. She was also one of the bridesmaids at the 1862 wedding of Liliʻuokalani and John Owen Dominis. Kekaʻaniau was among the young social elite active in the royal courts of Kamehameha IV and his successor Kamehameha V. On formal occasions, she would also serve as lady-in-waiting to Queen Emma.

== Marriage ==
Kekaʻaniau married Franklin Seaver Pratt (1829–1894) on April 27, 1864. The wedding was held at the residence of the bride, and Reverend Eli S. Corwin, the pastor of the Fort Street (Congregational) Church, officiated the ceremony. According to contemporary opinion, she was "well-known as one of the brightest and most cultivated women of Honolulu" and "became his faithful companion and helper" after their marriage. A native of Boston, Massachusetts, and naturalized citizen of the kingdom, Pratt was a respected businessman and sugar plantation owner who held a few court and governmental positions during the monarchy, including Staff Colonel to Kamehameha V, member of the Privy Council for Queen Liliʻuokalani, Registrar of Public Accounts and Hawaiian Consul General in San Francisco. However, according to historian James L. Haley, he was kept on the "periphery of power."

The Pratts did not have any children of their own, although they adopted Kekaʻaniau's niece, Theresa Owana Kaʻōhelelani Laʻanui, daughter of her younger brother High Chief Gideon Kailipalaki Laʻanui II, after he died in 1871. Theresa married four times and had descendants by her first and second husbands: Alexander Cartwright III, son of Honolulu fire chief Alexander Cartwright, and Robert William Wilcox, a Hawaiian revolutionary leader and the first Congressional Delegate from the Territory of Hawaii. The Pratts also later adopted Alexander and Theresa's younger daughter Eva Kuwailanimamao Cartwright, who married Dwight Jarvis Styne and had three children. The Pratts owned a beachside residence, which they called the Franklin Villa or Bath Villa, in the Waikīkī area of Honolulu. The property was sold in 1897 and is now part of Fort DeRussy.

Kekaʻaniau was present at the deathbed of King Kamehameha V in 1872 with Queen Emma, Pauahi and other members of the royal court. It is later claimed by her descendants that the dying monarch had offered her the throne before asking Pauahi to succeed him. Haley noted that if this was true she would have been a strong candidate, being a descendant of an elder brother of the kingdom's founder. The personal writings of John Owen Dominis, husband of Liliʻuokalani, only described Kamehameha V offering the throne to Pauahi and that Kekaʻaniau was seated with Queen Emma and both were too far to hear the conversation. Neither woman accepted, and Kamehameha V died without naming an heir. Thus, the 1864 Constitution of the Kingdom of Hawaii called for the legislature to elect the next monarch. By both popular vote and the unanimous vote of the legislature, her cousin Lunalilo became the first elected king of Hawaii. Kekaʻaniau was given a place of honor at the prorogation of the Legislative Assembly of 1873 alongside Queen Emma, High Chiefess Fanny Kekelaokalani, and wives of the king's cabinet ministers. After the death of Lunalilo in 1874, the Pratts became supporters of Queen Emma during her unsuccessful candidacy during the royal election of 1874 against Kalākaua. Emma had promised to reward their loyalty with a government appointment by removing Dominis as Governor of Oahu and appointing Pratt in his place if she had won. Despite popular support for the queen dowager, the assembly voted thirty-nine to six in favor of Kalākaua over Emma. The subsequent announcement triggered the Honolulu Courthouse riot as Emmaite supporters hunted down and attacked native legislators who supported Kalākaua. In order to quell the civil disruption, American and British troops were landed with the permission of the Hawaiian government, and the rioters were arrested.

During the final years of the monarchy, the Pratts lived in San Francisco where her husband served as Hawaiian Consul General for the Pacific states of Oregon, Washington, California and Nevada, from 1892 until the time of the overthrow of the Kingdom of Hawaii.

In March 1893, she was elected as an honorary president of Hui Aloha ʻĀina o Na Wahine (Hawaiian Women's Patriotic League) or Hui Aloha ʻĀina for Women. This patriotic group was founded shortly after its male counterpart the Hui Aloha ʻĀina for Men to oppose the overthrow and plans to annex the islands to the United States and to support the deposed queen Liliʻuokalani. She resigned this position on April 17, 1893, after a dispute arose between two factions of the group over the wordings to the memorial seeking the restoration of the monarchy to be presented to the United States Commissioner James Henderson Blount sent by President Grover Cleveland to investigate the overthrow.

== Later life and civic involvement ==
After the overthrow in 1893, her husband defended Kekaʻaniau's traditional claims to the Hawaiian crown lands as an heir of Kamehameha III and was removed from his government post as Hawaiian Consul. These lands transferred to the United States Federal Government after the annexation of the Hawaiian Islands in 1898. During Queen Liliʻuokalani's attempts to seek restitution and compensation for the lost crown lands, Kekaʻaniau and her niece Theresa Laʻanui petitioned in 1903 the Senate Subcommittee on the Pacific Islands and Puerto Rico in order to support the petition of the queen.

In 1895, she helped found the Hawaiian Relief Society to assist the victims of a cholera epidemic in the islands. She co-founded the organization with other leading Hawaiian women including Emma Kaili Metcalf Beckley Nakuina, Abigail Kuaihelani Campbell and Emilie Widemann Macfarlane. She served as the organization's first vice-president.

Because of her rank and connection to the past, Kekaʻaniau participated in many civic ceremonies during her later life. On June 28, 1909, Kekaʻaniau officiated and unveiled the tablet of the 1795 Battle of Nuʻuanu, which was installed at the Pali lookout by the organization Daughters of Hawaii. On March 17, 1912, she officiated with Queen Liliʻuokalani when they both unveiled the Cooke Memorial Tablet, dedicated to Amos Starr and Juiette Montague Cooke and the sixteen students of the Royal School, in the vestibule of Kawaiahaʻo Church. The ceremony marked the 100th anniversary of the birth of Mrs. Cooke. On March 17, 1914, Kekaʻaniau officiated with Liliʻuokalani at the unveiling of the tablet for the 100th commemoration birthday of King Kamehameha III. During the ceremony, Queen Liliʻuokalani represented the Kalakaua Dynasty, and Kekaʻaniau represented the Kamehameha Dynasty, seated on opposite sides of the memorial stone in the nave of the church. The palace chairs in which they sat were draped with ancient Hawaiian feather capes. The Queen drew the cord releasing her Royal Standard or personal flag, while Kekaʻaniau released the Hawaiian flag covering the tablet.

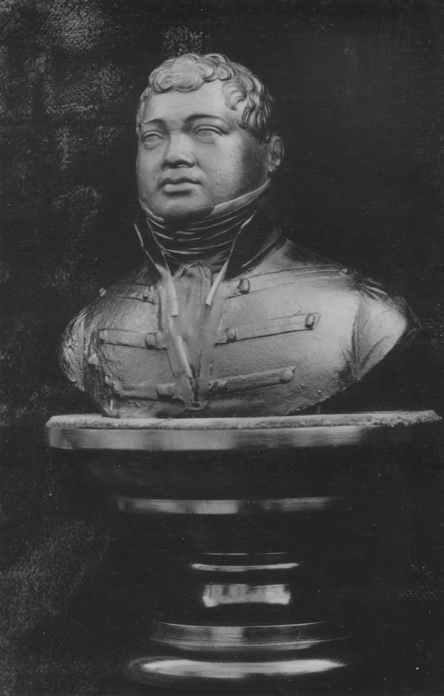
Bust of Kamehameha II, donated to the Bishop Museum by Kekaʻaniau in 1897

In 1897, Kekaʻaniau donated to the Bishop Museum the bust figure of Kamehameha II that was given by the British monarch, King George IV, when Kamehameha II died while on his state visit in London with his queen Kamāmalu in 1825. The British crown bought the lavish coffins and made the bust according to the English royal traditions during funeral services. She also donated to the Bishop Museum the following items: 2 pictures, 6 feather leis, 15 kāhili's, 5 kāhili handles, 13 ʻumeke, 5 coconut bowls and 1 Niʻihau mat. In 1996, two of her kahili's were featured in the museum exhibit in "The Legacy of Excellence, Highlights of Hawaiian Culture" and was described as being "the only ones of their kind".

Following the death of Liliʻuokalani in 1917, Kekaʻaniau became the only survivor of the Royal School. In 1920, Kekaʻaniau wrote History of Keoua Kalanikupuapa-i-nui: Father of Hawaii Kings, and His Descendants, with Notes on Kamehameha I, First King of All Hawaii, as a tribute to her great-grandfather Keōua Kalanikupuapaʻīkalaninui Ahilapalapa and his descendants. The book consisted of a genealogical history of the branches of the House of Keōua Nui including her family and the House of Kamehameha.

== Death and funeral ==
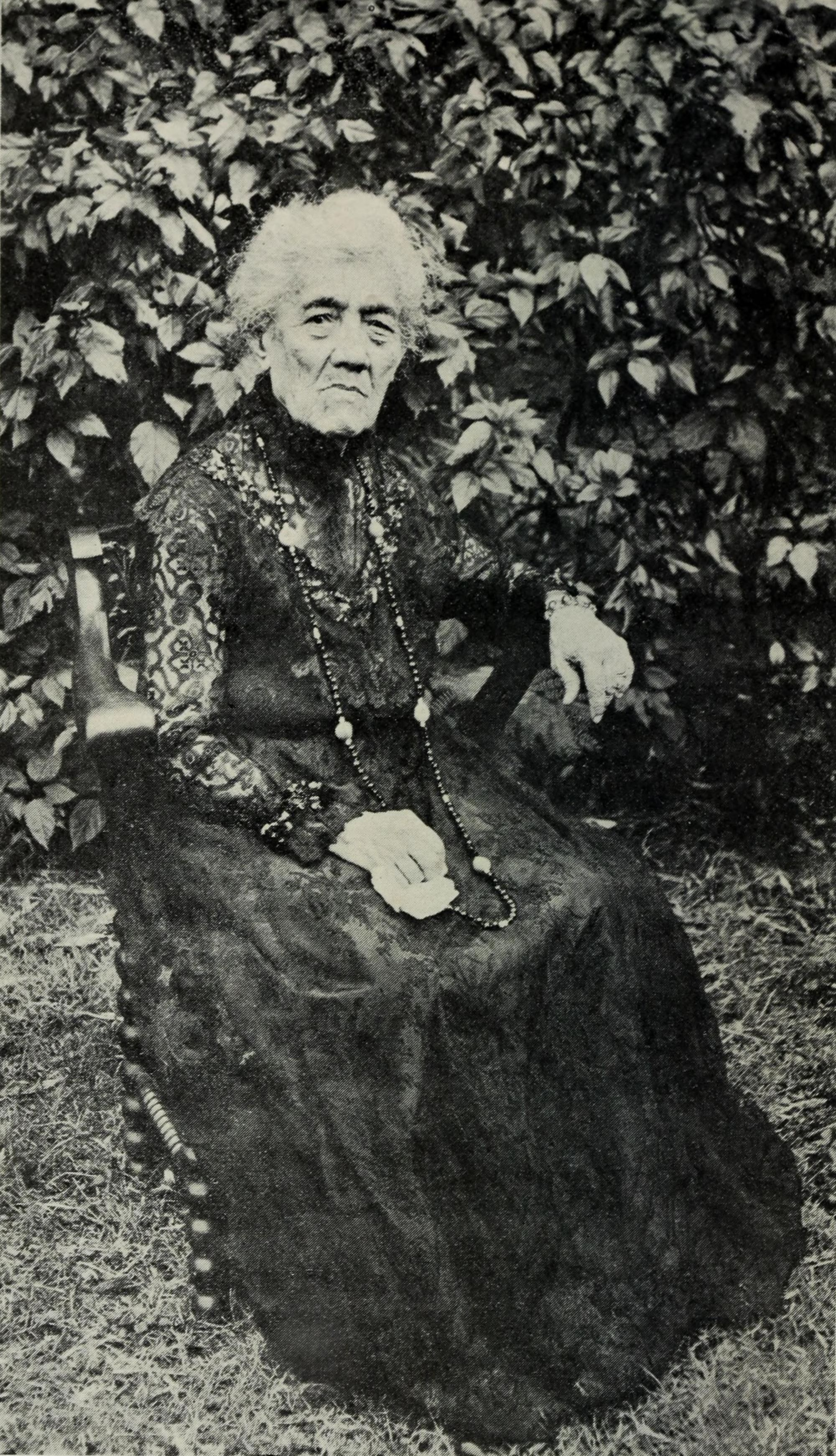
Kekaʻaniau in old age, 1920

In her later years, Kekaʻaniau lived at the home of her grandniece Eva Kuwailanimamao Cartwright Styne at 1036 Kinau Street, Makiki, Honolulu. On her 94th birthday on September 11, 1928, a large contingent of Honolulu residents made a pilgrimage to her home to bedeck the residence with floral tributes and offer expressions of affection and respect. The Honolulu Star-Bulletin noted the home of the nonagenarian "was a veritable bower of flowers, redolent with beauteous blossoms." One of her last functions, in October of the same year, was helping arrange partners for a quadrille in a historic reenactment of the court of Kamehameha IV and Queen Emma. Kekaʻaniau had been a participant in the original 1856 quadrille where she had danced with Kalākaua. After a brief illness, Kekaʻaniau died at the age of 94 at the home of her grandniece at 9am on December 20, 1928.

Although not given a state funeral, the tradition of lying in state was observed on the night before the funeral. The watches were led by members of two Hawaiian royal societies of which she had been a ranking member: the Māmakakaua (Daughters and Sons of Hawaiian Warriors) and the ʻAhahui Kaʻahumanu (Kaʻahumanu Society), of which Kekaʻaniau was the first honorary president. Princess Elizabeth Kahanu Kalanianaʻole (Moʻi of Māmakakaua) and Emma Ahuena Taylor (Kuhina Nui of Māmakakaua) led the watches.

The funeral services were conducted at Kawaiahaʻo Church by Reverend Akaiko Akana at 3:30 pm on December 23. The silver-gray coffin was draped with two ʻahuʻula, or feather cloaks, symbolizing the rank she held in the two royal societies. Territorial Governor and Mrs. Wallace Rider Farrington, former Governor and Mrs. Walter F. Frear, and former Honolulu Mayor John C. Lane joined prominent families of chiefly lineage and members of the two royal societies at the services. Lane and Colonel Curtis P. Iaukea served as two of the six pallbearers. After the simple ceremony, which only lasted half an hour, the mourners accompanied the casket to its final burial place where Akana read the burial service in Hawaiian. Per her request, Kekaʻaniau was buried with solemn ceremony next to her husband at Oʻahu Cemetery.

== Descendants and legacy ==
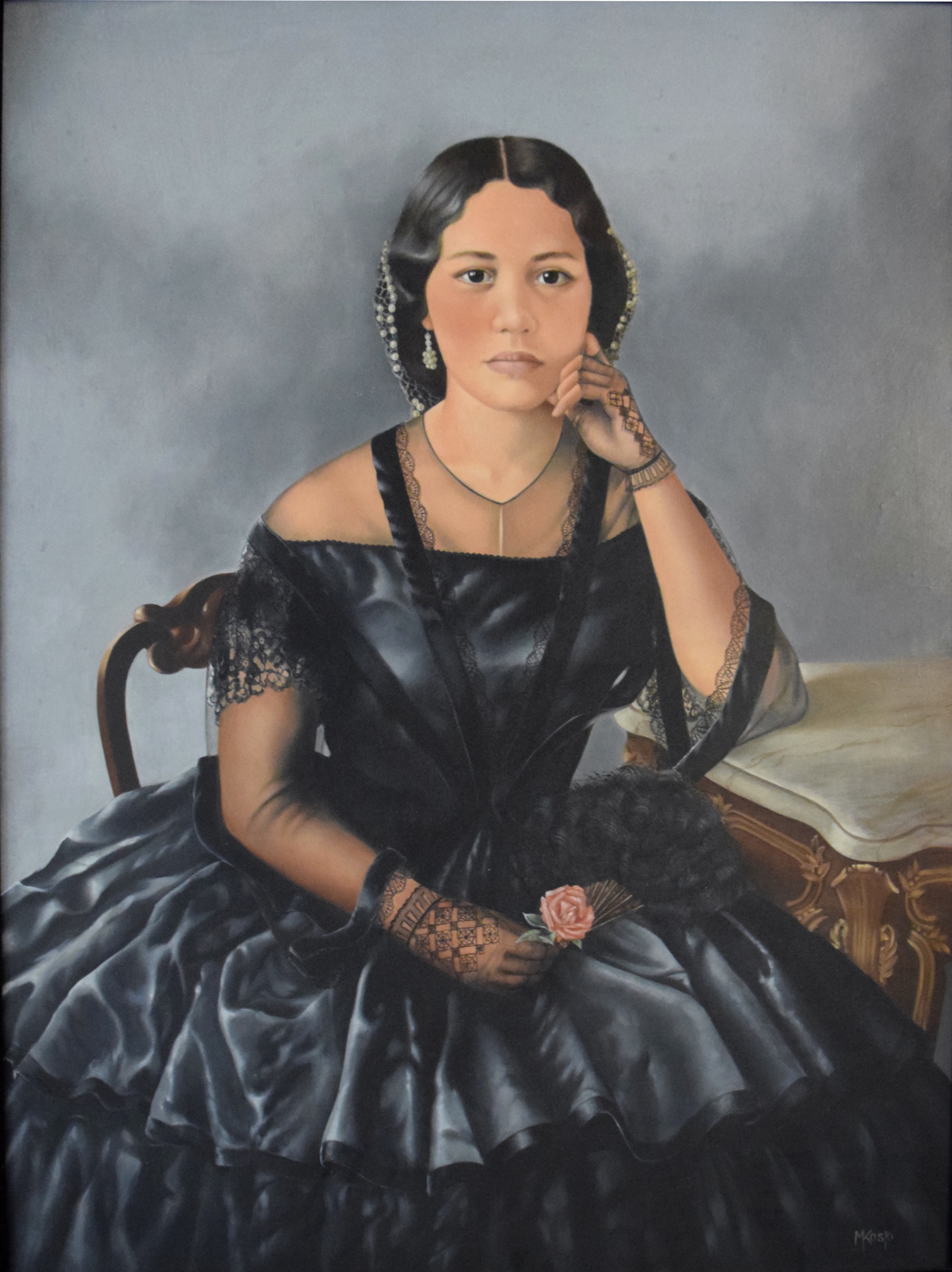
Portrait of Elizabeth Kekaʻaniau at Kawaiahaʻo Church, by Mary Koski, c. 1985

The descendants from her niece Theresa Laʻanui to Cartwright and Wilcox continue to claim to be the rightful successors of the Kamehameha line and claimant to the Hawaiian crown lands. They base their claims through Kekaʻaniau's status as the last surviving member of the Royal School chosen by Kamehameha III to be eligible for the throne of the Kingdom of Hawaii. One notable contemporary member of this family is Hawaiian musician and activist Owana Salazar, who with her son were involved with the Hawaiian activist group Ka Lāhui Hawaiʻi from 1988 to 1998.

Kekaʻaniau's 1920 book was republished in 1999 under the title Keoua: Father of Kings by her great-great-grandnephew, David Castro. It was republished again in 2009. Castro also wrote a biography of her titled Princess Elizabeth Kekaaniau Laanui: Member of the Kamehameha Dynasty, Eligible to the Hawaiian Throne in 2008.

On September 15, 1985, a portrait painted of Kekaʻaniau was unveiled at the Kawaiahaʻo Church by Helena Kalokuokamaile Wilcox (mother of Owana Salazar). The artwork was created by commissioned artist Mary Koski, who was known for her Flemish-Dutch and realistic style of painting. This painting now stands on an easel within the royal pew of Kawaiahaʻo Church, where Kekaʻaniau once sat with King Kamehameha III and other students of the Royal School. In 1989, a second painting was installed in the library of the modern day Royal Elementary School in Honolulu.

=== Family tree ===
Laʻanui, Wilcox, Salazar family tree

**Key: Subjects with bold titles and blue bold box = Aliʻi line. Bold title and grey bolded box = Lower ranking Aliʻi line. Bold title and un-bolded box = European nobility. Regular name and box = makaʻāinana or untitled foreign subject**.

**Keōua** (Note: Hawaiian Native Claims Settlement Study Commission, Exhibit B, Genealogy Descent from the Kamehameha Royal Family .)	Kahikikalaokalani	**Kekuʻiapoiwa II**
**Kalokuokamaile**	Kaloiokalani	**Kaʻahumanu**	**Kamehameha I**	**Kalākua Kaheiheimālie**
**Kaohele**	Nuhi	Jean Baptiste Rives	**Holau II**
**Makole (k)**	**Haupa (w)**	**Namahana Piia (w)**	**Gideon Peleioholani Laanui**; 1797–1849 **né Laʻanui**	**Theresa Owana Kaheiheimalie Reeves**
Captain William Slocum Wilcox; 1814–1910	**Kalua**; 1836–1865	**Gideon Kailipalaki Laanui**; 1840–1871	Elizabeth Kamaikaopa	**Elizabeth Kekaʻaniau Laʻanui Pratt**; 1834–1928 **née Elizabeth Kekaʻaniau**
**Gina Sobrero-Wilcox**; 1863-1912 (**née Baroness Gina Sobrero**)	**Robert William Kalanihiapo Wilcox** (February 15, 1855 - October 23, 1903) (Note: Historical Dictionary of the Gilded Age lists Wilcox's full birth and death dating.)	**Theresa Owana Kaʻohelelani Laʻanui**	Alexander Joy Cartwright III	Elmer Miller (Note: Marriage license of Jno K. Kilioe Miller to Virginia K. Wilcox list E.O Miller as father and Makalike as mother of Jno. (Note: "E.O.Miller". Family Search. Territory of Hawaii. Marriage license of Jno Miller to Virginia K. Wilcox - E. O. Miller in entry for Jno. K. Miller and Virginia K. Wilcox, 11 Jun 1916; citing Honolulu, Honolulu, Hawaii, reference 12495B; FHL microfilm 1,711,737))	Makalike
**Robert Kalanikupuapaikalaninui Keōua Wilcox**	Helen Kaleipuanani Simerson Wilburton	John Kilioe Miller; May 26, 1896 - April 20, 1969 (Note: United States World War I Draft Registration Cards, 1917-1918. (Note: "John K. Miller". Family Search. Territory of Hawaii.Draft card - John K Miller, 1917-1918; citing Honolulu City no 1, Hawaii, United States, NARA microfilm publication M1509 (Washington D.C.: National Archives and Records Administration, n.d.); FHL microfilm 1,452,096))	**Virginia Kahoa Kaʻahumanu Kaihikapumahana Wilcox** (Note: Hawaii Marriages, 1826-1922.)	**Elizabeth Kaʻakaualaninui Wilcox**	Daisy Emmalani Napulahaokalani Cartwright	Eva Kuwailanimamao Cartwright
Henry Mario Salazar	**Helena Kalokuokamaile Wilcox Salazar-Machado**; April 13, 1917 – September 17, 1988 (née Wilcox)	Henry Machado, Sr.
**Henry C. Keaweikekahialiiokamoku Salazar**	**Paul C. Kalokuokamaile Salazar**	**Michael Carl Kauhiokalani Salazar**	**Stephen Craig Laanui Salazar**	**Owana Kaohelelani Mahealani-Rose Salazar**

== Bibliography ==
- Bishop Museum (1907). Occasional Papers of Bernice Pauahi Bishop Museum. Vol. 2. Honolulu: Bishop Museum Press. OCLC 1204376.
- Castro, David (2008). McKain, Tiffany (ed.). Princess Elizabeth Kekaaniau Laanui: Member of the Kamehameha Dynasty, Eligible to Hawaiian the Throne. Honolulu: Ke Aliʻi Publishing. ISBN 978-0-9669586-3-8. OCLC 317452010.
- Cooke, Amos Starr; Cooke, Juliette Montague (1937). Richards, Mary Atherton (ed.). The Chiefs' Children School: A Record Compiled from the Diary and Letters of Amos Starr Cooke and Juliette Montague Cooke, by Their Granddaughter Mary Atherton Richards. Honolulu: Honolulu Star-Bulletin. OCLC 1972890.
- Craig, Robert D. (2011). Historical Dictionary of Polynesia (Third ed.). Lanham: The Scarecrow Press, Inc. ISBN 978-0-8108-6772-7. OCLC 653483731.
- Dabagh, Jean; Lyons, Curtis Jere; Hitchcock, Harvey Rexford (1974). Dabagh, Jean (ed.). "A King is Elected: One Hundred Years Ago" (PDF). The Hawaiian Journal of History. 8: 76–89. hdl:10524/112. OCLC 60626541.
- Haley, James L. (2014). Captive Paradise: A History of Hawaii. New York: St. Martin's Press. ISBN 978-0-312-60065-5.
- Hawaiian Mission Children's Society (1912). Sixteenth Annual Report of the Hawaiian Mission Children's Society. Vol. 60. Honolulu: Hawaiian Mission Children's Society. OCLC 7859883.
- Logan, Daniel, ed. (1907). A History of The Hawaiian Islands, Their Resources and People. New York: The Lewis Publishing Company.
- Kaeo, Peter; Queen Emma (1976). Korn, Alfons L. (ed.). News from Molokai, Letters Between Peter Kaeo & Queen Emma, 1873–1876. Honolulu: The University Press of Hawaii. hdl:10125/39980. ISBN 978-0-8248-0399-5. OCLC 2225064.
- Kam, Ralph Thomas (2017). Death Rites and Hawaiian Royalty: Funerary Practices in the Kamehameha and Kalakaua Dynasties, 1819–1953. S. I.: McFarland, Incorporated, Publishers. ISBN 978-1-4766-6846-8. OCLC 966566652.
- Kanahele, George S. (1999). Emma: Hawaii's Remarkable Queen. Honolulu: University of Hawaii Press. ISBN 978-0-8248-2240-8. OCLC 40890919.
- Kanahele, George S. (2002) [1986]. Pauahi: The Kamehameha Legacy. Honolulu: Kamehameha Schools Press. ISBN 978-0-87336-005-0. OCLC 173653971.
- Kaomea, Julie (2014). "Education for Elimination in Nineteenth-Century Hawaiʻi: Settler Colonialism and the Native Hawaiian Chiefs' Children's Boarding School". History of Education Quarterly. 54 (2): 123–144. doi:10.1111/hoeq.12054. ISSN 0018-2680. OCLC 5571935029. S2CID 143224034.
- Kuykendall, Ralph Simpson (1953). The Hawaiian Kingdom 1854–1874, Twenty Critical Years. Vol. 2. Honolulu: University of Hawaii Press. ISBN 978-0-87022-432-4. OCLC 47010821.
- Kuykendall, Ralph Simpson (1967). The Hawaiian Kingdom 1874–1893, The Kalakaua Dynasty. Vol. 3. Honolulu: University of Hawaii Press. ISBN 978-0-87022-433-1. OCLC 500374815.
- Krout, Mary B. (1908). The Memoirs of Bernice Pauabi Bishop. New York: The Knickerbocker Press. OCLC 4683252.
- Liliuokalani (1898). Hawaii's Story by Hawaii's Queen, Liliuokalani. Boston: Lee and Shepard. ISBN 978-0-548-22265-2. OCLC 2387226.
- McKinzie, Edith Kawelohea (1983). Stagner, Ishmael W. (ed.). Hawaiian Genealogies: Extracted from Hawaiian Language Newspapers. Vol. 1. Honolulu: University of Hawaii Press. pp. 33–38. ISBN 978-0-939154-28-9. OCLC 12555087.
- Menton, Linda K. (1981). "The Royal School 1839–1850". Educational Perspectives. The Journal of the University of Hawaii at Mānoa. 20 (3): 17–21. hdl:10125/47174. ISSN 0013-1849. OCLC 220851876.
- Nucciarone, Monica (2009). Alexander Cartwright: The Life Behind the Baseball Legend. Lincoln: University of Nebraska Press. ISBN 978-0-8032-3353-9. OCLC 268789911.
- Pratt, Elizabeth Kekaaniauokalani Kalaninuiohilaukapu (1920). History of Keoua Kalanikupuapa-i-nui: Father of Hawaii Kings, and His Descendants, with Notes on Kamehameha I, First King of All Hawaii. Honolulu: Honolulu Star-Bulletin. OCLC 154181545.
- Silva, Noenoe K. (2004). Aloha Betrayed: Native Hawaiian Resistance to American Colonialism. Durham: Duke University Press. ISBN 0-8223-8622-4. OCLC 191222123.
- Smith, Bradford (1956). Yankees In Paradise The New England Impact On Hawaii. Philadelphia: Lippincott. OCLC 1439742.
- Van Dyke, Jon M. (2008). Who Owns the Crown Lands of Hawaiʻi?. Honolulu: University of Hawaii Press. ISBN 978-0-8248-6560-3. OCLC 257449971.
- Wyllie, Robert Crichton (1845). Simmonds, P. L. (ed.). Notes on the Sandwich, Or Hawaiian Islands. London: Simmonds and Ward. pp. 125–139. OCLC 405778069.
- Yzendoorn, Reginald (1927). History of the Catholic Mission in the Hawaiian Islands. Honolulu: Honolulu Star-Bulletin. OCLC 5524024.
