= Red Bird (baseball) =

American baseball player (1890–1972)

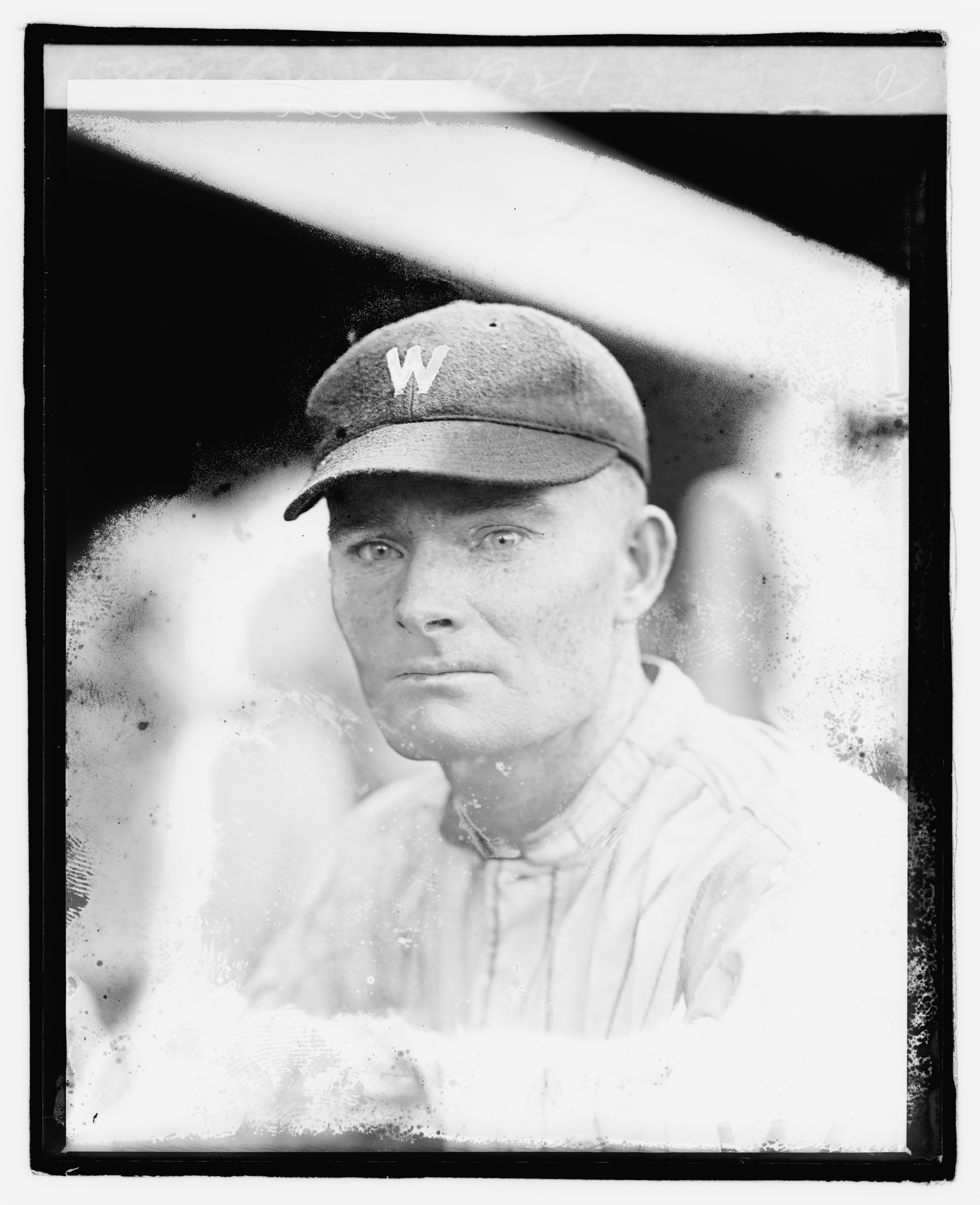
- Pitcher
- Born: April 25, 1890; Stephenville, Texas, U.S.
- Died: March 23, 1972 (aged 81); Murfreesboro, Arkansas, U.S.
- Batted: Left Threw: Left

MLB debut
- September 17, 1921, for the Washington Senators

Last MLB appearance
- September 17, 1921, for the Washington Senators

MLB statistics
- Win–loss record: 0–0
- Earned run average: 5.40
- Strikeouts: 2
- Stats at Baseball Reference

Teams
- Washington Senators (1921)

James Edward "Red" Bird (April 25, 1890 – March 23, 1972) was an American pitcher in Major League Baseball. He pitched for the Washington Senators in one game.

Bird was reportedly discovered by Senators owner Clark Griffith pitching in the Texas League for the Shreveport Gassers. He pitched in his only Major League game on September 17, 1921, against the Cleveland Indians at Griffith Stadium. He entered the game in relief of Frank Woodward and allowed three earned runs over five innings pitched.
