= Cy Twombly =

American painter, sculptor and photographer (1928–2011)

- Twombly in his studio
- Born: Edwin Parker Twombly Jr. April 25, 1928; Lexington, Virginia, U.S.
- Died: July 5, 2011 (aged 83); Rome, Italy
- Education: School of the Museum of Fine Arts; Washington and Lee University; Art Students League; Black Mountain College
- Known for: Painting, sculpture, calligraphy
- Spouse: Tatiana Franchetti (m. 1959; died 2010)
- Partner: Nicola Del Roscio (1964–2011)
- Children: 1
- Awards: Praemium Imperiale; Legion of Honor

Edwin Parker "Cy" Twombly Jr. (/ˈsaɪ ˈtwɒmbli/; April 25, 1928 – July 5, 2011) was an American painter, sculptor, and photographer.

Twombly influenced artists such as Anselm Kiefer, Francesco Clemente, Julian Schnabel, and Jean-Michel Basquiat. His best-known works are typically large-scale, freely-scribbled, calligraphic and graffiti-like works on solid fields of mostly gray, tan, or off-white colors. His later paintings and works on paper shifted toward "romantic symbolism", and their titles can be interpreted visually through shapes and forms and words. Twombly often quoted poets such as Stéphane Mallarmé, Rainer Maria Rilke, and John Keats, as well as classical myths and allegories, in his works. Examples of this are his Apollo and The Artist and a series of eight drawings consisting solely of inscriptions of the word "Virgil".

Twombly's works are in the permanent collections of modern art museums globally, including the Menil Collection in Houston, the Tate Modern in London, New York's Museum of Modern Art and Munich's Museum Brandhorst. He was commissioned for a ceiling at the Musée du Louvre in Paris.

In a 1994 retrospective, curator Kirk Varnedoe described Twombly's work as "influential among artists, discomfiting to many critics and truculently difficult not just for a broad public, but for sophisticated initiates of postwar art as well." Writing in Artforum, Travis Jeppesen went further, declaring Twombly to be "the greatest American painter of the twentieth century, and the greatest painter after Picasso, period."

== Life and career ==
Twombly was born in Lexington, Virginia, on April 25, 1928. Twombly's father, also nicknamed "Cy", pitched for the Chicago White Sox. They were both nicknamed after the baseball great Cy Young, who pitched for, among others, the Cardinals, Red Sox, Indians, and Braves.

At age 12, Twombly began to take private art lessons with the Catalan modern master Pierre Daura. After graduating from Lexington High School in 1946, Twombly attended Darlington School in Rome, Georgia, and studied at the School of the Museum of Fine Arts, Boston (1948–49), and at Washington and Lee University (1949–50) in Lexington, Virginia. On a tuition scholarship from 1950 to 1951, he studied at the Art Students League of New York, where he met Robert Rauschenberg, with whom he was briefly romantically involved. Rauschenberg encouraged him to attend Black Mountain College near Asheville, North Carolina. At Black Mountain in 1951 and 1952 he studied with Franz Kline, Robert Motherwell and Ben Shahn, and met John Cage. The poet and rector of the College, Charles Olson, had a great influence on him.

Motherwell arranged Twombly's first solo exhibition, which was organized by the Samuel M. Kootz Gallery in New York in 1951. At this time his work was influenced by Kline's black-and-white gestural expressionism, as well as Paul Klee's imagery. In 1952, Twombly received a grant from the Virginia Museum of Fine Arts which enabled him to travel to North Africa, Spain, Italy, and France. He spent this journey in Africa and Europe with Robert Rauschenberg. In 1954, he served in the U.S. Army as a cryptographer in Washington, D.C., and would frequently travel to New York during periods of leave. From 1955 through 1956, he taught at the Southern Seminary and Junior College in Buena Vista, Virginia, currently known as Southern Virginia University; during the summer vacations, Twombly would travel to New York to paint in his Williams Street apartment.

In 1957, Twombly moved to Rome and made it his primary city, where he met the Italian artist Tatiana Franchetti – sister of his patron Baron Giorgio Franchetti. They were married at New York City Hall in 1959 and then bought a palazzo on the Via di Monserrato in Rome. In addition, they had a 17th-century palace in Bassano in Teverina, near Viterbo. In 2023, the palace was restored and reopened to the public as an artists' residence and an exhibition center. The first artist to be hosted was American painter Robert Nava. Twombly and Franchetti had a son, Alessandro.

Around 1961, through their mutual relationship with the artist Afro Basaldella, Twombly met the American artist Joseph Glasco in Mykonos. According to Glasco, he and Twombly "saw each other every summer in Mykonos for years ... and saw a lot of each other daily".

In 1964, Twombly met Nicola Del Roscio of Gaeta, Italy who became his longtime assistant, companion, and archivist. Twombly bought a house and rented a studio in Gaeta in the early 1990s. Twombly and Tatiana, who died in 2010, never divorced and remained friends.

In July 2011, after suffering from cancer for several years, Twombly died in Rome after a brief hospitalization. A plaque in Santa Maria in Vallicella commemorates him.

== Work ==
=== Painting ===
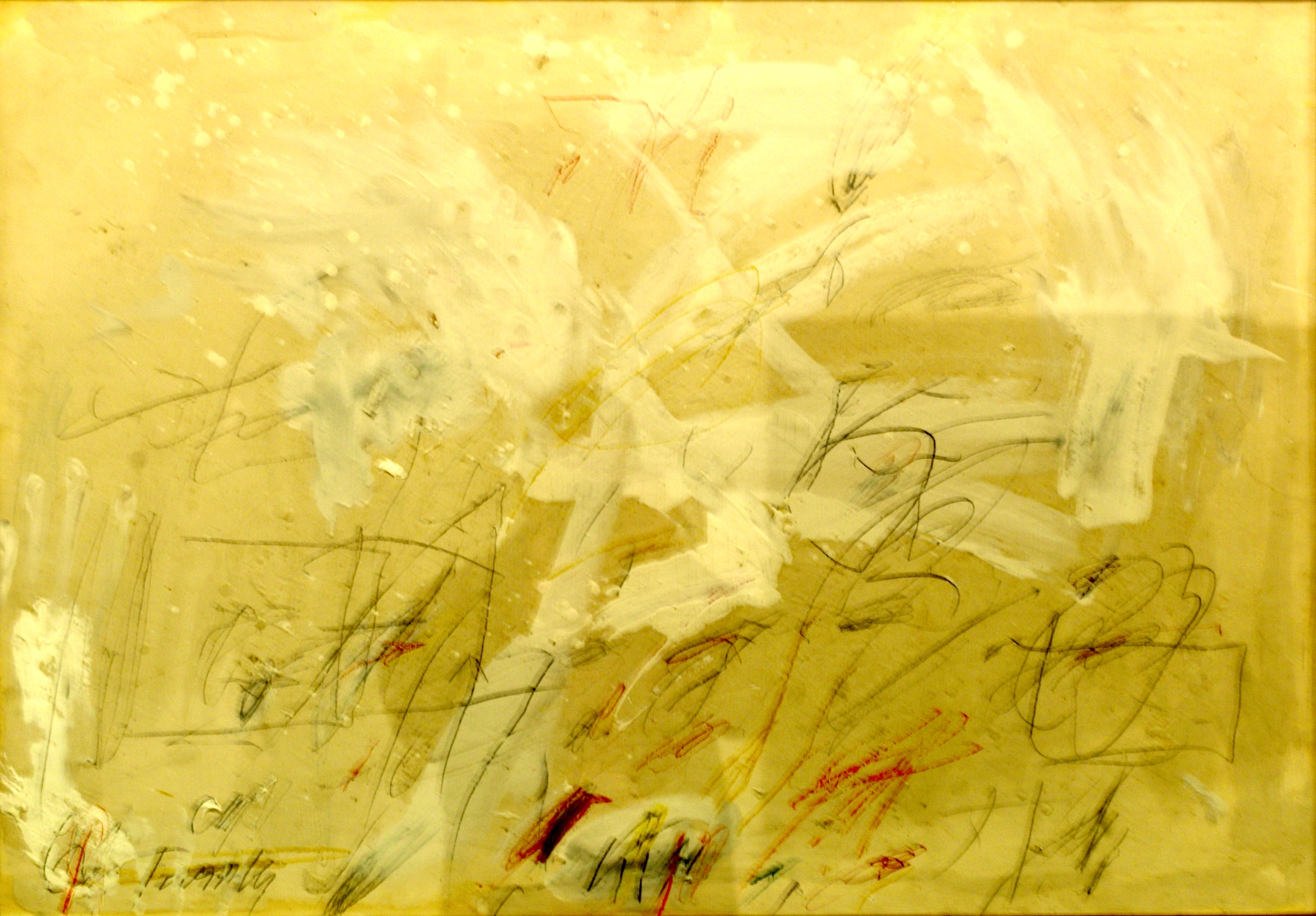
Untitled (1957)

After his return in 1953, Twombly served in the United States Army as a cryptologist, an activity that left a distinct mark on his artistic style. From 1955 to 1959, he worked in New York, where he became a prominent figure among a group of artists including Robert Rauschenberg, with whom he was sharing a studio, and Jasper Johns. Exposure to the emerging New York School purged figurative aspects from his work, encouraging a simplified form of abstraction. He became fascinated with tribal art, using the painterly language of the early 1950s to invoke primitivism, reversing the normal evolution of the New York School. Twombly soon developed a technique of gestural drawing characterized by thin white lines on a dark canvas that appear to be scratched onto the surface. He would apply bitumen on the canvas in a quick and coarse fashion, making the painting tactile and scarred with his energetic, gestural lines that would become his signature style. He stopped making sculptures in 1959 and did not take up sculpting again until 1976.

Twombly often inscribed on paintings the names of mythological figures during the 1960s. Twombly's move to Gaeta in Southern Italy in 1957 gave him closer contact with classical sources. From 1962 he produced a cycle of works based on myths including Leda and the Swan and The Birth of Venus; myths were frequent themes of Twombly's 1960s work. Between 1960 and 1963 Twombly painted the rape of Leda by the god Zeus/Jupiter in the form of a Swan six times, once in 1960, twice in 1962 and three times in 1963.

Dutch Interior (1962) at the Metropolitan Museum of Art in 2022

Twombly's 1964 exhibition of the nine-panel Discourses on Commodus (1963) at the Leo Castelli Gallery in New York was panned by artist and writer Donald Judd who said "There are a few drips and splatters and an occasional pencil line," he wrote in a review. "There isn't anything to these paintings." They are currently exhibited at the Guggenheim Bilbao.

Erotic and corporeal symbols became more prominent, whilst a greater lyricism developed in his 'Blackboard paintings'. Between 1967 and 1971, he produced a number of works on gray grounds, the 'grey paintings'. This series features terse, colorless scrawls, reminiscent of chalk on a blackboard, that form no actual words and are examples of asemic writing. Twombly made this work using an unusual technique: he sat on the shoulders of a friend, who shuttled back and forth along the length of the canvas, thus allowing the artist to create his fluid, continuous lines.

Untitled (Bolsena) (1969) at the National Gallery of Art in 2022

His later sculptures exhibit a similar blend of emotional expansiveness and intellectual sophistication. From 1976, Twombly again produced sculptures, lightly painted in white, suggestive of Classical forms. In an interview with critic David Sylvester, on the occasion of the large exhibition of his sculpture at Kunstmuseum Basel in 2000, Twombly revealed that, for him, the demands of making sculpture were distinctly different from those required of painting. "[Sculpture is] a whole other state. And it's a building thing. Whereas the painting is more fusing—fusing of ideas, fusing of feelings, fusing projected on atmosphere."

In the mid-1970s, in paintings such as Untitled (1976), Twombly began to evoke landscape through colour (favouring brown, green and light blue), written inscriptions and collage elements. In 1978 he worked on the monumental historical ensemble Fifty Days at Iliam, a ten-part cycle inspired by Homer's Iliad, specifically Alexander Pope's 1720 translation of the poem, with which Twombly was "fixated ... in an almost fanatical way", according to his long-time assistant Nicola del Roscio. Since then Twombly continued to draw on literature and myth, deploying cryptic pictorial metaphors that situate individual experience within the grand narratives of Western tradition, as in the Gaeta canvases and the monumental Four Seasons concluded in 1994.

Fifty Days at Iliam: Shield of Achilles (1978) at the Philadelphia Museum of Art in 2022

In an essay in the catalogue to the 2011 Dulwich exhibition (see below), Katharina Schmidt summarizes the scope and technique of Twombly's œuvre:

Cy Twombly's work can be understood as one vast engagement with cultural memory. His paintings, drawings and sculptures on mythological subjects have come to form a significant part of that memory. Usually drawing on the most familiar gods and heroes, he restricts himself to just a few, relatively well-known episodes, as narrated by poet-historians, given visible shape by artists and repeatedly reinterpreted in the literature and visual art of later centuries ... His special medium is writing. Starting out from purely graphic marks, he developed a kind of meta-script in which abbreviated signs, hatchings, loops, numbers and the simplest of pictographs spread throughout the picture plane in a process of incessant movement, repeatedly subverted by erasures. Eventually, this metamorphosed into script itself.

However, in a 1994 article Kirk Varnedoe thought it necessary to defend Twombly's seemingly random marks and splashes of paint against the criticism that "This is just scribbles – my kid could do it".

One could say that any child could make a drawing like Twombly only in the sense that any fool with a hammer could fragment sculptures as Rodin did, or any house painter could spatter paint as well as Pollock. In none of these cases would it be true. In each case the art lies not so much in the finesse of the individual mark, but in the orchestration of a previously uncodified set of personal "rules" about where to act and where not, how far to go and when to stop, in such a way as the cumulative courtship of seeming chaos defines an original, hybrid kind of order, which in turn illuminates a complex sense of human experience not voiced or left marginal in previous art.

Together with Rauschenberg and Jasper Johns, Twombly is regarded as the most important representative of a generation of artists who distanced themselves from abstract expressionism.

=== Works in edition ===
Although Twombly is most known for his paintings, he was also an accomplished printmaker. Twombly explored the particular characteristics and processes of each print medium when making his works in edition. Twombly's printmaking activity occurred primarily from the late 1960s to the late 1970s. During this period, Twombly worked in nearly all traditional printmaking techniques, including line etching, mezzotint, aquatint, lithography, screenprinting and collotype. Many of his editions were issued as portfolios.

== Exhibitions ==
After having an art piece being shown at Stable Gallery from 1953 to 1957, Twombly moved to Leo Castelli Gallery and later exhibited with Gagosian Gallery. Gagosian Gallery opened a new gallery in Rome, Twombly's hometown, on December 15, 2007, with the inaugural exhibition, of Twombly's work, Three Notes from Salalah.

In 1993, at Matthew Marks Gallery in New York, an exhibition of Twombly's photographs offered a selection of large blurry color images of tulips, trees and ancient busts, based on the artist's Polaroids. In 2008, a specially curated selection of Twombly's photographic work was exhibited in Huis Marseille, the Museum for Photography, Amsterdam; the exhibition was opened by Sally Mann. For the season 2010/2011 in the Vienna State Opera Cy Twombly designed the large scale picture (176 sqm) Bacchus as part of the exhibition series Safety Curtain, conceived by museum in progress. In 2011, the Museum Brandhorst, mounted a retrospective of Twombly's photographs from 1951 to 2010. It later was passed over to the Museum für Gegenwartskunst at Siegen and the Palais des Beaux Arts, Brussels.

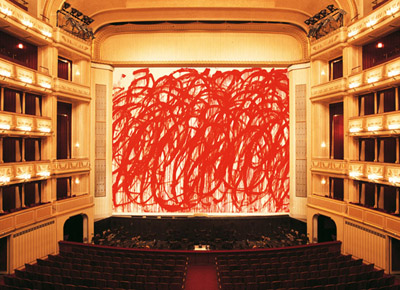
Bacchus – Iron curtain of the Vienna State Opera

Twombly's work went on display as part of Twombly and Poussin: Arcadian Painters at the Dulwich Picture Gallery in London from June 29, 2011, less than a week before his death. The show was built on a quote by Twombly stating that "I would've liked to have been Poussin, if I'd had a choice, in another time" and is the first time that his work was put in an exhibition with Poussin. Opening in conjunction with the museum's Modern Wing, Twombly's solo exhibition—Cy Twombly: The Natural World, Selected Works 2000–2007—was on display at the Art Institute of Chicago in 2009. The Last Paintings, Twombly's most recent solo exhibition, began in Los Angeles in early 2012. Following the Hong Kong exhibition, it traveled to Gagosian Gallery locations in London and New York throughout 2012. The eight untitled paintings are closely related to the Camino Real group that inaugurated Gagosian Paris in 2010.

Five Friends: John Cage, Merce Cunningham, Jasper Johns, Robert Rauschenberg, Cy Twombly was an exhibition focused on their friendship and collaboration in different artistic genres. The exhibit was a collaboration between Museum Brandhorst and Museum Ludwig; it was displayed at the Museum Brandhorst 10 April – 17 August 2025 and Museum Ludwig October 3, 2025-January 11, 2026. The catalog was published in both English and German. ISBN 978-3-8296-1043-8

=== Retrospectives ===
In 1968, the Milwaukee Art Museum mounted the first retrospective of his art. Twombly had his next retrospective at the Whitney Museum of American Art in 1979, curated by David Whitney. The artist was later honored by retrospectives at the Kunsthaus Zürich in 1987 (curated by Harald Szeemann), the Musée National d'Art Moderne, Paris, in 1988, and the Museum of Modern Art, New York, in 1994, with additional venues in Houston, Los Angeles, and Berlin. In 2001, the Menil Collection, the Kunstmuseum Basel, and the National Gallery of Art presented the first exhibition devoted entirely to Twombly's sculpture, assembling sixty-six works created from 1946 to 1998. The European retrospective Cy Twombly: Cycles and Seasons opened at the Tate Modern, London, in June 2008, with subsequent versions at the Guggenheim Museum Bilbao and the Galleria Nazionale d'Arte Moderna in Rome in 2009. At the Tate Modern retrospective, a text read:

This was his first solo retrospective in fifteen years, and provides an overview of his work from the 1950s to now. ... At the heart of the exhibition is Twombly's work exploring the cycles associated with seasons, nature and the passing of time. Several key groups are brought together for the first time, such as Tate's Four Seasons (1993–94) with those from the Museum of Modern Art, New York. The exhibition also explores how Twombly is influenced by antiquity, myth and the Mediterranean, for example the violent red swirls in the Bacchus 2005 paintings which bring to mind the drunken god of wine. The exhibition provides a unique opportunity to see the full range of Twombly's long and influential career from a fresh perspective.

Some of his work was also shown in an exhibition named Turner Monet Twombly: Later Paintings which ran from June 22 to October 28, 2012, at Tate Liverpool.

== Collections ==
In 1989, the Philadelphia Museum of Art opened permanent rooms dedicated to his monumental 10-painting cycle, Fifty Days at Iliam (1978), based on Alexander Pope's translation of The Iliad.

The Cy Twombly Pavilion of the Menil Collection in Houston, which was designed by Renzo Piano and opened in 1995, houses more than thirty of Twombly's paintings, sculptures, and works on paper, dating from 1953 to 1994. The Museum Brandhorst in Munich holds 170 works including the Lepanto series. The newly opened Broad Collection in Los Angeles holds 22 works.

In 1995, The Four Seasons entered the permanent collection of the Museum of Modern Art as a gift from the artist. A recent (1998–1999) Twombly work, Three Studies from the Temeraire, a triptych, was purchased by the Art Gallery of New South Wales for A$4.5 million in 2004. In 2010, Twombly's permanent site-specific painting, Ceiling was unveiled in the Salle des Bronzes at the Musée du Louvre. He was only the third artist to be invited to contribute in such a way (the other two were Georges Braque in the 1950s and François Morellet in 2010). In 2011, the Museum of Modern Art, New York, made a large acquisition of nine works worth about $75 million. The Bacchus series and five bronze sculptures were given by Twombly's estate to Tate Modern in 2014.

The Art Institute of Chicago hosted a two-year exhibition, "Cy Twombly: Sculpture Selections, 1948–1995". The exhibition featured examples of Twombly's sculptures made between 1948 and 1995, composed primarily of rough elements of wood coated in plaster and white paint. The Institute also holds prints, drawings, and paintings by the artist in its permanent collection.

== Recognition ==
Twombly was a recipient of a number of awards. In 1984 he was awarded the "Internationaler Preis für bildende Kunst des Landes Baden-Württemberg" and in 1987 the "Rubenspreis der Stadt Siegen". Most notably, he was awarded the Praemium Imperiale in 1996.

Twombly was invited to exhibit his work at the Venice Biennale in 1964, in 1989 and in 2001 when he was awarded the Golden Lion at the 49th Venice Biennale. In 2010 he was made Chevalier of the Légion d'Honneur by the French government. During fall 2010 Tacita Dean produced a film on Twombly, entitled Edwin Parker.

== Legacy ==
Twombly influenced artists such as Anselm Kiefer, Francesco Clemente, Julian Schnabel, and Jean-Michel Basquiat.

=== Cy Twombly Foundation ===
Twombly's will, written under U.S. law, allocated the bulk of the artist's art and cash to the Cy Twombly Foundation. The foundation now controls much of Twombly's work. It has reported $70 million in assets in 2011, and $1.5 billion in the following two years. In 2012 it purchased a 25-foot-wide Beaux Arts mansion on 19 East 82nd Street, in Upper East Side Manhattan, planning to open an education center and a small museum. There is an additional foundation office on the Gaeta property. The four board members were divided in a lawsuit, settled in March 2014.

In 2021, the Cy Twombly Foundation and the Louvre settled a dispute over an unauthorized renovation of Twombly's The Ceiling, the site-specific mural created for the Salle des Bronzes, and announced that the foundation had dropped the lawsuit in exchange for a plan to restore the gallery to the artist's original design.

== Art market ==
In 1990, a Christie's auction set a record for Twombly, with his 1971 untitled blackboard painting fetching $5.5 million. In 2011, a Twombly work from 1967, Untitled, sold for $15.2 million at Christie's in New York. A new record was made in May 2012 for the 1970 painting Untitled (New York) at Sotheby's, selling for $17.4 million (€13.4 million). In November 2013 a record price of $21.7 million for Poems to the Sea (1959), an abstract, 24-part multimedium work on paper, was achieved at Sotheby's Contemporary Art Sale.

A new price record was set at Christie's Contemporary Art Sale on November 12, 2014, an untitled 1970 painting from his Blackboard series with "lasso-like scribbles" fetched far beyond the $35 million to $55 million estimate, selling at $69.6 million (£44.3m).

In November 2015, New York City (1968) set another new price record for Twombly at $70.5 million. Per Artnet News, "Covered with his trademark looping white scribbles on a slate-gray background, the work recalls his experience as a cryptologist at the Pentagon."

== Phaedrus incident ==
In 2007, an exhibition of Twombly's paintings, Blooming, a Scattering of Blossoms and Other Things, and other works on paper from gallerist Yvon Lambert's collection, was displayed from June to September at the Museum of Contemporary Art in Avignon. On July 19, 2007, police arrested Cambodian-French artist Rindy Sam after she kissed one panel of Twombly's triptych Phaedrus. The panel, an all-white canvas, was smudged by Sam's red lipstick and she was tried in a court in Avignon for "voluntary degradation of a work of art".

Sam defended her gesture to the court: "J'ai fait juste un bisou. C'est un geste d'amour, quand je l'ai embrassé, je n'ai pas réfléchi, je pensais que l'artiste, il aurait compris ... Ce geste était un acte artistique provoqué par le pouvoir de l'art" ("It was just a kiss, a loving gesture. I kissed it without thinking; I thought the artist would understand .... It was an artistic act provoked by the power of art").

The prosecution described the act as a "sort of cannibalism, or parasitism", but admitted that Sam was "visibly not conscious of what she has done", asking that she be fined €4,500 and compelled to attend a citizenship class. The art work was worth an estimated $2 million. In November 2007, Sam was convicted and ordered to pay €1,000 to the painting's owner, €500 to the Avignon gallery where it was exhibited, and a symbolic €1 to the painter.

== General sources ==
- The Art Institute of Chicago Retrieved May 7, 2015
- Cy Twombly: Cycles and Seasons. Edited by Nicholas Serota. London: Tate Publishing and Distributed Art Publishers, 2008.
- Twombly and Poussin: Arcadian Painters Dulwich Picture Gallery June 29 – September 25, 2011.
