= Mitch Harris (baseball) =

American baseball player (born 1985)

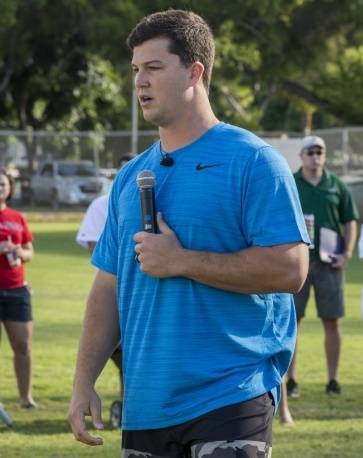
- Harris at Pearl Harbor in 2015
- Pitcher
- Born: November 7, 1985 (age 40); Ocala, Florida, U.S.
- Batted: Right Threw: Right

MLB debut
- April 25, 2015, for the St. Louis Cardinals

Last MLB appearance
- September 30, 2015, for the St. Louis Cardinals

MLB statistics
- Win–loss record: 2–1
- Earned run average: 3.67
- Strikeouts: 15
- Stats at Baseball Reference

Teams
- St. Louis Cardinals (2015)

Mitch Harris
- Born: November 7, 1985 (age 40); Ocala, Florida
- Military career
- Allegiance: United States of America
- Branch: United States Navy
- Service years: 2008–2013
- Rank: Lieutenant

Mitchell Andrew Harris (born November 7, 1985) is an American former professional baseball pitcher. He played in Major League Baseball (MLB) for the St. Louis Cardinals in 2015. A native of Florida who grew up in North Carolina, Harris attended the United States Naval Academy. After serving as a Lieutenant in the Navy, Harris became the first Naval Academy graduate to appear in the major leagues since 1921, and just the second ever to do so.

== Early life ==
Mitch Harris was born in Ocala, Florida, the son of Cy and Cindy Harris, and grew up in Mount Holly, North Carolina. He attended South Point High School in Belmont, North Carolina, where he played trombone and lettered in baseball and was all-conference and all-state in 2003 and 2004.

At first, very few scouts watched Harris pitch in high school. Having weighed 175 pounds (79 kg) at one point, he was much less imposing than his weight of 240 pounds (110 kg) on his Major League Baseball (MLB) debut. However, the more he pitched, the more he drew notice. After attracting more scouts over time, they eventually rated him as one of the top collegiate pitching prospects.

== College baseball career (2005–08) ==
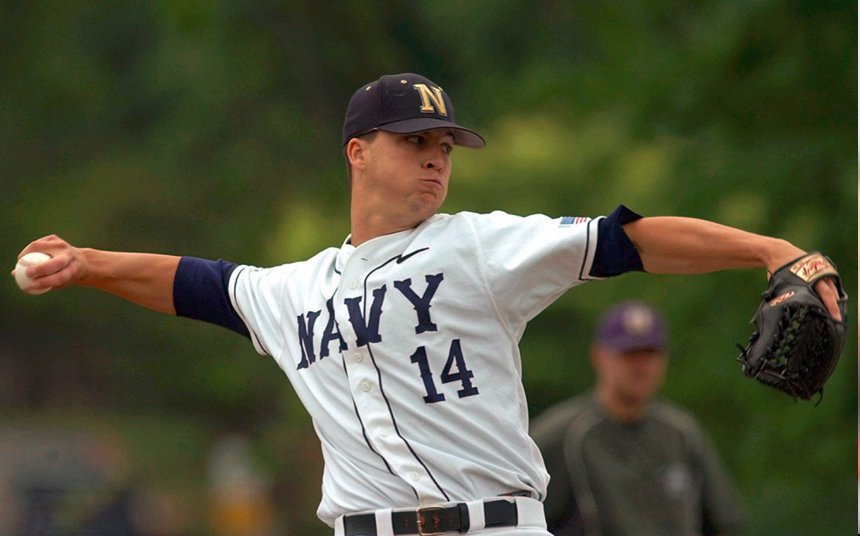
Harris playing baseball with the Navy team.

Harris attended college at the United States Naval Academy, majoring in general engineering, and playing college baseball as a pitcher and infielder for the Midshipmen. Having ended up at the Academy by chance, a Navy football recruiter named Buddy Green watched him pitch a bullpen session in high school. Green found out that Harris was not interested in football, but was open to attending the Naval Academy, so he made phone calls on his behalf. In spite of the path that led to his entrance into Navy, Harris spent his freshman year as a corner infielder and utility player.

However, when incoming coach Paul Kostacopoulos watched Harris throw during a practice session after his freshman season, he asked him to pitch in the bullpen, where he reached 91 miles per hour (146 km/h). Impressed with the tryout, Kostacopoulos expanded Harris' role to pitching. As a sophomore, he claimed the Patriot League pitching triple crown with a 10–3 record, 1.74 earned run average (ERA) and 113 strikeouts (SO) in 13 games started. He also hit one home run with 27 runs batted in (RBI) and a .333 batting average.

The next season, as a junior, Harris went 8–5 with a 2.14 ERA and a Patriot League-record 119 strikeouts. He also emerged as a force on offense, with a league-leading eight home runs, 47 RBI and a .293 average. He also led Navy in runs batted in, doubles (10), triples (four) and slugging percentage (.534). Baseball America named Harris a third-team All-American. One of his teammates at Navy, Oliver Drake, also a pitcher, was a selection in the same amateur draft, and made his major league debut for the Baltimore Orioles the month following Harris. Harris' college pitching career totals included a record of 20–13 with a 2.51 ERA and 291 strikeouts over 222 1/3 innings. At the plate, he batted .295 with 105 runs scored, 16 home runs and 112 RBI.

In 2007, he played collegiate summer baseball in the Cape Cod Baseball League for the Bourne Braves. When he graduated, he was one of the highest-rated pitching prospects for the amateur draft, with a fastball that could reach 95 miles per hour (153 km/h) and a cutter with the ability to break bats.

== U.S. Naval service (2008–13) ==
Following graduation in 2008 from the Naval Academy, Harris served in the United States Navy for four years, eight months and eight days, attaining the rank of Lieutenant (LT). He was based in Norfolk, Virginia, and deployed a total of three times. One was to the Persian Gulf on the USS Ponce, a 577 feet (176 m) amphibious transport dock, where he served as a weapons officer. LT Harris then contributed to a diplomatic mission to Russia on the USS Carr, an Oliver Hazard Perry-class frigate, and to South America for anti-drug operations. He also went to the Baltic states and served as a combat information officer and a training officer. In his time in the military, he visited more than 30 countries. In 2007, he played collegiate summer baseball in the Cape Cod Baseball League for the Bourne Braves.

While aboard ship, Harris played catch whenever he could to keep his pitching skills as well-tuned as possible. He always took his glove, and his father sent bags of balls to him, as they often skipped overboard. His throwing partner was a cook from the Dominican Republic.

Both of Harris' grandfathers served in the United States military during World War II. Also a member of the Navy, Louin Harris fought in the Battle of Midway. Serving in the Army, James Chamberlain fought in the Battle of the Bulge.

== Professional baseball career (2013–2017) ==
The Atlanta Braves selected Harris in the 24th round of the 2007 Major League Baseball draft, but he did not sign. He was then drafted by the St. Louis Cardinals in the 13th round of the 2008 MLB draft. He signed with the Cardinals but was unable to play until 2013 due to his commitment to the Navy. He twice petitioned for early release from active duty Navy to the reserves to commence his professional baseball career, in the manner of NBA legend David Robinson. However, the Navy denied Harris' request both times, citing the contemporaneous war in Afghanistan as the reason. John Abbamondi, a former Naval flight officer and the Cardinals' assistant general manager while Harris was in the Navy, wrote letters on his behalf for the early release.

=== First professional season: State College (2013) ===
After his five years in service ended in 2013, Harris started his professional baseball career in the Cardinals' minor league system, making his debut with the State College Spikes of the New York–Penn League. After his absence from competition, Harris' fastball velocity had dipped to the low 80s miles per hour. However, the velocity eventually returned to the level of his college playing time. He played for State College exclusively in 2013, appearing in 20 games and going 4–1 with a 0.81 ERA and 29 SO in 33 1/3 IP.

=== Palm Beach, Springfield and Memphis (2014) ===
Harris started 2014 with the Palm Beach Cardinals of the High-A Florida State League. After eight games, St. Louis promoted him to the Double-A Springfield Cardinals. Harris made his final regular season appearance with the Triple-A Memphis Redbirds. Overall, he had a 3.92 ERA in 57 1/3 innings. After the season, he competed with Peoria Javelinas in the Arizona Fall League, an off-season showcase of major league prospects, where he was the oldest player by three years.

=== St. Louis Cardinals (2015–2017) ===
Reassigned to Memphis to start the 2015 season, the Cardinals called Harris up on April 21. He became the first Naval Academy alumnus in Major League Baseball since Nemo Gaines in 1921, and just the second ever. Harris made his big-league pitching debut at Miller Park in Milwaukee against the Brewers on Saturday, April 25, in relief of starter Adam Wainwright, who had injured himself as he ran to first base on a pop out while batting. Harris entered the game in the bottom of the fifth inning, and struck out the first batter he faced, Adam Lind. Harris pitched 1 1/3 innings, allowing no runs in the Cardinals' 5–3 win.

On May 5, Harris recorded his first MLB win after pitching a scoreless sixth inning in the Cardinals' 7–4 victory over the Chicago Cubs. Through his first seven appearances and 7 2/3 innings pitched, he did not allow a run, until May 10 against the Pittsburgh Pirates. On June 19, after appearing in 16 games with a 1–1 record and a 3.63 ERA, the Cardinals optioned him back to Memphis. Harris appeared in five more games and 5 1/3 IP at Memphis, allowing three runs on seven hits, before a July 4 recall to the major league club. One week later, the Cardinals placed him on the 15-day DL with a groin strain. He appeared in 26 games, all in relief, finished with a 2–1 record, 3.67 ERA and 13 walks while striking out 15 in 27 innings. After the season, he received the Tony Conigliaro Award, accorded to a player who "has overcome adversity through the attributes of spirit, determination and courage that were trademarks of Tony C.," per former Boston Red Sox historian Dick Bresciani.

An arm soreness delaying Harris' spring training preparation, the Cardinals placed him on the disabled list prior to the start of the 2016 season due to nerve compression syndrome. He underwent surgery in June and missed the remainder of the season. Harris sought second and third opinions and instead of the expected "Tommy John surgery", he had “primary repair,” or “UCL repair with internal brace construction,” which may have a shorter recovery time and hoped to pitch in 2017. He was released on May 9, 2017.

== See also ==
St. Louis Cardinals all-time roster
