= Elmer Leifer =

American baseball player (1893–1948)

- Pinch hitter
- Born: May 23, 1893; Clarington, Ohio, U.S.
- Died: September 26, 1948 (aged 55); Everett, Washington, U.S.
- Batted: Left Threw: Right

MLB debut
- September 7, 1921, for the Chicago White Sox

Last MLB appearance
- September 26, 1921, for the Chicago White Sox

MLB statistics
- Games played: 9
- At bats: 10
- Hits: 3
- Stats at Baseball Reference

Teams
- Chicago White Sox (1921)

Elmer Edwin Leifer (May 23, 1893 – September 26, 1948) was an American pinch hitter in Major League Baseball. He played for the Chicago White Sox in 1921.

In 1922, while playing for the Little Rock Travelers of the Class-A Southern Association, Leifer was injured in a collision with teammate Travis Jackson, ending Leifer's playing career. Leifer continued to suffer from the effects of the collision in his later life. Leifer committed suicide by swallowing an overdose of Nembutal.
