= Nemo Gaines =

American baseball player (1897-1979)

- Pitcher
- Born: December 23, 1897; Alexandria, Virginia
- Died: January 26, 1979 (aged 81); Warrenton, Virginia
- Batted: Left Threw: Left

MLB debut
- June 26, 1921, for the Washington Senators

Last MLB appearance
- July 16, 1921, for the Washington Senators

MLB statistics
- Win–loss record: 0–0
- Earned run average: 0.00
- Strikeouts: 1
- Stats at Baseball Reference

Teams
- Washington Senators (1921)

Willard Roland "Nemo" Gaines (December 23, 1897 – January 26, 1979) was an American military officer and baseball player. He served as an officer in the United States Navy and played briefly as a Major League Baseball (MLB) pitcher with the Washington Senators.

== Biography ==
Gaines was born on December 23, 1897, in Alexandria, Virginia. He attended the United States Naval Academy. He pitched for the Navy Midshipmen baseball team, lettering from 1919 through 1921. He graduated from the Naval Academy in 1921.

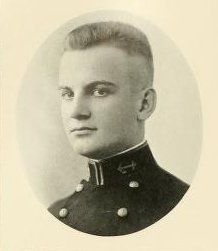
Photo of Gaines in the 1921 US Naval Academy yearbook.

After graduating, he received a special leave from the Navy to pitch for the Washington Senators of Major League Baseball (MLB). In his MLB debut, he relieved George Mogridge in a game against the New York Yankees, facing Bob Meusel, Wally Pipp, Aaron Ward and Wally Schang. On July 2, he pitched 1 2/3 innings against the Philadelphia Athletics. He pitched another inning against the Athletics the next day. His final appearance came on July 16 against the Cleveland Indians. In total, Gaines appeared in four games for the Senators between June 26 and July 16, 1921, pitching 4 2/3 innings while giving up five hits, two walks and no runs. The Senators lost all four games he appeared in. Gaines was the only Navy Midshipman to play in MLB until Mitch Harris made his big league debut with the St. Louis Cardinals in 2015.

Gaines returned to the Navy after his brief stint in MLB. He served as an officer, reaching the rank of captain. During World War II, Gaines served as U.S. naval attaché, stationed in Peru. He retired in 1946 to Virginia, where he raised Hereford cattle and opened a hardware store with his brother. He was a senior warden in the Episcopal Church at the time of his death.

Gaines died on January 26, 1979, in Warrenton, Virginia, and was interred in Arlington National Cemetery.
