= Bing Miller =

American baseball player and coach (1894–1966)

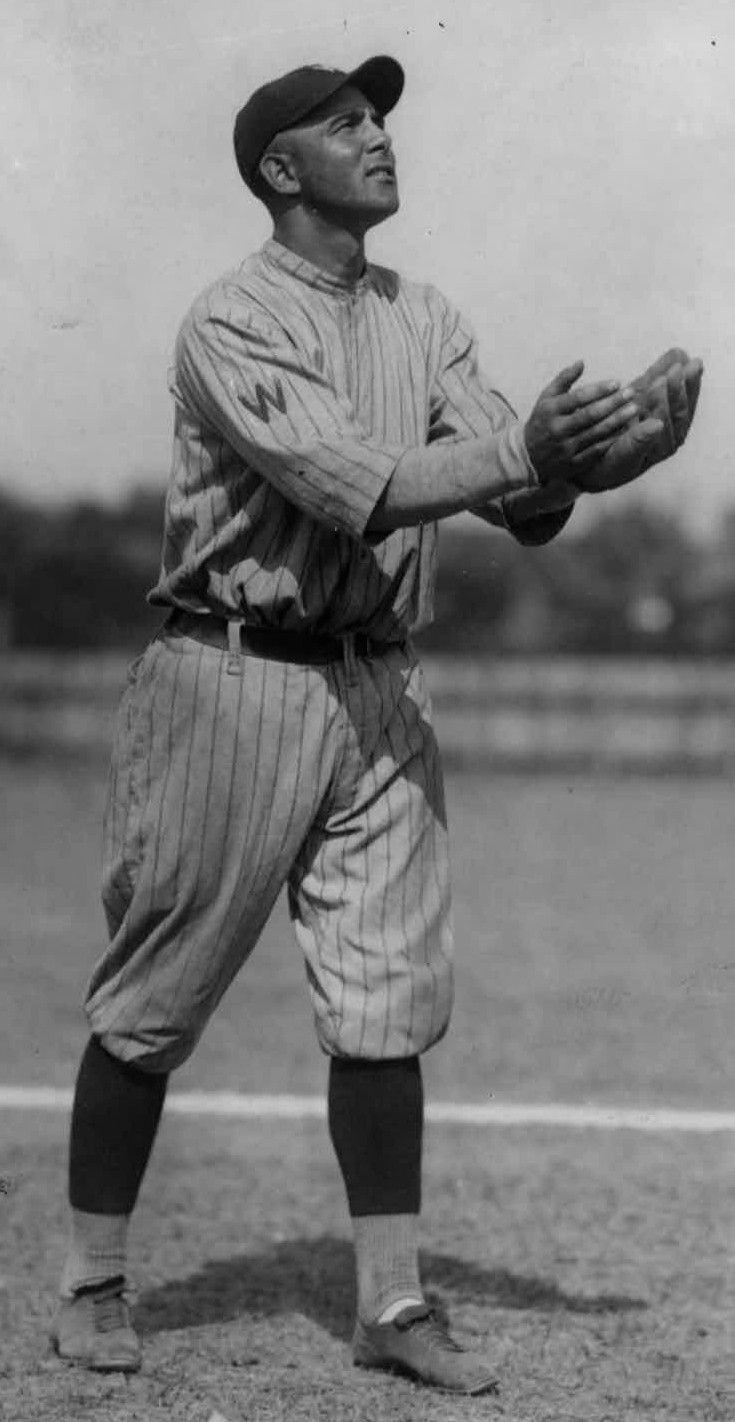
- Outfielder
- Born: August 30, 1894; Vinton, Iowa, U.S.
- Died: May 7, 1966 (aged 71); Philadelphia, Pennsylvania, U.S.
- Batted: Right Threw: Right

MLB debut
- April 16, 1921, for the Washington Senators

Last MLB appearance
- September 5, 1936, for the Boston Red Sox

MLB statistics
- Batting average: .311
- Home runs: 116
- Runs batted in: 993
- Stats at Baseball Reference

Teams
- Washington Senators (1921); Philadelphia Athletics (1922–1926); St. Louis Browns (1926–1927); Philadelphia Athletics (1928–1934); Boston Red Sox (1935–1936)

Career highlights and awards
- 2× World Series champion (1929, 1930); Philadelphia Baseball Wall of Fame

Edmund John "Bing" Miller (August 30, 1894 – May 7, 1966) was an American professional baseball player and coach. He played in Major League Baseball as an outfielder from 1922 to 1936, most prominently as a member of the Philadelphia Athletics dynasty that won three consecutive American League pennants from 1929 to 1931 and won the World Series in 1929 and 1930. He also played for the Washington Senators, St. Louis Browns and the Boston Red Sox and posted a .311 career batting average.

After his playing career, Miller worked for 17 years as a coach for several major-league organizations.

== Baseball career ==
Born in Vinton, Iowa, Miller debuted in the major leagues on April 16, 1921, at the age of 26 with the Washington Senators, but in 1922 Miller was traded to the Philadelphia Athletics.

Miller was the starting right fielder for the Athletics during their three consecutive American League championships and, was part of one of the most feared batting orders in the history of baseball featuring three future Baseball Hall of Fame members (Al Simmons, Jimmie Foxx, and Mickey Cochrane).

In 1929, he hit for a .331 batting average with 93 runs batted in and a career-high .380 on-base percentage to help the Athletics win their first American League pennant in 15 years by 18 games over the vaunted New York Yankees of Babe Ruth and Lou Gehrig. He was one of six Athletics players to post batting averages above .310 during the 1929 season. He went on to produce a .368 batting average in the 1929 World Series including a two-out walk-off double in the bottom of the ninth inning in Game 5 to clinch the World Series championship for the Athletics over the Chicago Cubs.

In 1930 Miller hit for a .303 batting average with 9 home runs and a career-high 100 runs batted in as the Athletics repeated as American League champions and defeated the St. Louis Cardinals in the 1930 World Series. The Athletics won their third consecutive American League championship in 1931 but, were defeated by the Pepper Martin-led St. Louis Cardinals in the World Series.

Miller's offensive output began to diminish at the same time that owner Connie Mack began to dismantle the team. The Great Depression was well under way, and declining attendance had drastically reduced the Athletic's revenues. Mack sold or traded his best players in order to reduce expenses and, by 1934 the team had fallen to fifth place.

On January 14, 1935, Miller was released by the Athletics and the following day signed as a free agent with the Boston Red Sox. He played in his final Major League game on September 5, 1936 at the age of 42. He was released by the Red Sox on September 27, 1936.

== Career statistics ==
In a sixteen-year major league career, Miller played in 1,820 games, accumulating 1,934 hits in 6,212 at bats for a .311 career batting average, along with 946 runs, 389 doubles, 96 triples, 116 home runs, 993 runs batted in, 127 stolen bases, 383 bases on balls, .359 on-base percentage and .461 slugging percentage. He batted .258 with 17 hits in 18 World Series games from 1929–1931. Miller recorded a career .972 fielding percentage playing at all three outfield positions and first base.

== Later life ==
Miller was a coach in the American League for 17 years after his playing career ended, working with the Red Sox (1937), Detroit Tigers (1938–1941), Chicago White Sox (1942–1949) and Athletics (1950–1953).

On May 7, 1966, Miller was injured in an auto accident while driving home after attending a game at Connie Mack Stadium between the Phillies and Pirates. Taken to Presbyterian Hospital in Philadelphia, he died six hours after the accident.

His younger brother Ralph Miller played in one Major League game for the Washington Senators in 1921.
