= Fred Bratschi =

American baseball player (1892–1962)

- Outfielder
- Born: January 16, 1892; Alliance, Ohio, U.S.
- Died: January 10, 1962 (aged 69); Massillon, Ohio, U.S.
- Batted: Right Threw: Right

MLB debut
- July 24, 1921, for the Chicago White Sox

Last MLB appearance
- April 12, 1927, for the Boston Red Sox

MLB statistics
- Batting average: .276
- Home runs: 0
- Runs batted in: 22
- Stats at Baseball Reference

Teams
- Chicago White Sox (1921); Boston Red Sox (1926–27)

Frederick Oscar Bratschi (January 16, 1892 – January 10, 1962) was an American left fielder in Major League Baseball between 1921 and 1927. Bratschi batted and threw right-handed. He was born in Alliance, Ohio.

Bratschi was 29 years old when he reached the majors with the Chicago White Sox in 1921, spending one year with them before moving to the Boston Red Sox during 1926-27. In parts of three seasons, he posted a .276 batting average (54-for-196) with 12 runs, 19 RBI,10 doubles, and one triple with no home runs in 89 games played.

Bratschi died in Massillon, Ohio, at the age of 69, by accidentally drinking battery acid.
