= John Michaelson =

American baseball player (1893–1968)

- Pitcher
- Born: August 12, 1893; Taivalkoski, Grand Duchy of Finland
- Died: April 16, 1968 (aged 74); Woodruff, Wisconsin
- Batted: Right Threw: Right

MLB debut
- August 28, 1921, for the Chicago White Sox

Last MLB appearance
- August 30, 1921, for the Chicago White Sox

MLB statistics
- Win–loss record: 0–0
- Strikeouts: 1
- Earned run average: 10.13
- Stats at Baseball Reference

Teams
- Chicago White Sox (1921)

John August Michaelson (born Johan Aukusti Mikkola; August 12, 1893 – April 16, 1968) was an American professional baseball pitcher. He appeared in two games in 1921 for the Chicago White Sox. He is the only major league player to have been born in Finland.
