= Dominic Mulrenan =

American baseball player (1893–1964)

- Pitcher
- Born: December 18, 1893; Woburn, Massachusetts, U.S.
- Died: July 27, 1964 (aged 70); Melrose, Massachusetts, U.S.
- Batted: Right Threw: Right

MLB debut
- April 24, 1921, for the Chicago White Sox

Last MLB appearance
- August 5, 1921, for the Chicago White Sox

MLB statistics
- Win–loss record: 2–8
- Earned run average: 7.23
- Strikeouts: 10
- Stats at Baseball Reference

Teams
- Chicago White Sox (1921)

Dominic Joseph Mulrenan (December 18, 1893 – July 27, 1964) was an American pitcher in Major League Baseball. He played for the Chicago White Sox.

Mulrenan was scouted by Patsy Donovan while pitching in semi-professional leagues after having excelled as a pitcher at Woburn High School in Woburn, Massachusetts. He signed with the Boston Red Sox at 19 years old in 1914. He spent that season in the minor leagues in Syracuse, New York.

Mulrenan did not reach the major leagues until 1921 with the White Sox, whose roster was left with several vacancies after eight players were banned for life following the Black Sox scandal. In the words of Arthur Duffey, Mulrenan "had little luck" with the White Sox before being optioned to the minor league Minneapolis Millers at the end of August.

After arm injuries forced his retirement from baseball, Mulrenan became a firefighter in Melrose, Massachusetts, a position which he held until retiring four years before his death in 1964. Two of his sons became Catholic priests and another pitched collegiately at Boston College.
