= Hod Fenner =

American baseball player (1897–1954)

- Pitcher
- Born: July 12, 1897; Martin, Michigan, U.S.
- Died: November 20, 1955 (aged 58); Detroit, Michigan, U.S.
- Batted: Right Threw: Right

MLB debut
- September 9, 1921, for the Chicago White Sox

Last MLB appearance
- September 24, 1921, for the Chicago White Sox

MLB statistics
- Win–loss record: 0–0
- Earned run average: 7.71
- Strikeouts: 1
- Stats at Baseball Reference

Teams
- Chicago White Sox (1921)

Horace Alfred "Hod" Fenner (July 12, 1897 – November 20, 1954) was an American pitcher in Major League Baseball. He played for the Chicago White Sox in 1921.
