= Cy Twombly (baseball) =

American baseball player (1897–1974)

- Pitcher
- Born: June 15, 1897; Groveland, Massachusetts, U.S.
- Died: December 3, 1974 (aged 77); Savannah, Georgia, U.S.
- Batted: Right Threw: Right

MLB debut
- June 25, 1921, for the Chicago White Sox

Last MLB appearance
- August 17, 1921, for the Chicago White Sox

MLB statistics
- Win–loss record: 1–2
- Earned run average: 5.86
- Strikeouts: 7
- Stats at Baseball Reference

Teams
- Chicago White Sox (1921)

Edwin Parker "Cy" Twombly Sr. (June 15, 1897 – December 3, 1974) was an American right-handed pitcher in Major League Baseball who appeared in seven games for the 1921 Chicago White Sox. Born in Groveland, Massachusetts, he attended Lehigh University and Springfield College. He was a swim coach and later Athletic Director of Washington & Lee University in Lexington, Virginia in the late 1950s and early 1960s. His namesake son was a major American artist. He died at age 77 in Savannah, Georgia.
