= Vance McIlree =

American baseball player

- Pitcher
- Born: October 14, 1897; Riverside, Iowa
- Died: May 6, 1959 (aged 61); Kansas City, Missouri
- Batted: Right Threw: Right

MLB debut
- September 13, 1921, for the Washington Senators

Last MLB appearance
- September 13, 1921, for the Washington Senators

MLB statistics
- Games played: 1
- Innings pitched: 1
- Earned run average: 9.00
- Stats at Baseball Reference

Teams
- Washington Senators (1921)

Vance Elmer McIlree (October 14, 1897 – May 6, 1959) was a pitcher in Major League Baseball. He pitched for the Washington Senators in one game in 1921.

== Early life ==
Vance McIlree was born in Riverside, Iowa as the third son and fourth child of Elmer Addison and Myrtle Zillah (Seaton) McIllree. His father was a newspaper printer. He attended West Union High School where he played football, basketball, track and baseball. He then attended the University of Iowa, where he played baseball, and nearly pitched a perfect game in May 1920.
