= George Lees (baseball) =

American baseball player (1895–1980)

- Catcher
- Born: February 2, 1895; Bethlehem, Pennsylvania, U.S.
- Died: January 2, 1980 (aged 84); Mechanicsburg, Pennsylvania, U.S.
- Batted: Right Threw: Right

MLB debut
- May 7, 1921, for the Chicago White Sox

Last MLB appearance
- September 24, 1921, for the Chicago White Sox

MLB statistics
- Batting average: .214
- Home runs: 0
- Runs batted in: 4
- Stats at Baseball Reference

Teams
- Chicago White Sox (1921)

George Edward Lees (February 2, 1895 – January 2, 1980) was an American Major League Baseball catcher who played for the Chicago White Sox in 1921.
