= Ralph Miller (left-handed pitcher) =

American baseball player (1899-1967)

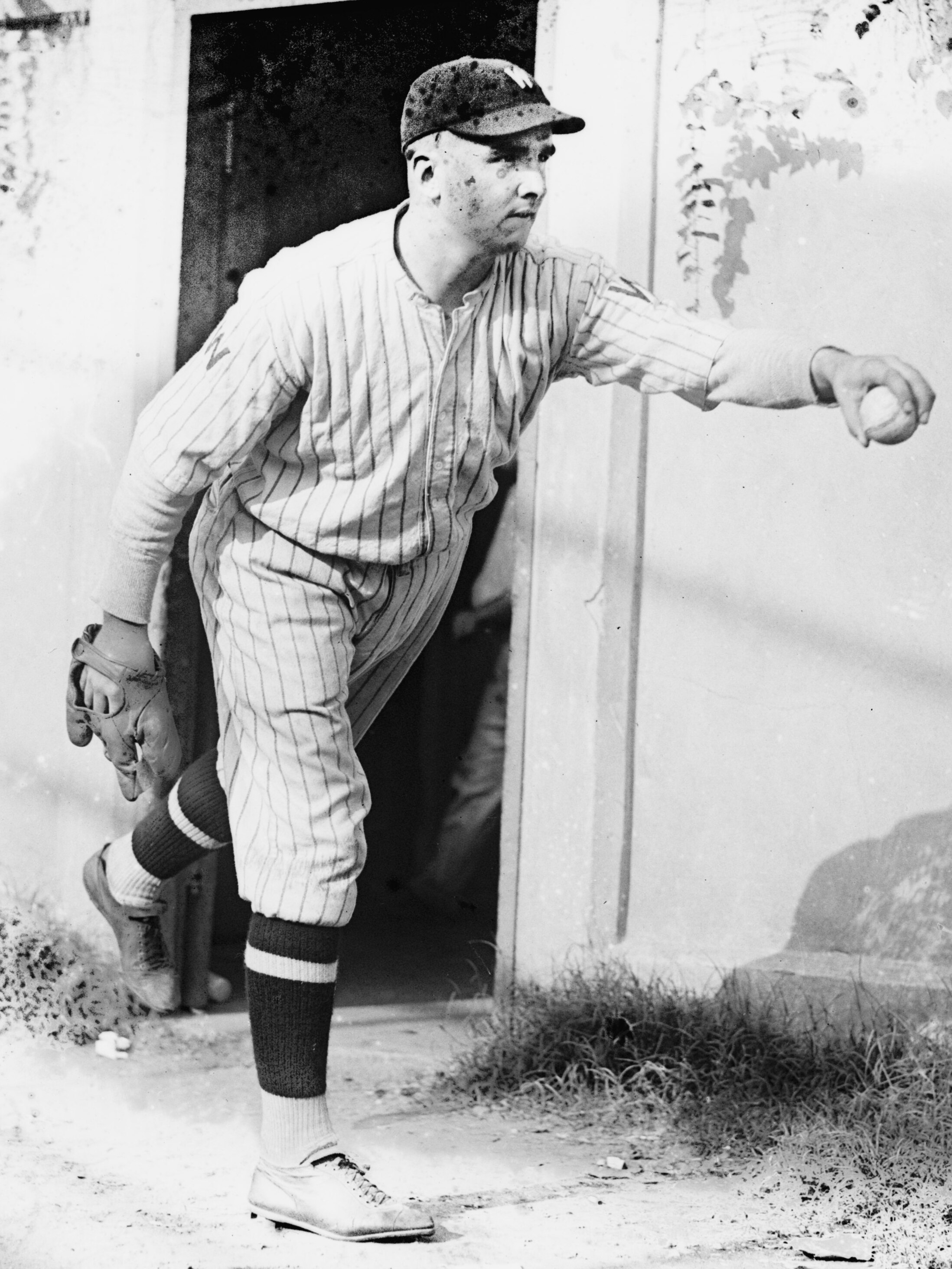
- Pitcher
- Born: January 14, 1899; Vinton, Iowa
- Died: February 18, 1967 (aged 68); White Bear Lake, Minnesota
- Batted: Right Threw: Left

MLB debut
- September 16, 1921, for the Washington Senators

Last MLB appearance
- September 16, 1921, for the Washington Senators

MLB statistics
- Games pitched: 1
- Innings pitched: 1.0
- Earned run average: 0.00
- Stats at Baseball Reference

Teams
- Washington Senators (1921)

Ralph Henry Miller (January 14, 1899 – February 18, 1967) was an American professional baseball player. He played in Major League Baseball for one game as a pitcher for the Washington Senators on September 16, 1921.

Ralph's older brother Bing Miller played 16 seasons in the Major Leagues from 1921 through 1936.
