= Franklin Seaver Pratt =

American businessman (1829–1894)

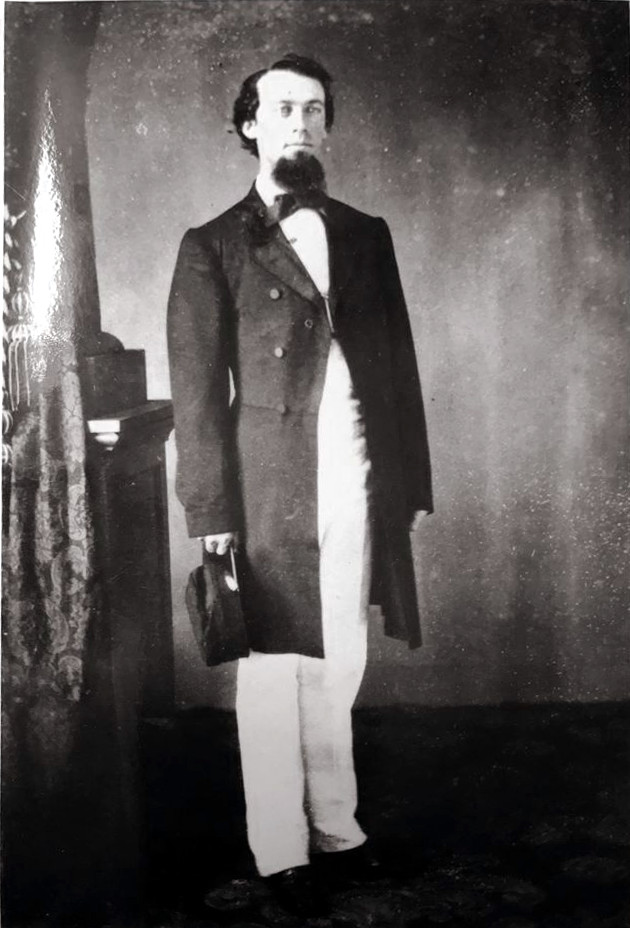

Kingdom of Hawaii Consul-General in San Francisco
- In office 1892–1893
- Preceded by: David Allison McKinley
- Succeeded by: Charles Thomas Wilder

Personal details
- Born: November 1, 1829 Boston, Massachusetts, United States
- Died: January 11, 1894 (aged 65) Honolulu, Oahu, Provisional Government of Hawaii
- Resting place: Oahu Cemetery
- Spouse: Elizabeth Kekaʻaniau Laʻanui
- Education: Franklin Institute
- Occupation: Politician, businessman, plantation owner, diplomat

Franklin Seaver Pratt (November 1, 1829 – January 11, 1894), also known as Franklyn or Frank S. Pratt, was an American businessman, public servant and diplomat of the Kingdom of Hawaii. He served as the Hawaiian consul for the Pacific States of California, Nevada, Oregon, and Washington around the time of the overthrow of the Kingdom of Hawaii in 1893. Pratt married Elizabeth Kekaʻaniau Laʻanui, a member of Hawaiian nobility, and he defended her claims to the Hawaiian crown lands during the overthrow. He died shortly after his return to Hawaii.

== Early life and business career ==
Pratt was born on November 1, 1829, in Boston, Massachusetts. His parents were Joseph Pratt and Catherine Seaver. At the time of his death in 1898, he had one brother and four sisters (including the widow of Hawaii businessman Charles Brewer II) who survived him. A younger brother, Tasker S. Pratt, died of consumption (tuberculosis) in Honolulu on January 9, 1866, at the age of 32.

He was educated at the Franklin Institute in Philadelphia, Pennsylvania. On January 12, 1850, he and William Fessenden Allen sailed for Hawaii, on the ship Eliza Warwick and arrived in Honolulu. Attracted by the California Gold Rush, he briefly settled in San Francisco where he worked with a mercantile firm. However, he later returned and settled in Hawaii by the time of his marriage. Pratt became a successful businessman during his residency in Hawaii. He worked initially in the merchandising business with a Mr. Luddington and later partnered with C. A. Williams in a number of different businesses. He later assumed the agency of the Phoenix Guano Islands Company, which he held for seven or eight years, and gained considerable amount of wealth from this venture. After returning from a visit his family in New England, he began investing in the growing sugar plantation industry in the islands. He started Waimanalo Sugar Plantation and built the steamer Waimanalo. In 1881, his investment in the Olowalu plantation on Maui failed, and nearly caused him to lose everything he earned. He returned to Honolulu from Maui and worked in the auctioneer business with L. J. Leavey until he began working for the government in 1884.

== Marriage and family ==
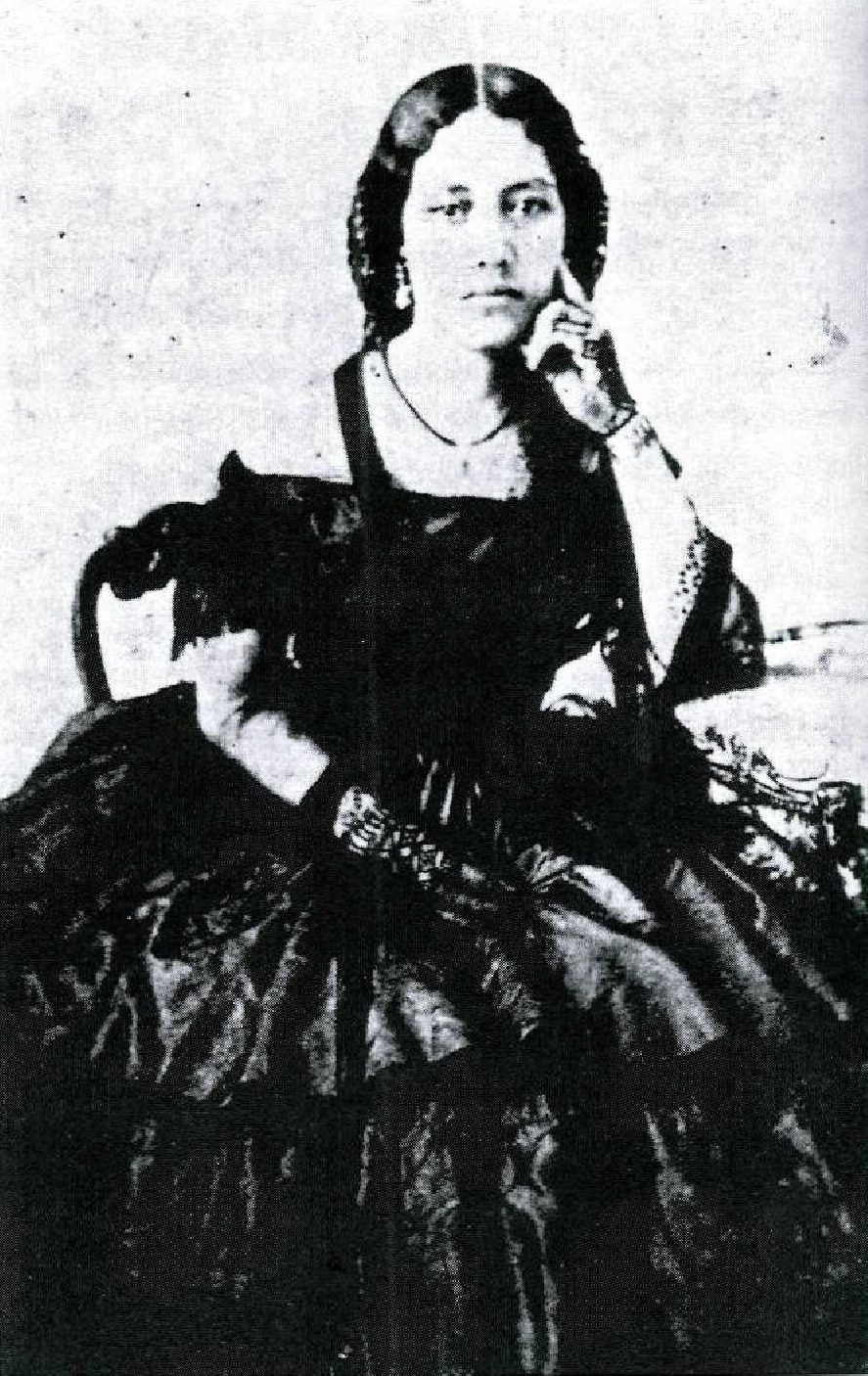
High Chiefess Elizabeth Kekaʻaniau Laʻanui, wife of Franklin Seaver Pratt

On April 27, 1864, Pratt married High Chiefess Elizabeth Kekaʻaniau Laʻanui, a great-grandniece of King Kamehameha I, being a great-granddaughter of Kalokuokamaile, the older brother of Kamehameha I. A collateral relation of the reigning House of Kamehameha, his wife attended the Chiefs' Children's School, also known as Royal School, a select school for the children of the highest rank in Hawaii, and was chosen by Kamehameha III to be eligible for the throne of the Kingdom of Hawaii. According to contemporary opinion, she was "well-known as one of the brightest and most cultivated women of Honolulu" and "became his faithful companion and helper" after their marriage.

The couple did not have any children of their own, although they adopted her niece, Theresa Owana Laʻanui, daughter of her brother Gideon Kailipalaki Laʻanui II, when he died in 1871. She married four times and had descendants by her first and second husband: Alexander Cartwright III, son of Honolulu fire chief Alexander Cartwright, and Robert William Wilcox, the first Congressional Delegate from the Territory of Hawaii. The Pratts also later adopted Alexander and Theresa's younger daughter Eva Kuwailanimamao Cartwright. who married Dwight Styne and had descendants. These descendants continue to claim to be the rightful successors of the Kamehameha line and claimant to the Hawaiian crown lands through Kekaʻaniau's status as the last surviving member of the Royal School.

== Political career ==
Through his wife's royal connections, Pratt developed a close relationship with the royal family of Hawaii. Kekaʻaniau was a close friend, lady-in-waiting and bridesmaid of her cousin Queen Emma, the wife of Kamehameha IV. Pratt himself was also a close friend of the queen. He was appointed an honorary Colonel on the personal staff of King Kamehameha V, on September 13, 1867. After Kamehameha's death and the short-lived reign of his elected successor Lunalilo, the Hawaiian throne was left vacant and a second royal election was convened by the legislature of the kingdom to choose a new monarch from the eligible aliʻi (chiefly) families. Although his wife's status and a decree of Kamehameha III made her eligible to succeed to the throne, she never considered doing so. Only two candidates were seriously considered Queen Emma and David Kalākaua, both Royal School classmates and cousins of Kekaʻaniau.

Due to their close ties to Emma, Pratt and Kekaʻaniau actively supported her candidacy during the contentious election. According to Liliuokalani, Queen Emma intended to reward with his loyalty with a government appointment by removing John Owen Dominis as Governor of Oahu and appointing Pratt in his place. Despite popular support for the queen dowager, the assembly voted thirty-nine to six in favor of Kalākaua over Emma. The subsequent announcement triggered the Honolulu Courthouse riot as Emmaite supporters hunted down and attacked native legislators who supported Kalākaua. In order to quell the civil disruption, American and British troops were landed with the permission of the Hawaiian government, and the rioters were arrested.

Under the new dynasty, Pratt continued his personal association with the defeated Queen Emma. According to an 1876 letter by Emma to her cousin Peter Kaʻeo, Pratt played a role in spreading false rumors that King Kalākaua had contracted leprosy. In the letter, Emma wrote: "Mr Pratt saw him at the Emma Square yesterday together with his wife in the carriage...[and] remarked that D. K. looked for all the world as if he had got the leprosy. His face was swollen in red blotches."

After many years in the business sector, he began working for the government. However, the relatively unimportant positions he held still relegated him to the "periphery of power". From 1884 to 1892, Pratt worked as the Registrar of Public Accounts. When she ascended the throne, Queen Liliuokalani appointed him to her Privy Council of State, the advisory council for the monarch; he served from March 7, 1891, until July 8, 1892. In October 1892, Pratt was appointed as Consul-General of the Hawaiian Government at San Francisco in the United States, succeeding David Allison McKinley (brother of the future US President William McKinley). In this post, he acted as the Hawaiian Kingdom's diplomatic and commercial representatives for the Pacific States of California, Nevada, Oregon, and Washington. On March 28, 1891, Queen Liliuokalani granted Mr. Pratt a Knight Commander of the Royal Order of Kalakaua in the Blue room of Iolani Palace. On January 17, 1893, the Hawaiian monarchy was overthrown and the Provisional Government was established until a treaty of annexation could be ratified by the United States Congress.

Pratt continued as Hawaiian Consul in San Francisco under the Provisional Government under the presidency of Sanford B. Dole. However, in February 1893, Pratt wrote to the United States Secretary of State John W. Foster and Vice President Levi P. Morton on behalf of his wife to defend her claims to the Hawaiian crown lands as an heir of Kamehameha III. At the same time, he also lodged a protest against the Provisional Government in the San Francisco Chronicle, a local California newspaper, signing himself as "Hawaiian Consul-General". Because of these actions, Pratt was removed, on March 28, from his office as Consul by Dole and the Executory and Advisory Council of the Provisional Government. He was succeeded by Charles Thomas Wilder.

In his February 24 letter to Secretary Foster, Pratt wrote:

Kekaaniau, chief heir by blood of Kamehameha III, to protest against the sequestration of the crown lands of Hawaii by treaty of annexation having been advised that these lands revert to the corporal heirs of that King upon the suppression of the crown.

== Death and burial ==
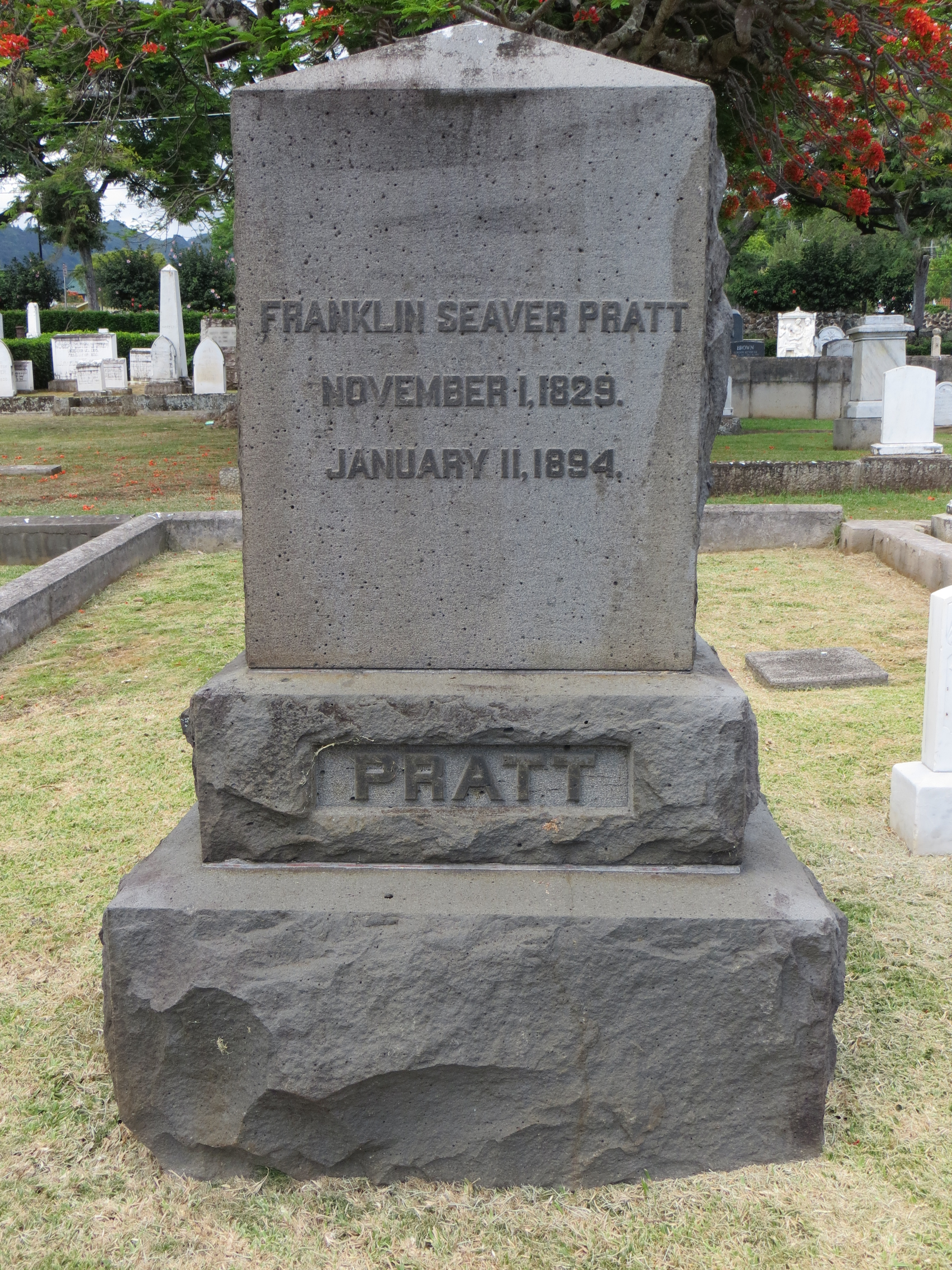
Gravestone at Oahu Cemetery

Returning to Honolulu, Pratt fell ill and died on January 11, 1894, from dropsy (edema), at his residence on Printer's Lane in Honolulu.

The Hawaii Holomua Progress reported on the last hour of the deceased businessman and the effect on his surviving relatives and friends:

It was not an unexpected event which happened, yesterday afternoon, when the death of Mr. Frank S. Pratt, a well known citizen was announced, yet, for ail the weeks of preparation which the loving family and friends had had in which to steel their feelings against the inevitable victory of the fell destroyer, there were no dry eyes around the bedside of the departed when the result was evident. Death came slowly and with attendant pain but the end was reached with fortitude, the final summons being answered at a few minutes past 4 o'clock and in presence of the family.

— The Hawaii Holomua Progress, January 12, 1894, p. 3

By the death of Frank Pratt, the Hawaiians have lost another of their most faithful friends. The deceased who had resided for nearly half a century in this country was a man who, to the fullest extent, possessed the confidence of the whole community foreigners and Hawaiians alike. In the different occupations in which he engaged during his long residence, he always succeeded in making friends. Although he covered hs natural kindness of heart under a somewhat brusque manner, everybody who knew him or everybody who needed him soon learned to know this sterling qualities. Mr. Pratt was married but leaves no children. We extend our heartfelt sympathy to the bereaved widow in her great sorrow..

— The Hawaii Holomua Progress, January 12, 1894, p. 2

Pratt died intestate and left an estate valued at $10,000, which was divided between his widow and his surviving siblings in the Boston. After a funeral service at St. Andrew's Cathedral, he was buried at the Oahu Cemetery in Honolulu. His widow Kekaʻaniau died in 1928, at the age of 94, and was buried beside him.

== Bibliography ==
- Dabagh, Jean; Lyons, Curtis Jere; Hitchcock, Harvey Rexford (1974). Dabagh, Jean (ed.). "A King is Elected: One Hundred Years Ago" (PDF). The Hawaiian Journal of History. 8. Honolulu: Hawaiian Historical Society: 76–89. hdl:10524/112. OCLC 60626541.
- Forbes, David W., ed. (2003). Hawaiian National Bibliography, 1780–1900, Volume 4: 1881–1900. Vol. 4. Honolulu: University of Hawaii Press. ISBN 978-0-8248-2636-9. OCLC 123279964.
- Haley, James L. (2014). Captive Paradise: A History of Hawaii. New York: St. Martin's Press. pp. 200, 216. ISBN 978-0-312-60065-5.
- Kaeo, Peter; Queen Emma (1976). Korn, Alfons L. (ed.). News from Molokai, Letters Between Peter Kaeo & Queen Emma, 1873–1876. Honolulu: The University Press of Hawaii. hdl:10125/39980. ISBN 978-0-8248-0399-5. OCLC 2225064.
- Kanahele, George S. (1999). Emma: Hawaii's Remarkable Queen. Honolulu: University of Hawaii Press. ISBN 978-0-8248-2240-8. OCLC 40890919.
- Kuykendall, Ralph Simpson (1967). The Hawaiian Kingdom 1874–1893, The Kalakaua Dynasty. Vol. 3. Honolulu: University of Hawaii Press. ISBN 978-0-87022-433-1. OCLC 500374815.
- Liliuokalani (1898). Hawaii's Story by Hawaii's Queen, Liliuokalani. Boston: Lee and Shepard. ISBN 978-0-548-22265-2. OCLC 2387226.
- McKinzie, Edith Kawelohea (1983). Stagner, Ishmael W. (ed.). Hawaiian Genealogies: Extracted from Hawaiian Language Newspapers. Vol. 1. Honolulu: University of Hawaii Press. pp. 33–38. ISBN 0-939154-28-5. OCLC 12555087.
- Nucciarone, Monica (2009). Alexander Cartwright: The Life Behind the Baseball Legend. Lincoln: University of Nebraska Press. ISBN 978-0-8032-3353-9. OCLC 268789911.
- Pratt, Elizabeth Kekaaniauokalani Kalaninuiohilaukapu (1920). History of Keoua Kalanikupuapa-i-nui: Father of Hawaii Kings, and His Descendants, with Notes on Kamehameha I, First King of All Hawaii. Honolulu: Honolulu Star-Bulletin. OCLC 154181545.
- Van Dyke, Jon M. (2008). Who Owns the Crown Lands of Hawaiʻi?. Honolulu: University of Hawaii Press. ISBN 978-0-8248-6560-3. OCLC 257449971.
