= Rusty Pence =

American baseball player (1900–1971)

- Pitcher
- Born: March 11, 1900; Marine, Illinois, U.S.
- Died: August 11, 1971 (aged 71); Hot Springs, Arkansas, U.S.
- Batted: Right Threw: Right

MLB debut
- May 13, 1921, for the Chicago White Sox

Last MLB appearance
- May 30, 1921, for the Chicago White Sox

MLB statistics
- Win–loss record: 0–0
- Strikeouts: 2
- Earned run average: 8.44
- Stats at Baseball Reference

Teams
- Chicago White Sox (1921)

Russell William Pence (March 11, 1900 – August 11, 1971) was a Major League Baseball pitcher. He pitched for the Chicago White Sox in 1921.
