= Roy Wilkinson (baseball) =

American baseball player (1893–1956)

- Pitcher
- Born: May 8, 1894; Canandaigua, New York, U.S.
- Died: July 2, 1956 (aged 62); Louisville, Kentucky, U.S.
- Batted: Right Threw: Right

MLB debut
- April 29, 1918, for the Cleveland Indians

Last MLB appearance
- May 2, 1922, for the Chicago White Sox

MLB statistics
- Win–loss record: 12–31
- Earned run average: 4.66
- Strikeouts: 88
- Stats at Baseball Reference

Teams
- Cleveland Indians (1918); Chicago White Sox (1919–1922)

Roy Hamilton Wilkinson (May 8, 1893 – July 2, 1956) was an American pitcher in Major League Baseball for five seasons. He played for the Cleveland Indians and the Chicago White Sox.

Wilkinson started his professional career in 1913. In 1919, he had a good season with the Columbus Senators of the American Association, going 17–15 with a 2.08 earned run average. He joined the White Sox in time to pitch two games in the 1919 World Series, which was tainted by the Black Sox Scandal.

In 1921, he was placed in the starting rotation and went 4–20.

He was a very good fielding pitcher in his major league career. Wilkinson recorded a .985 fielding percentage, with only two errors in 135 total chances in 380.2 innings pitched.

From 1922 to 1932, Wilkinson pitched for Kansas City and Louisville in the AA. He compiled a 130–119 career record in that league.

He was married twice. His first wife, Melissa Beers Wilkinson, who he married in 1914, died in 1918. He remarried in 1919 to Jessie Rosenbloom and had a daughter, June Mary Wilkinson, born in 1920.
