= Lee Thompson (baseball) =

American baseball player (1898–1963)

- Pitcher
- Born: February 26, 1898; Smithfield, Utah
- Died: February 17, 1963 (aged 64); Santa Barbara, California
- Batted: Left Threw: Left

MLB debut
- September 4, 1921, for the Chicago White Sox

Last MLB appearance
- September 23, 1921, for the Chicago White Sox

MLB statistics
- Win–loss record: 0–3
- Earned run average: 8.27
- Strikeouts: 4
- Stats at Baseball Reference

Teams
- Chicago White Sox (1921)

John Dudley "Lee" Thompson (February 26, 1898 – February 17, 1963) was a Major League Baseball pitcher who played for the Chicago White Sox in 1921.

Prior to baseball, Thompson served in the U.S. Army during WW1, and he was a sergeant during WW2, becoming a veteran of both wars.
