= George Foss (baseball) =

American baseball player (1897-1969)

- Third baseman
- Born: June 13, 1897; Register, Georgia, U.S.
- Died: November 10, 1969 (aged 72); Brandon, Florida, U.S.
- Batted: Right Threw: Right

MLB debut
- April 16, 1921, for the Washington Senators

Last MLB appearance
- August 26, 1921, for the Washington Senators
- Stats at Baseball Reference

Teams
- Washington Senators (1921)

George Dueward Foss (June 13, 1897 – November 10, 1969) was an American Major League Baseball player. He played as a third baseman and pinch hitter for the Washington Senators in 1921.
