= Red Ostergard =

American baseball player (1896–1977)

- Pinch hitter
- Born: May 16, 1896; Denmark, Wisconsin
- Died: January 13, 1977 (aged 80); Hemet, California
- Batted: Right Threw: Right

MLB debut
- June 14, 1921, for the Chicago White Sox

Last MLB appearance
- August 17, 1921, for the Chicago White Sox

MLB statistics
- At bats: 11
- Hits: 4
- Batting average: .364
- Stats at Baseball Reference

Teams
- Chicago White Sox (1921)

Roy Lund "Red" Ostergard (May 16, 1896 – January 13, 1977) was a pinch hitter in Major League Baseball. He was born in Denmark, Wisconsin, and attended college at Southwestern University.

In 1921, Ostergard made his major league debut with the Chicago White Sox. He was inserted as a pinch hitter 11 times that summer, hit 4 singles, and scored 2 runs. That was the only time he ever appeared in the majors.

Ostergard then played in the Texas League from 1923 to 1925. He put up good hitting numbers there, batting over .320 all three seasons and hitting a total of 59 home runs. He then spent one year in the Southern Association and one year in the South Atlantic League.

Ostergard died in 1977, in Hemet, California.
