= Frank Woodward (baseball) =

American baseball player (1894–1961)

- Pitcher
- Born: May 17, 1894; New Haven, Connecticut, U.S.
- Died: June 11, 1961 (aged 67); New Haven, Connecticut, U.S.
- Batted: Right Threw: Right

MLB debut
- April 17, 1918, for the Philadelphia Phillies

Last MLB appearance
- April 29, 1923, for the Chicago White Sox

MLB statistics
- Win–loss record: 9-15
- Earned run average: 4.23
- Strikeouts: 55
- Stats at Baseball Reference

Teams
- Philadelphia Phillies (1918–19); St. Louis Cardinals (1919); Washington Senators (1921–22); Chicago White Sox (1923)

Frank Russell Woodward (May 17, 1894 – June 11, 1961) was an American professional baseball pitcher. He played all or part of five seasons in Major League Baseball between 1918 and 1923 for the Philadelphia Phillies, St. Louis Cardinals, Washington Senators, and Chicago White Sox.
