= Jack Wieneke =

American baseball player (1894–1933)

- Pitcher
- Born: March 10, 1894; Saltsburg, Pennsylvania, U.S.
- Died: March 16, 1933 (aged 39); Pleasant Ridge, Michigan, U.S.
- Batted: Right Threw: Left

MLB debut
- July 4, 1921, for the Chicago White Sox

Last MLB appearance
- August 22, 1921, for the Chicago White Sox

MLB statistics
- Win–loss record: 0–1
- Earned run average: 8.17
- Strikeouts: 10
- Stats at Baseball Reference

Teams
- Chicago White Sox (1921)

John Wieneke (March 10, 1894 – March 16, 1933) was an American Major League Baseball pitcher who played in 1921 with the Chicago White Sox. He batted right and threw left-handed.
