= Frank Pratt (baseball) =

American baseball player (1897–1974)

- Pinch hitter
- Born: August 24, 1897; Blocton, Alabama, U.S.
- Died: March 8, 1974 (aged 76); Centreville, Alabama, U.S.
- Batted: Left Threw: Right

MLB debut
- May 13, 1921, for the Chicago White Sox

Last MLB appearance
- May 13, 1921, for the Chicago White Sox

MLB statistics
- Games played: 1
- At bats: 1
- Hits: 0
- Stats at Baseball Reference

Teams
- Chicago White Sox (1921)

Francis Bruce "Trackhorse" Pratt (August 24, 1897 – March 8, 1974) was a pinch hitter in Major League Baseball. He played for the Chicago White Sox in 1921.
