= House of Laʻanui =

Collateral branch of the Hawaiian royal family

The House of Laʻanui (Hale O Laʻanui in the Hawaiian language) is a family of heirs to the throne of the Kingdom of Hawaiʻi collateral to the House of Kamehameha. Both houses are branches of the House of Keōua Nui.

The House of Laʻanui stems from the High Chief Laʻanui who was the son of Nuhi, the ruler of Waimea, Hawaiʻi and became the aliʻi nui of Waialua. He was one of the main chief warriors who went to Kauaʻi to subdue George Prince Kaumualiʻi. His eldest offspring was a daughter named Elizabeth Kekaʻaniauokalani Laʻanui, the youngest, or muli loa was a son named Gideon Kailipalaki-o-Keheananui Laʻanui. The House of Laʻanui was continued through these two children after Laʻanui himself died on 12 September 1849 and buried within the Liliʻuokalani Church cemetery grounds of his old estate where he ruled. His daughter Elizabeth Kekaʻaniau Laʻanui became the only survivor of the Hawaiian nobility who were eligible to the throne after the death of Liliʻuokalani, the last queen of Hawaiʻi. Her brother's child, High Chiefess Owana Kaʻohelelani Laanui was the only descendant from the House of Laʻanui to have children and comprise the royal descendants from the house of Keōua nui the progenitor of the Kamehamehas.

== Kalokuokamaile ==
The eldest branch of the House of Keōua Nui is from descendants of chiefs of the Kona district of the island of Hawaiʻi, and from the island of Maui. The dynastic line was established by Kalokuokamaile who was the eldest half-brother of King Kamehameha I, who established the reigning House of Kamehameha. Kalokuokamaile was the son of High Chief Keōua Kalanikupuapaikalaninui and High Chiefess Kahikikala-o-kalani of Western Maui.

== Laʻanui-Kalokuokamaile ==
The male line of Kalokuokamaile became extinct when Kalokuokamaile did not produce a male heir. He was survived by his daughter Kaohelelani, by his wife Kaloiokalani of Kahikinui and Honuaula descent. Kaohelelani married Nuhi, who was a ruling chief of Waimea, Hawaii. Rather than being called the House of Nuhi, the House continued under the name of their son, Gideon Peleʻioholani Laʻanui. Gideon's male line came to end in 1944 after the death of Theresa Owana Laʻanui, the last female descendants.

Her descendants:

- For daughters, Eva and Daisy,
  (Cartwright-Laʻanui-Kalokuokamaile).
- For grandchildren, Elliot, Dwight, and Emily
  (Styne-Cartwright-Laʻanui-Kalokuokamaile).
- For son, Robert, from whom descend many other branches.
  (Wilcox-Laʻanui-Kalokuokamaile).
- For the most active branch of Robert's descendants under Noa and his mother, Owana
  (Wilcox-Laʻanui-Kalokuokamaile-DeGuair-Salazar).
- For daughter, Virginia (Wilcox-Laʻanui-Kalokuokamaile).
  For Virginia's descendants (Miller-Wilcox-Laʻanui-Kalokuokamaile).

== Claims to the throne ==
The Laʻanui are the descendants of the brother of Elizabeth Kekaʻaniau, who attended the Chiefs' Children's School. Each of the 15 royal children was declared eligible to succeed to the Hawaiian throne by King Kamehameha III with approval of the House of Nobles. Elizabeth was preemptive to the throne and was the last survivor of the Hawaiian nobility who officially could become a ruler, outliving all other royals. Elizabeth and her brother had the distinction of being the seniority line of the royal house of Keoua nui. In 1920, Elizabeth claims her niece Theresa Owana Kaʻohelelani Laʻanui will succeed as the head of the royal house and then her descendants will follow by their primogeniture rights. The Laʻanui descendants never relinquished their royal claims, and continue to protest, inserting titles of nobility, creating orders of knighthood, satisfying the prevention of prescription under international law to protect sovereignty and their royal rights.

Elizabeth Kekaʻaniau also protested to the United States to protect the crown lands from annexation. Her claim was that the crown lands were the private lands of Kamehameha III in trust for the person who sits on the throne. Without the seat of the monarch, the crown lands should be inherited by the primogeniture family of Kamehameha III instead of transferring the lands to the United States and that her rights should not be ignored as she is a legitimate claimant to the crown lands.

Members of the Laʻanui family are often referred to with the titles of prince and princess.

== Members of the family ==
Laʻanui, Wilcox, Salazar family tree

**Key: Subjects with bold titles and blue bold box = Aliʻi line. Bold title and grey bolded box = Lower ranking Aliʻi line. Bold title and un-bolded box = European nobility. Regular name and box = makaʻāinana or untitled foreign subject**.

**Keōua** (Note: Hawaiian Native Claims Settlement Study Commission, Exhibit B, Genealogy Descent from the Kamehameha Royal Family .)	Kahikikalaokalani	**Kekuʻiapoiwa II**
**Kalokuokamaile**	Kaloiokalani	**Kaʻahumanu**	**Kamehameha I**	**Kalākua Kaheiheimālie**
**Kaohele**	Nuhi	Jean Baptiste Rives	**Holau II**
**Makole (k)**	**Haupa (w)**	**Namahana Piia (w)**	**Gideon Peleioholani Laanui**; 1797–1849 **né Laʻanui**	**Theresa Owana Kaheiheimalie Reeves**
Captain William Slocum Wilcox; 1814–1910	**Kalua**; 1836–1865	**Gideon Kailipalaki Laanui**; 1840–1871	Elizabeth Kamaikaopa	**Elizabeth Kekaʻaniau Laʻanui Pratt**; 1834–1928 **née Elizabeth Kekaʻaniau**
**Gina Sobrero-Wilcox**; 1863-1912 (**née Baroness Gina Sobrero**)	**Robert William Kalanihiapo Wilcox** (February 15, 1855 - October 23, 1903) (Note: Historical Dictionary of the Gilded Age lists Wilcox's full birth and death dating.)	**Theresa Owana Kaʻohelelani Laʻanui**	Alexander Joy Cartwright III	Elmer Miller (Note: Marriage license of Jno K. Kilioe Miller to Virginia K. Wilcox list E.O Miller as father and Makalike as mother of Jno. (Note: "E.O.Miller". Family Search. Territory of Hawaii. Marriage license of Jno Miller to Virginia K. Wilcox - E. O. Miller in entry for Jno. K. Miller and Virginia K. Wilcox, 11 Jun 1916; citing Honolulu, Honolulu, Hawaii, reference 12495B; FHL microfilm 1,711,737))	Makalike
**Robert Kalanikupuapaikalaninui Keōua Wilcox**	Helen Kaleipuanani Simerson Wilburton	John Kilioe Miller; May 26, 1896 - April 20, 1969 (Note: United States World War I Draft Registration Cards, 1917-1918. (Note: "John K. Miller". Family Search. Territory of Hawaii.Draft card - John K Miller, 1917-1918; citing Honolulu City no 1, Hawaii, United States, NARA microfilm publication M1509 (Washington D.C.: National Archives and Records Administration, n.d.); FHL microfilm 1,452,096))	**Virginia Kahoa Kaʻahumanu Kaihikapumahana Wilcox** (Note: Hawaii Marriages, 1826-1922.)	**Elizabeth Kaʻakaualaninui Wilcox**	Daisy Emmalani Napulahaokalani Cartwright	Eva Kuwailanimamao Cartwright
Henry Mario Salazar	**Helena Kalokuokamaile Wilcox Salazar-Machado**; April 13, 1917 – September 17, 1988 (née Wilcox)	Henry Machado, Sr.
**Henry C. Keaweikekahialiiokamoku Salazar**	**Paul C. Kalokuokamaile Salazar**	**Michael Carl Kauhiokalani Salazar**	**Stephen Craig Laanui Salazar**	**Owana Kaohelelani Mahealani-Rose Salazar**
