= Laanui =

Laʻanui may refer to:

- Gideon Peleioholani Laanui
- Gideon Kailipalaki Laanui
- Elizabeth Kekaaniau Laanui
- Theresa Owana Kaohelelani Laanui
- House of Laanui
