= Helena Kalokuokamaile Wilcox =

Hawaiian royalty (1917 – 1988

- Born: April 13, 1917
- Died: September 17, 1988 (aged 71)
- Other name: Kalokuokamaile II
- Spouses: Henry Mario Salazar; Henry Machado Sr.
- Children: 5, including Owana Kaohelelani Mahealani-Rose Salazar

Helena Kalokuokamaile Wilcox Salazar-Machado (April 13, 1917 – September 17, 1988) was an aspirant head of the royal family of the Kingdom of Hawaii.

== Life ==
Helena Kalokuokamaile Wilcox was born April 13, 1917. Her father was Robert Kalanikupuapaikalaninui Keōua Wilcox (1893–1934) of the House of Kalokuokamaile, the eldest collateral branch of the House of Kamehameha. Her mother was his first wife Helen Kaleipuanani Simerson Wilburton. Her father Robert Keōua was son of Theresa Owana Kaohelelani Laʻanui and her second husband Robert William Wilcox (1855–1903).

She based her claim to the Hawaiian crown on her family's descent from King Kamehameha I's eldest half-brother Kalokuokamaile, and through her great grand aunt, Elizabeth Kekaaniau Laʻanui Pratt, a dynast named by King Kamehameha III, and a student at the Royal School developed to educate royal heirs. She used the regal name Kalokuokamaile II, stating that she was Kalokuokamaile's successor.

Helena was Aliʻi Nui of the Ka Lahui Hawaiʻi Organization from 1987 until her death. She wrote a history of the Kaʻahumanu Society in 1980 titled Kaahumanu Diamond Jubilee: A Brief History.

== Family ==
She married Henry Mario Salazar, younger son of Manuel Bernardino Salazar by his wife María Enriqueta de la Huerta. She married secondly Henry Machado Sr. She had children from her first marriage.

=== Children ===
- Henry C. Keaweikekahialiiokamoku Salazar
- Paul C. Kalokuokamaile Salazar
- Michael Carl Kauhiokalani Salazar
- Stephen Craig Laanui Salazar
- Owana Kaohelelani Mahealani-Rose Salazar

She died on September 19, 1988, at the age of 71. Despite having surviving sons, she named Owana Kuhina Nui and Owana's son, Noa, as Aliʻi Nui Kalokuokamaile III. She informed Owana's brothers that their sister and her son would succeed her.

=== Tree ===
Laʻanui, Wilcox, Salazar family tree

**Key: Subjects with bold titles and blue bold box = Aliʻi line. Bold title and grey bolded box = Lower ranking Aliʻi line. Bold title and un-bolded box = European nobility. Regular name and box = makaʻāinana or untitled foreign subject**.

**Keōua** (Note: Hawaiian Native Claims Settlement Study Commission, Exhibit B, Genealogy Descent from the Kamehameha Royal Family .)	Kahikikalaokalani	**Kekuʻiapoiwa II**
**Kalokuokamaile**	Kaloiokalani	**Kaʻahumanu**	**Kamehameha I**	**Kalākua Kaheiheimālie**
**Kaohele**	Nuhi	Jean Baptiste Rives	**Holau II**
**Makole (k)**	**Haupa (w)**	**Namahana Piia (w)**	**Gideon Peleioholani Laanui**; 1797–1849 **né Laʻanui**	**Theresa Owana Kaheiheimalie Reeves**
Captain William Slocum Wilcox; 1814–1910	**Kalua**; 1836–1865	**Gideon Kailipalaki Laanui**; 1840–1871	Elizabeth Kamaikaopa	**Elizabeth Kekaʻaniau Laʻanui Pratt**; 1834–1928 **née Elizabeth Kekaʻaniau**
**Gina Sobrero-Wilcox**; 1863-1912 (**née Baroness Gina Sobrero**)	**Robert William Kalanihiapo Wilcox** (February 15, 1855 - October 23, 1903) (Note: Historical Dictionary of the Gilded Age lists Wilcox's full birth and death dating.)	**Theresa Owana Kaʻohelelani Laʻanui**	Alexander Joy Cartwright III	Elmer Miller (Note: Marriage license of Jno K. Kilioe Miller to Virginia K. Wilcox list E.O Miller as father and Makalike as mother of Jno. (Note: "E.O.Miller". Family Search. Territory of Hawaii. Marriage license of Jno Miller to Virginia K. Wilcox - E. O. Miller in entry for Jno. K. Miller and Virginia K. Wilcox, 11 Jun 1916; citing Honolulu, Honolulu, Hawaii, reference 12495B; FHL microfilm 1,711,737))	Makalike
**Robert Kalanikupuapaikalaninui Keōua Wilcox**	Helen Kaleipuanani Simerson Wilburton	John Kilioe Miller; May 26, 1896 - April 20, 1969 (Note: United States World War I Draft Registration Cards, 1917-1918. (Note: "John K. Miller". Family Search. Territory of Hawaii.Draft card - John K Miller, 1917-1918; citing Honolulu City no 1, Hawaii, United States, NARA microfilm publication M1509 (Washington D.C.: National Archives and Records Administration, n.d.); FHL microfilm 1,452,096))	**Virginia Kahoa Kaʻahumanu Kaihikapumahana Wilcox** (Note: Hawaii Marriages, 1826-1922.)	**Elizabeth Kaʻakaualaninui Wilcox**	Daisy Emmalani Napulahaokalani Cartwright	Eva Kuwailanimamao Cartwright
Henry Mario Salazar	**Helena Kalokuokamaile Wilcox Salazar-Machado**; April 13, 1917 – September 17, 1988 (née Wilcox)	Henry Machado, Sr.
**Henry C. Keaweikekahialiiokamoku Salazar**	**Paul C. Kalokuokamaile Salazar**	**Michael Carl Kauhiokalani Salazar**	**Stephen Craig Laanui Salazar**	**Owana Kaohelelani Mahealani-Rose Salazar**

== Citations ==
Princess Helena Kalokuokamaile Keōua Wilcox House of Keōua Nui Born: April 13, 1917 Died: September 19, 1988
Titles in pretence
Preceded by House of Keoua Nui	— TITULAR — Queen of the Hawaiian Islands; 1987 – September 19, 1988; Reason for succession failure: Kingdom of Hawaii abolished in 1893	Succeeded by Prince Kalokuokamaile III
