= Owana =

Owana may refer to:

Given name:

- Theresa Owana Laanui (1860–1944), daughter of Gideon Kailipalaki Laanui of the House of Laanui
- Owana Salazar, (born 1953), current co-ruler of the House of Keoua Nui

Surname:

- Brice Owana (born 1989), professional Cameroonian footballer
