= Gideon Peleʻioholani Laʻanui =

Hawaiian chief (1797–1849)

- Born: 1797; Waimea
- Died: September 12, 1849 (aged 51–52); Waialua
- Spouse: Namahana Kekuwai-Piʻia; Theresa Owana Kaheiheimalie
- Issue: Elizabeth Kekaʻaniauokalani; Gideon Laʻanui II
- Father: Nuhi
- Mother: Kaohelelani

Gideon Peleʻioholani Laʻanui (1797–1849) was a Hawaiian chief and the grandnephew of Kamehameha the Great, who unified the Hawaiian Islands in 1810. From him descends the House of Laanui.

== Early life ==
Peleʻioholani Laʻanui was probably born at the District of Waimea on the island of Hawaiʻi in 1797. His mother was Chiefess Kaohelelani, formerly heir to Hana, Kipahulu and Kaupo, and daughter of High Chief Kalokuokamaile and High Chiefess Kaloiokalani. His father was the High Chief Nuhi, ruler of Waimea and son of Chief Hinai of Waimea, by his wife, Kupapa-a-I. Nuhi had survived the 1792 battle at Puʻukoholā Heiau where Kamehameha I unified the island of Hawaiʻi. His only sibling was his sister Kekaikuihala.

When Laʻanui was a boy, Kamehameha was still trying to control the District of Waimea; if not in battle, through a matrimonial alliance. His failure to accomplish this through his niece Kaohelelani was a sting to the old warrior's pride, and now he chose a new agent by inviting Laʻanui to his court. The invitation was accepted, and the visit lasted for months. Kamehameha and Queen Kaʻahumanu arranged a marriage between Piia and Laʻanui.

== Marriage to Namahana ==
Namahana Kekuwai-Piʻia was the youngest sister of Queen Kaʻahumanu and formerly one of the queens of Kamehameha I. Piʻia is described as being a person heavily built and not prepossessing in appearance like her sisters Kaʻahumanu and Kaheiheimalie. At last, the proposition was put to Laʻanui, that it was the united wish of the king and queen that the marriage should take place. To wed a woman very many years his senior was not his desire. Yet realizing that it might be perilous to defy the powerful monarch, Laʻanui quietly consented "to take the bitter pill."

The couple lived at Waialua, one of the divisions of land that Piia had received from her father Keeaumoku Papaiahiahi's large estate. Soon after Kamehameha I's death in 1819, Kaʻahumanu became Kuhina Nui and Kamehameha II became king. After this, the first party of missionaries arrived. He and Piia, together with Queen Kaʻahumanu and several other chiefs, were among the first converts to Christianity. They were the first couples to be married by Hiram Bingham I in a Christian ceremony. Their favorite dwelling was Waialua, Oahu. They visited Honolulu only when necessary. Unfortunately, Piia's corpulence did not inure to healthfulness and before long, she sickened and died. On her deathbed, she said to her husband:

"Laʻanui, I wish to divulge a secret in my heart to you. It was not my work that you gave up your patrimonial inheritance to me. It was at the instigation of Kamehameha that I played coyly toward you in order to gratify his selfish motives. For your cheerful sacrifice of what was so dear to your hear I feel it is my duty to repay you. Therefore, in return for great kindness I leave this dear Waialua to you, as well as all the other lands, which I own, for my token of love for you. I cannot die happy without making this reparation while the breath is in my body. Forgive me for the part I took in the wrongful measure."

Laʻanui, in the presence of friends, relatives and retainers, pronounced forgiveness. A few days later Piia died.

== Marriages to Owana and Puohu ==
After Piia's death, he married High Chiefess Theresa Owana Kaheiheimālie Rives. She was one of the twin daughters of Jean Baptiste Rives, the French secretary of Kamehameha II, whose Hawaiian name was Luahine ("Old Woman"). Owana's mother was Chiefess Holau II, descendant of Kaihikapumahana, the only daughter of Lonoikamakahiki Kapuokalani and his wife Kaikilanialliwahine o Puna and sister of Keawehanauikawalu, ancestor of Kekūanaōʻa, father of the last line of the Kamehamehas. His wife and her sister Virginia Kahoa were hānai (adopted) daughters of the Queen Kaʻahumanu and were spoken by Mrs. Gerrit P. Judd as becomingly pretty. Laʻanui was almost twice the age of his young wife.

They lived at Waialua in the Laʻanui Estate, by the Anahulu River. Their town residence became owned by the James Campbell estate. In time a daughter was born. Friends from Honolulu brought offerings to mingle with those of Waialua and were entertained by Laʻanui and Owana.

They named their child Elizabeth Kekaaniauokalani. "Elizabeth" after the baptismal name of Queen Kaʻahumanu, the child's foster grandmother and step-aunt, and the Hawaiian name after one of Laʻanui's sister, the firstborn of Kaohelelani and Nuhi, who died at the age of five years. For five years, they hoped for a male heir. They named their son Gideon Laanui II after his father and Kailipalaki o Keheananui (after the high alii Kinau II).

Gideon later married to his third wife Amelia Puohu (1824–1896) on July 9, 1842. She later remarried and became Mrs. George Carsley.

== Death ==
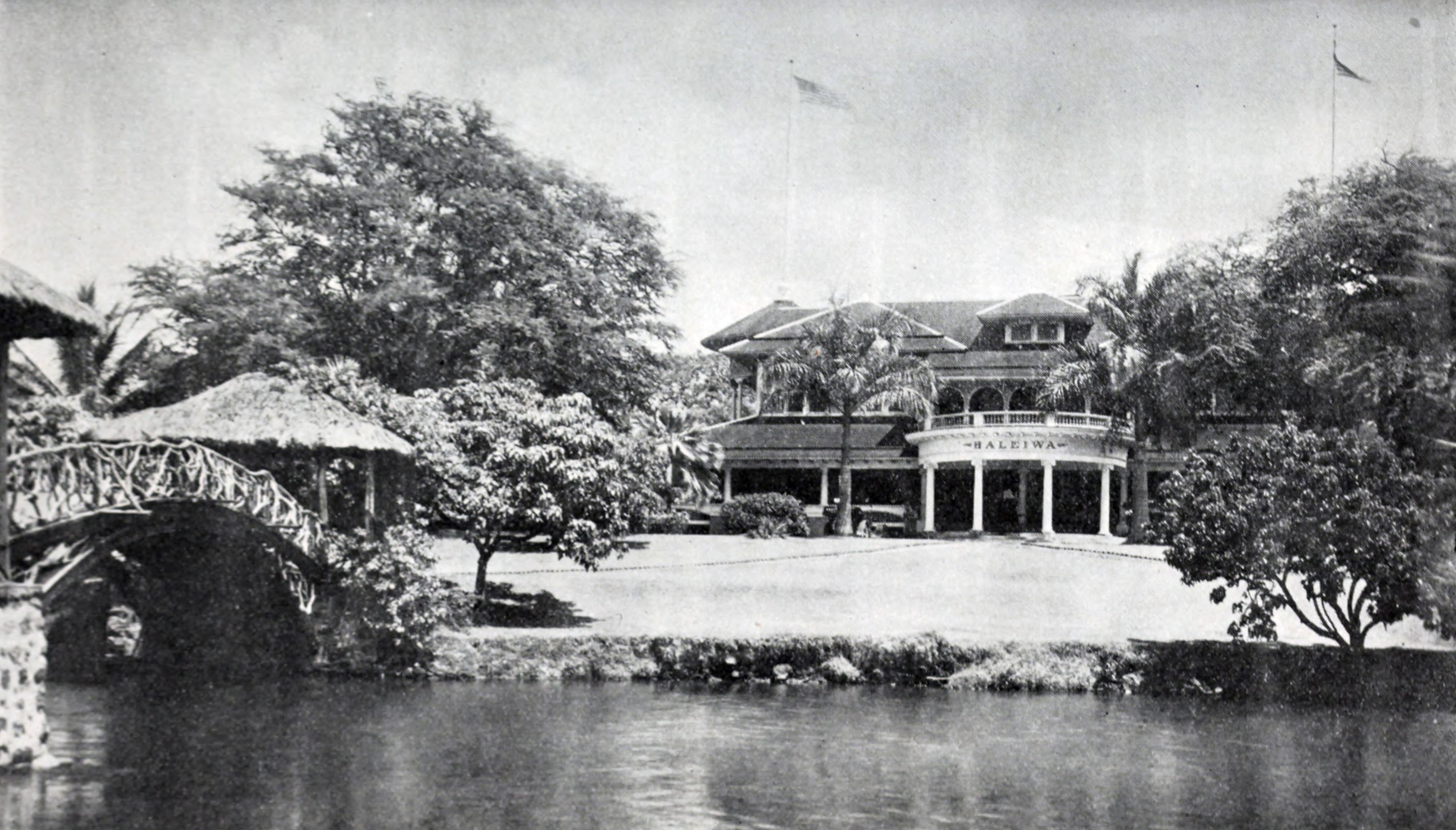
Laʻanui Estate, in Waialua, the residence of Gideon Peleioholani Laanui.

On September 12, 1849, Laʻanui died at his favourite home at Waialua. Elizabeth Kekaaniau was still a minor and attending school as the time. His two children still had some living members of their mother's family: Owana's twin sister and two brothers, who took them to their home. Before this could be arranged notice had to be given to the king and chiefs that, owing to failing health, Amos Starr Cooke with his family was going to close the Royal School.

Eventually a guardian was appointed: John Papa ʻĪʻī who was also administrator of Laʻanui's estate. Upon arriving at maturity, Elizabeth was advised to claim her portion of her father's estates. When she called on ʻĪʻī for this purpose, he astounded her with the information, "There is not much property that I know of which belonged to your father." Being young and unsuspicious she turned toward home little suspecting the wrongs inflicted on her and her brother. How they had been wronged remained a mystery until several years afterward, when a very confidential retainer of Laʻanui's took sick and fearing that death might overtake him at any moment, dispatched a boy to Elizabeth urging her to come to his bedside, as he wished to see her once more before the end came. The next morning, in company with her uncle, she went to the old gentleman awaiting their arrival in great anxiety. After they had partaken of some food the household was summoned to evening prayers as usual, by the sick man's couch, and after delivering the blessing of God, he turned and addressed his guest thus:

"My dear you Aliʻi, I have been a traitor to you and your cause. I have been false to my haku, your beloved father, who brought us to this new residence aside from our own loved land of Waimea, the birthplace of your dear father and his ancestors before him. He placed in my hands a book, which you will find in your room, containing a list of lands to be presented to the Land Office just newly created to secure the legal award of title as ordained by law. I did not follow your father's command, but listened to the tempter. All the lands that I possess as presents from your father it is my wish that they be returned to you after the death of my wife."

The old gentleman died a few hours later and Elizabeth and her brother received their father's inheritance excluding those already lost to Laʻanui's other former retainers and the lands of Hana, Kipahulu, Kaupo, and Waimea lost to Kamehameha, each one being robbed from first to the last. Eventually the Laʻanui Estate at Waialua, Oahu was lost and torn down to build the Haleiwa Hotel.

== Family tree ==
Laʻanui, Wilcox, Salazar family tree

**Key: Subjects with bold titles and blue bold box = Aliʻi line. Bold title and grey bolded box = Lower ranking Aliʻi line. Bold title and un-bolded box = European nobility. Regular name and box = makaʻāinana or untitled foreign subject**.

**Keōua** (Note: Hawaiian Native Claims Settlement Study Commission, Exhibit B, Genealogy Descent from the Kamehameha Royal Family .)	Kahikikalaokalani	**Kekuʻiapoiwa II**
**Kalokuokamaile**	Kaloiokalani	**Kaʻahumanu**	**Kamehameha I**	**Kalākua Kaheiheimālie**
**Kaohele**	Nuhi	Jean Baptiste Rives	**Holau II**
**Makole (k)**	**Haupa (w)**	**Namahana Piia (w)**	**Gideon Peleioholani Laanui**; 1797–1849 **né Laʻanui**	**Theresa Owana Kaheiheimalie Reeves**
Captain William Slocum Wilcox; 1814–1910	**Kalua**; 1836–1865	**Gideon Kailipalaki Laanui**; 1840–1871	Elizabeth Kamaikaopa	**Elizabeth Kekaʻaniau Laʻanui Pratt**; 1834–1928 **née Elizabeth Kekaʻaniau**
**Gina Sobrero-Wilcox**; 1863-1912 (**née Baroness Gina Sobrero**)	**Robert William Kalanihiapo Wilcox** (February 15, 1855 - October 23, 1903) (Note: Historical Dictionary of the Gilded Age lists Wilcox's full birth and death dating.)	**Theresa Owana Kaʻohelelani Laʻanui**	Alexander Joy Cartwright III	Elmer Miller (Note: Marriage license of Jno K. Kilioe Miller to Virginia K. Wilcox list E.O Miller as father and Makalike as mother of Jno. (Note: "E.O.Miller". Family Search. Territory of Hawaii. Marriage license of Jno Miller to Virginia K. Wilcox - E. O. Miller in entry for Jno. K. Miller and Virginia K. Wilcox, 11 Jun 1916; citing Honolulu, Honolulu, Hawaii, reference 12495B; FHL microfilm 1,711,737))	Makalike
**Robert Kalanikupuapaikalaninui Keōua Wilcox**	Helen Kaleipuanani Simerson Wilburton	John Kilioe Miller; May 26, 1896 - April 20, 1969 (Note: United States World War I Draft Registration Cards, 1917-1918. (Note: "John K. Miller". Family Search. Territory of Hawaii.Draft card - John K Miller, 1917-1918; citing Honolulu City no 1, Hawaii, United States, NARA microfilm publication M1509 (Washington D.C.: National Archives and Records Administration, n.d.); FHL microfilm 1,452,096))	**Virginia Kahoa Kaʻahumanu Kaihikapumahana Wilcox** (Note: Hawaii Marriages, 1826-1922.)	**Elizabeth Kaʻakaualaninui Wilcox**	Daisy Emmalani Napulahaokalani Cartwright	Eva Kuwailanimamao Cartwright
Henry Mario Salazar	**Helena Kalokuokamaile Wilcox Salazar-Machado**; April 13, 1917 – September 17, 1988 (née Wilcox)	Henry Machado, Sr.
**Henry C. Keaweikekahialiiokamoku Salazar**	**Paul C. Kalokuokamaile Salazar**	**Michael Carl Kauhiokalani Salazar**	**Stephen Craig Laanui Salazar**	**Owana Kaohelelani Mahealani-Rose Salazar**
