= Theresa Laʻanui =

Hawaiian royal (1860–1944)

Theresa Owana Kaʻohelelani Laʻanui
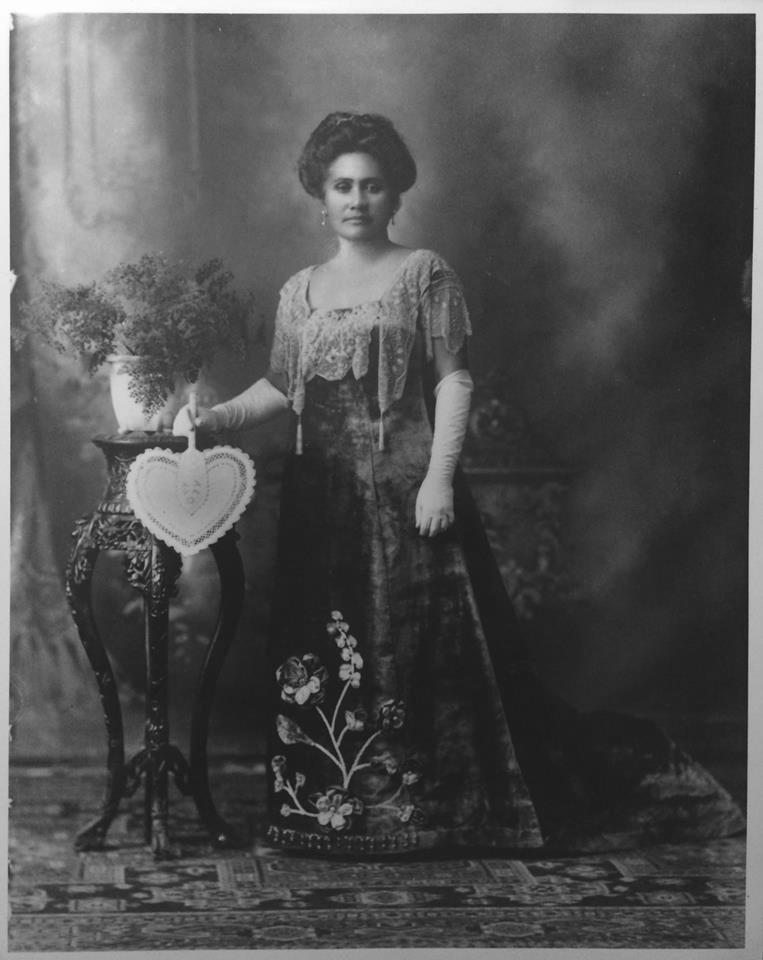
- Born: May 1, 1860; Honolulu, Oahu, Kingdom of Hawaiʻi
- Died: January 5, 1944 (aged 83); The Queen's Hospital, Honolulu, Territory of Hawaii, U.S.
- Burial: Puea Cemetery, Kalihi; Later removed to Nuʻuanu Cemetery
- Spouse: Alexander Cartwright III; Robert W. Wilcox; Lewis R. Belliveau; John G. Kelly
- Issue: Eva Cartwright Styne; Daisy Cartwright Nelson; Robert Keōua Wilcox; Virginia Wilcox Miller; Elizabeth Kaʻakaualaninui Wilcox
- House: House of Laʻanui
- Father: Gideon Kailipalaki Laʻanui
- Mother: Elizabeth Kamaikaopa

Theresa Owana Kaʻōhelelani Laʻanui (May 1, 1860 – January 5, 1944) was a descendant of Kalokuokamaile, the eldest brother of Kamehameha I. She was a member of the House of Laʻanui, a collateral branch of the House of Kamehameha.

== Birth and early life ==
Theresa was born on May 1, 1860, in Honolulu. She was born of high aliʻi descent, through her father, Gideon Kailipalaki Laʻanui, a brother of Elizabeth Kekaʻaniau who attended the Chiefs Children's School and was deemed eligible to the throne by King Kamehameha III. Her mother was Elizabeth Kamaikaopa, said to be a great-granddaughter of Keohokalole, the mother of Liliuokalani. She was a member of the House of Laʻanui, a collateral branch of the House of Kamehameha. Her children (except her daughters by Cartwright) and male-line descendants belong paternally to the Wilcox family.

As a child, Theresa grew up during the royal court of Kamehameha V and would often go to the palace to make leis for the king. She was one-eighth French by her great-grandfather Jean Baptiste Rives, who had twin daughters both being hanai at birth by Kaahumanu. One of the twins was given the name Theresa Owana Kaheiheimalie, the grandmother and namesake of the later Theresa. Aside from this French ancestry, she was otherwise of Hawaiian descent. After her parents died in 1871, she was adopted by her aunt Elizabeth Kekaʻaniau Pratt.

== Marriage and children ==
She was married four times, although she only had children from her first and second marriages. She married firstly Alexander Joy Cartwright III, son of Honolulu businessman and baseball pioneer Alexander Cartwright II on April 23, 1878. She was married under the name Theresa Owana Rives. By this marriage she had two or three daughters, an unnamed daughter born in 1879, Eva Kuwailanimamao Cartwright (1881–1948) and Daisy Emmalani Napulahaokalani Cartwright (1885–1957) They divorced on April 5, 1883, and he eventually moved to San Francisco and married Susan Florence McDonald.

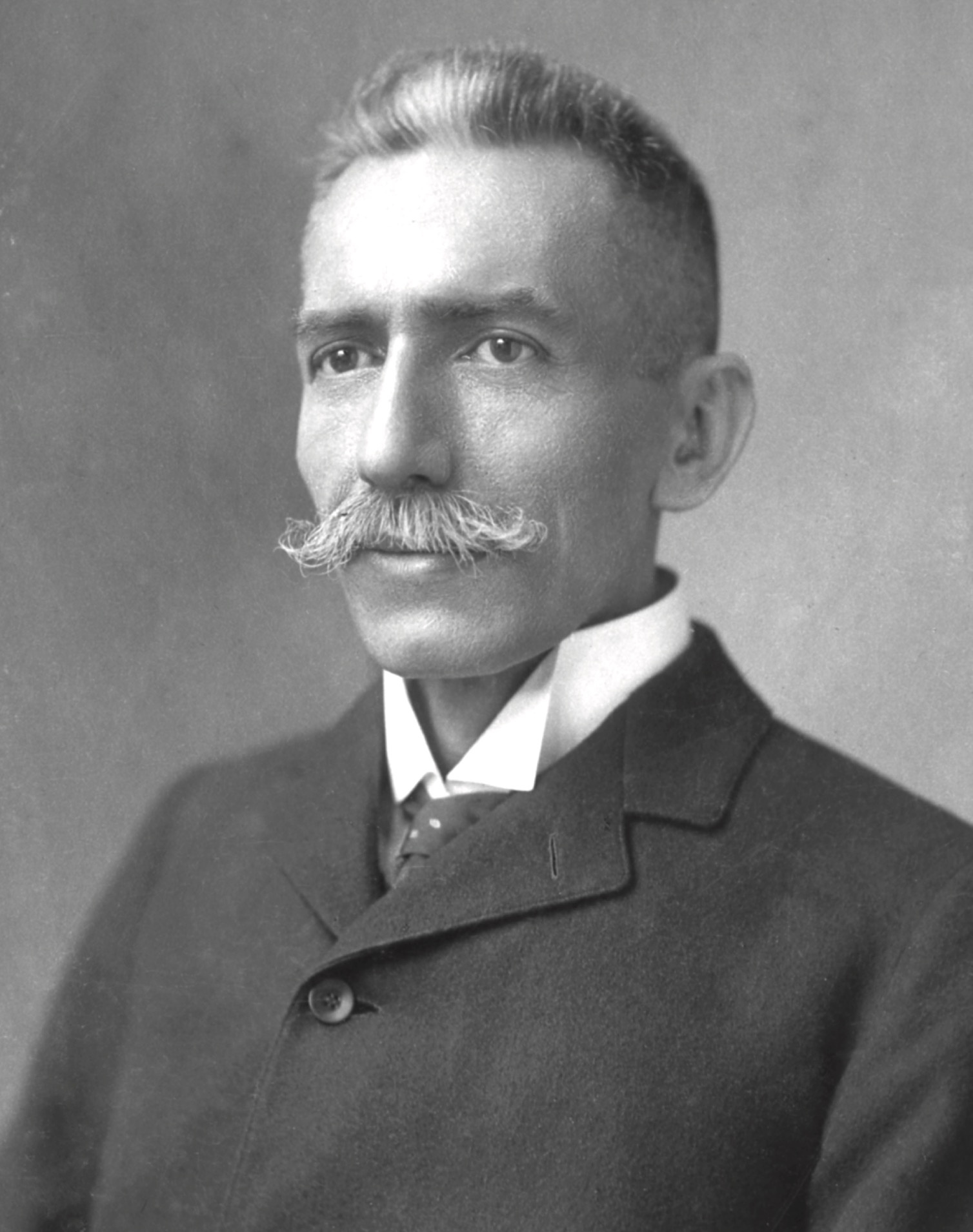
Robert William Wilcox Going to congress in 1900

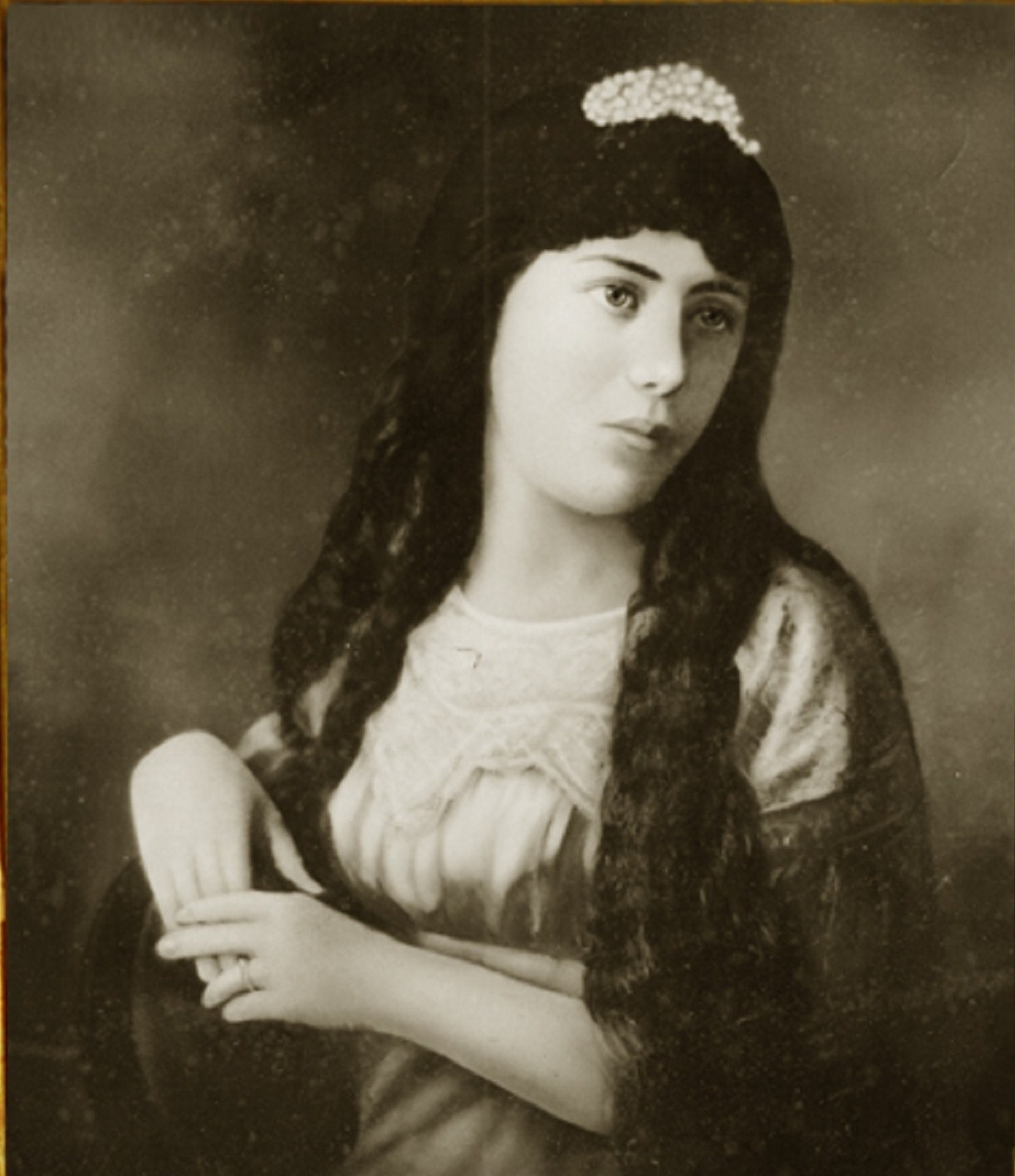
Daughter Virginia Kahoa Kaʻahumanu Kaihikapumahana

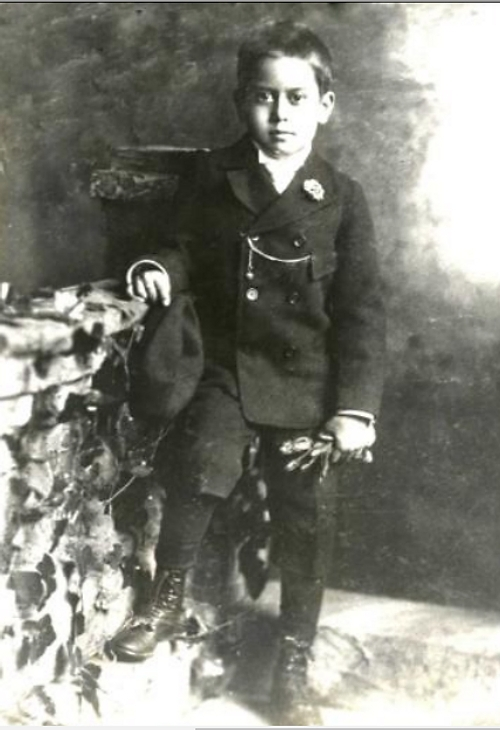
Son Robert Kalanikupuaikalaninui Keōua Wilcox

Her second marriage was on August 20, 1896 to Robert William Kalanihiapo Wilcox (1855–1903), a military leader who King Kalakaua sent to Italy at the Royal Military Academy in Turin and lead an unsuccessful attempt to restore Queen Lili`uokalani back to the throne. He then became a popular politician and was elected as the first U.S. Territory of Hawai`i Delegate to Congress. By this marriage she had a son, Robert Kalanikupuapaikalaninui Keōua Wilcox (1893–1934) and two daughters, Virginia Kahoa Kaʻahumanu Kaihikapumahana Wilcox (1895–1954) and Elizabeth Kaʻakaualaninui Wilcox who was born January 2, 1898, and died young November 24, 1898.

== First Lady, politics and business ==
Theresa and Robert Wilcox owned and operated two Hawaiian newspapers, the Liberal and the Home Rula Repubalika, which were written in both the Hawaiian language and English. Their Newspaper was an opposition to the oligarchy's newspaper the Hawaiian Gazette which was run by Alatau Atkinson, William Richards Castle, William Owen Smith, Sandford Dole and Lorrin Thurston, and they were the conspirators who overthrew Queen Lili`uokalani. The Gazette later merged with the Advertiser, combining the voice of their occupied government as their newspaper was a mechanism to promote their regime through journalism. Their oligarchy newspaper promoted an "all white" territorial government of Hawai`i while the Wilcox's newspaper promoted the voting rights for Hawaiians to be restored. The Wilcox's husband and wife team became a thorn in the side of the oligarchs, as Theresa and her aunt had a claim for the ceded crown lands which was held in control under the new regime and because of Roberts counter revolution against them to restore the queen, then with the publishing of the Home Rula Repubalika, the Wilcox's were definitely considered a threat. Victory came in the year 1900 when Theresa's husband Robert Wilcox was supported by many Hawaiians and they voted for him to be the first U.S. Territory of Hawai`i Delegate to Congress. This was considered a major win for Hawaiians since all other attempts to restore the monarchy had failed.

Because of her relation to the royal family, she was famously known by many as Princess Theresa. She was received at the White House during Wilcox's term from 1900 to 1903 and attended the Inauguration of U.S. President McKinley as well as the Inauguration Ball where she met McKinley and his wife. She had left the ball with U.S. vice president, Theodore Roosevelt to get something to eat because the snacks of sherbet and punch was to slim for her Hawaiian appetite. After the death of her husband Robert Wilcox in 1903, she remained active in Hawai`i politics and made national news, she was called upon by many, such as Queen Dowager Margherita of Savoy, Prince Ferdinando, Duke of Genoa and the Chinese Consul, Chang Tso Fan during a reception on New Years Day. She was a master in coordinating luau's for events and political parties some attended by Liliuokalani, she was known for her large luau's at her Kaimuki home which was called "Luauville" because of it. She started her own Pa'u riding club and a hula entertainment business.

== Queen Liliʻuokalani's alleged forged will and conspiracies ==
When Queen Liliʻuokalani died on November 11, 1917, two controversial wills of her estate were being presented for probate, the first one, a trust deed which was executed on December 2, 1909, was already in litigation for several years by Prince Kuhio. He filed a lawsuit against the trustees on November 30, 1915, for an annulment of the 1909 trust deed as being a result of a conspiracy on the part of Curtis Iaukea and John Aimoku Dominis. The other presented will dated on August 29, 1917, caused much debate of who would have immediate authority over Lili`uokalani's funeral services and her estate. The appointed trustees of the 1909 trust deed and Kuhio both objected to the second presented will of 1917, saying they would contest it. The 1917 will, said to be Lili`uokalani's last will and testament, divided her estate to Theresa and her two children, Elizabeth Keka`aniau, Prince David Kawananakoa and children, Aimoku Dominis and children, Fred Iaukea, Mrs Huchison, Curtis Iaukea, Mrs Lahilahi Webb, Mrs. Waikiki Heleluhe and daughter, Mrs. Kahae Aea, Mrs. Kahanuʻu Meek, Mrs Mary Auld, Mrs. Lilia Auld, Mrs. Laura Puhiula, Mrs. Kaahawelani and children, Mrs. Paakai Ulaula Bush and children, Mrs. Chas Guilick, Mrs. Ellen Dwight, Mrs. Anaole, Saint Andrews Cathedral, Leahi Home, Board of Health, Leper Colony Settlement, Lili`uokalani School, Wainee Church, Mrs. Hakanoaloha Mana, Mrs. Jennie Clark and Fred Beckley, (Presented at 840 a.m. November 19, 1917, clerks office), (#1142 Received and filed in the Supreme Court, Nov. 11, 1918, Robert Parker Jr., assistant clerk), Hawai`i State Archives.

Theresa claimed that the queen signed the will on August 29, 1917, in the presence of herself and two witnesses who were named on the will as James Kealoha and Kamakaia. John F Colburn, former manager and treasurer of Kapiolani's estate was the executor of the will, his lawyers brought in the witnesses to interrogate and examine them in separate rooms. The witnesses signed sworn affidavits under oath that they witnessed the queen signing the will, describing it in great detail and they were found to be telling the truth. Soon after, Kamakaia was paid a large sum of money ($900.00) by an unknown foreigner and suddenly changed his story and said he lied and that the queen did not sign the will. He said that Theresa told him what to say in exchange of a church and that god told him to tell the truth. After changing his statement, Theresa was being accused of forging the will, Theresa claimed that "they must have got to him" and that he is lying. The will was immediately withdrawn, but a conviction was needed to prevent it from ever surfacing again in probate. Theresa was then prosecuted by the Territorial Court for conspiracy of forgery and Kamakaia was to be the key witness for the prosecution. Theresa pleaded not guilty and in her defense, she claimed that "it was all a cover up" by her enemies and that the queen did not trust them. She further stated that upon Prince Kuhio's lawsuit against the trustees, the queen had asked to prepare another will so she may leave something for her and her children since they were related. It was stated that Iaukea said the queen wanted to execute a new will and she had already started drafting one in July. But Theresa was found guilty and in 1918, she was sentenced to three years of hard labor in prison for conspiracy in the first degree along with James Kealoha. Her sentence was commuted in June 1922, and she was released on parole from the territorial prison by Governor McCarthy. Her full civil rights were restored by Governor Farrington in his Christmas pardons in 1923. She continued to maintain her innocence throughout her life.

== Queen Liliuokalani's estate, next of kin claimants ==
Four other court cases surrounded Kuhio's lawsuit to dissolve Liliuokalani's trust and claim next of kin to the queen's estate. One was Theresa, the other three claimants were John Colburn, representing the Kawananakoa minors, Emma Defries and Mrs. Keawe Nawahie. Theresa claimed next of kin as a great-granddaughter of Keohokālole, Liliuokalani's mother, through her own mother Kamaikaopa. Theresa claimed that Keohokalole had four husbands, Kumimeheua was the first husband and Kapaakea the second. Kauahaka was the issue of Keohokalole and Kumimeheua. Kauahaka had a husband by the name of Kaukahele and born was Kamaikaopa who married Gideon Kailipalaki La`anui and had Theresa. Her aunt, Elizabeth Keka`aniau testified in court that it was true along with other testimony from her mother's sister and by elder Hawaiians. But without further sufficient evidence, the claim was dismissed by the Territorial Supreme Court. The other three claimants, John Colburn, for the Kawananakoa minors was ruled against and dropped out of court, Emma Defries and Mrs. Keawe Nawahie, were all dismissed by the Territorial Supreme Court for insufficient evidence as well. The trustees of Lili`uokalani's estate sued all three Theresa, Emma Defries and Nawahie, demanding to be re-reimbursed for court costs (First Judicial Circuit Court Territory of Hawaii, Filed April 2, 1919, Hawaii State Archives). Kuhio's case was settled out-of-court, in exchange of Kuhio dropping the suit, he was awarded the fee simple ownership of Kealohilani property and all his legal expenses were paid by the trustees, Washington Place was to be sold to the Territorial government.

Both the 1917 alleged forged will and the lawsuit of Prince Kuhio against the Lili`uokalani's trustees, delayed the distribution of the queen's estate up to six years. Lili`uokalani's 1909 trust deed was finally admitted to probate in 1923, The lawyer who recommended, drafted and assisted Liliuokalani to establish the trust was William O. Smith (one of the conspirators of the overthrow who drafted the "Bayonet Constitution") he was also one the trustees for her estate.

== Later life ==
In 1923, After Delegate Kuhio died, his widow received a pension from the U.S. Territory, Theresa claimed and petitioned to receive a pension also, stating that she was entitled as well because she was the widow of the first Delegate to Congress. Lorrin Thurston, agreed to her plead and represented her case with an article in his newspaper, the Advertiser. In support of her claim, he said that Theresa and Kuhio were both equal to the throne and that Theresa was a victim of circumstance and now she is in need of financial help as a widow of a delegate. The Territory agreed and Theresa received her monthly pension.

In 1936, Theresa's status as a member of the Kamehameha dynasty was called upon by Postmaster Wilson. The Postmaster received a postcard addressed to Kamehameha and did not know what to do with it, so he called on Princess Theresa to legally open the envelope. It was a request from a stamp collector in Pennsylvania asking to receive the new Kamehameha stamp. When the new Kamehameha stamps were issued, it broke national records in sales and 1000 stamps were endorsed by Princess Theresa. While endorsing the stamps, she wore her shell bracelet from Queen Ka`ahumanu and a brooch from Queen Emma in honor of the Kamehameha Dynasty.

In 1942, a huge luau was given for her birthday, some of the events were sponsored on the part of Mayor Petrie, endorsing the Royal Hawaiian Band to serenade her at her house on 7th avenue in Kaimuki where the celebration was held. Many friends and relatives called on her throughout the day and enjoyed the luau. The second grade students from Iolani School came to present her with leis. She was assisted by her daughters Eva Cartwright, Virginia Kapu Miller and her grand daughter, Helena Salazar, also her great-granddaughter, Victoria Kamamalu Shaw greeted the guests.

== Death and claims ==
On February 10, 1909, Theresa married Lewis R. Belliveau. and on January 16, 1922, she married John G. Kelly., divorcing both. She continued throughout her life to stake claims for the restoration of the monarchy and inheritance of the crown lands that were being held and used by the Territory of Hawaii. In her life story published in 1936, she claimed she may have been queen and that someday she would restore the rights of Hawaiians to their land. If she was awarded inheritance of the crown lands of Hawaii, she would give each family beach front to catch fish and lobster and gather seaweed, and a mountain property to raise pigs, chickens and taro, also building free schools and free hospitals in every district, all anybody could need and want. Today, her family continues to carry on her claims. Theresa Owana Ka`ohelelani died on January 5, 1944, at The Queen's Hospital and was buried at the Puea Cemetery in Kalihi., but was later removed and cremated.

== Family tree ==
Laʻanui, Wilcox, Salazar family tree

**Key: Subjects with bold titles and blue bold box = Aliʻi line. Bold title and grey bolded box = Lower ranking Aliʻi line. Bold title and un-bolded box = European nobility. Regular name and box = makaʻāinana or untitled foreign subject**.

**Keōua** (Note: Hawaiian Native Claims Settlement Study Commission, Exhibit B, Genealogy Descent from the Kamehameha Royal Family .)	Kahikikalaokalani	**Kekuʻiapoiwa II**
**Kalokuokamaile**	Kaloiokalani	**Kaʻahumanu**	**Kamehameha I**	**Kalākua Kaheiheimālie**
**Kaohele**	Nuhi	Jean Baptiste Rives	**Holau II**
**Makole (k)**	**Haupa (w)**	**Namahana Piia (w)**	**Gideon Peleioholani Laanui**; 1797–1849 **né Laʻanui**	**Theresa Owana Kaheiheimalie Reeves**
Captain William Slocum Wilcox; 1814–1910	**Kalua**; 1836–1865	**Gideon Kailipalaki Laanui**; 1840–1871	Elizabeth Kamaikaopa	**Elizabeth Kekaʻaniau Laʻanui Pratt**; 1834–1928 **née Elizabeth Kekaʻaniau**
**Gina Sobrero-Wilcox**; 1863-1912 (**née Baroness Gina Sobrero**)	**Robert William Kalanihiapo Wilcox** (February 15, 1855 - October 23, 1903) (Note: Historical Dictionary of the Gilded Age lists Wilcox's full birth and death dating.)	**Theresa Owana Kaʻohelelani Laʻanui**	Alexander Joy Cartwright III	Elmer Miller (Note: Marriage license of Jno K. Kilioe Miller to Virginia K. Wilcox list E.O Miller as father and Makalike as mother of Jno. (Note: "E.O.Miller". Family Search. Territory of Hawaii. Marriage license of Jno Miller to Virginia K. Wilcox - E. O. Miller in entry for Jno. K. Miller and Virginia K. Wilcox, 11 Jun 1916; citing Honolulu, Honolulu, Hawaii, reference 12495B; FHL microfilm 1,711,737))	Makalike
**Robert Kalanikupuapaikalaninui Keōua Wilcox**	Helen Kaleipuanani Simerson Wilburton	John Kilioe Miller; May 26, 1896 - April 20, 1969 (Note: United States World War I Draft Registration Cards, 1917-1918. (Note: "John K. Miller". Family Search. Territory of Hawaii.Draft card - John K Miller, 1917-1918; citing Honolulu City no 1, Hawaii, United States, NARA microfilm publication M1509 (Washington D.C.: National Archives and Records Administration, n.d.); FHL microfilm 1,452,096))	**Virginia Kahoa Kaʻahumanu Kaihikapumahana Wilcox** (Note: Hawaii Marriages, 1826-1922.)	**Elizabeth Kaʻakaualaninui Wilcox**	Daisy Emmalani Napulahaokalani Cartwright	Eva Kuwailanimamao Cartwright
Henry Mario Salazar	**Helena Kalokuokamaile Wilcox Salazar-Machado**; April 13, 1917 – September 17, 1988 (née Wilcox)	Henry Machado, Sr.
**Henry C. Keaweikekahialiiokamoku Salazar**	**Paul C. Kalokuokamaile Salazar**	**Michael Carl Kauhiokalani Salazar**	**Stephen Craig Laanui Salazar**	**Owana Kaohelelani Mahealani-Rose Salazar**

== Bibliography ==
- McKinzie, Edith Kawelohea (1983). Stagner, Ishmael W. (ed.). Hawaiian Genealogies: Extracted from Hawaiian Language Newspapers. Vol. 1. Honolulu: University of Hawaii Press. ISBN 0-939154-28-5. OCLC 12555087.
- Thrum, Thomas G., ed. (1919). "Hawaiian Almanac and Annual for 1919". Honolulu: Honolulu Star-Bulletin.
