= Jean Baptiste Rives =

- Born: c. 1793
- Died: August 18, 1833
- Other names: John Reeves; Luahine
- Known for: Royal secretary of Kingdom of Hawaii
- Spouse: Holau
- Children: Virginia Kahoa; Theresa Owana; John Lafayette

Jean-Baptiste Jassont Lafayette Rives (French pronunciation: [ʒɑ̃ batist ʒasɔ̃ lafajɛt ʁiv]; 1793–1833) was a French adventurer who served in the court of the Kingdom of Hawaii. His name was sometimes spelled John Reeves by English speakers. Some sources give other middle names.

== Life ==
Jean Baptiste Rives was born in the city of Bordeaux (part of the region of Gascony) c. 1793. He arrived in the Hawaiian Islands sometime between 1803 and 1810, probably as a cabin boy or steward, given his youth. He must have had an ear for learning new languages, since he spoke at least French and English, and picked up the Hawaiian language quickly. About the same age as the sons of King Kamehameha I, he became a close friend of the boys and became useful as an interpreter for the growing number of foreign visitors. The Royal teacher John Papa ʻĪʻī had him give the princes language lessons. His short stature earned him the Hawaiian language nickname Luahine ("Old Woman").

== Rise to favor ==
When Prince Liholiho became King as Kamehameha II in May 1819, Rives became part of his "inner circle"; he was his personal secretary and a binge drinking companion. Rives was granted land on four different islands.

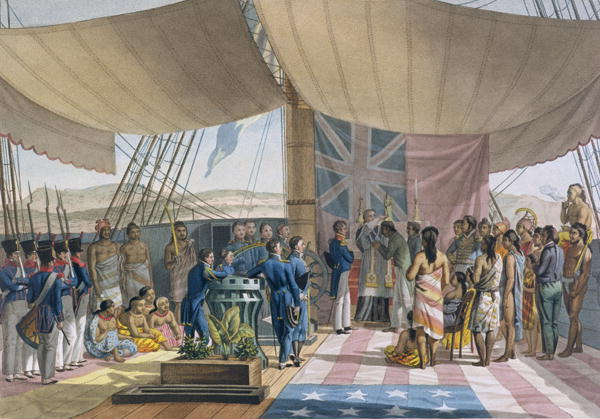
Baptism on Uranie in 1819

On August 8, 1819, the French explorer Louis de Freycinet (1779–1842) arrived on the ship Uranie, and Rives acted as interpreter. On August 12, the ship chaplain Abbé de Quélen performed a Roman Catholic baptism ceremony on the chief minister Kalanimoku, and on August 27 island Governor Boki. Rives tried to convince others to join the ceremony, but people who would often plunge into the Pacific found it hard to believe a spoonful of water had much power.

Jacques Arago describes Rives as a curious sight: he was under four feet tall, at a time when native Hawaiians were much taller than even average height Europeans. Rives was wearing an elegant silk robe that had to be tied up because it was far too large. Although Rives boasted of having sailed to China several times, being the son of a famous physician and curing the natives with his medicines, the fellow Gascons of the crew were embarrassed by his claims. In his journal, Arago says:

"...his fibs, if he told them with better grace and adroitness, would be the only indication by which you could guess what countryman he was."

When the first Protestant missionaries arrived in March 1820, Rives advised the king to send them away. However, the Queen Regent Kaʻahumanu and other chiefs were convinced by the British advisor John Young and some Hawaiians on the ship to let them stay. The religious tension between different denominations of Christians would be a long-lasting conflict.

The king appointed Rives as appointed captain of the royal yacht Cleopatra's Barge after its purchase in January 1821, but probably served in only an honorary capacity since he was not known for his maritime skills. About 1822, Rives opened one of the first hotels in Honolulu, and ran a grog shop in the hotel.

Rives had several children while in Hawaii with Holau, his Hawaiian wife of noble birth. Their twin daughters were Theresa Owana Kaheiheimalie Rives (1815–1850) and Virginia Kahoa Kaʻahumanu Rives (1815-after 1869?), followed by a son John Lafayette Rives (1822-after 1869?). Queen Kaʻahumanu adopted these girls and raised them as princesses. Gideon Peleioholani Laʻanui married Theresa. Virginia first married an American, Henry Augustus Peirce, and had a son Henry E. Pierce (born 1833) with him. Since there were no official records kept in this era, the legitimacy claim became a notable court case when H.A. Peirce returned almost 40 years later. Virginia divorced Peirce in 1837 and moved to Siberia. There she married a Russian.

== Back to Europe ==
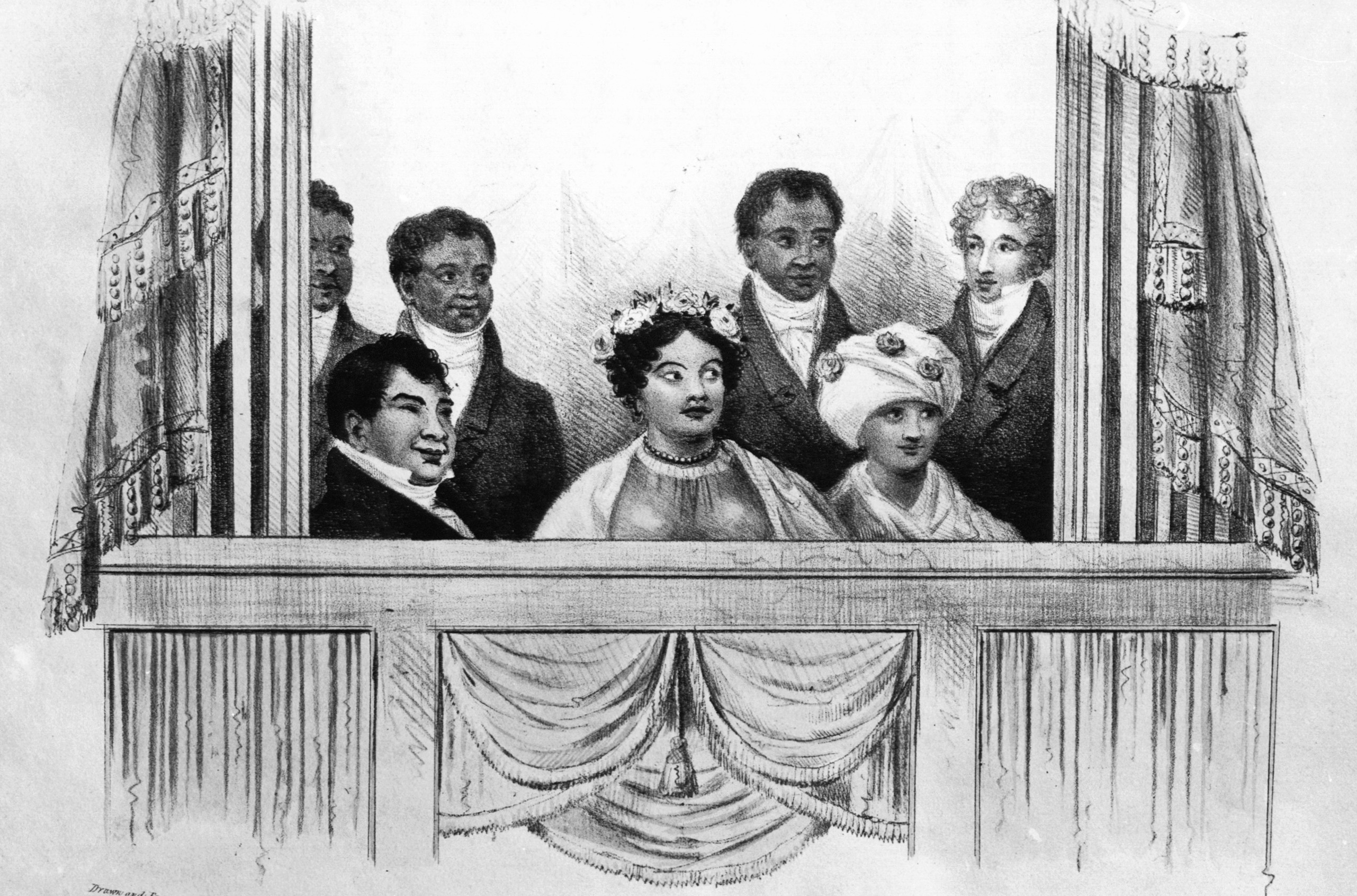
In the royal box at London, 1824

Rives was one of the party chosen by Kamehameha II to take the ship L'Aigle (French for "The Eagle") under Captain Valentine Starbuck on a state visit to London in November 1823. The English missionary William Ellis wanted to return to England and act as interpreter, and offered to pay for his own passage, but Rives convinced Starbuck to select him instead.

While waiting for the royal audience, the king, queen, and other members of the court contracted measles and all died. Rives wrote a letter to Kalanimoku giving official notice of the death of the king, which was printed in the English newspapers. He accompanied the royal bodies to St Martin-in-the-Fields church where they awaited transportation back to Hawaii. It would be one of his last official acts.

The royal entourage had left with $25,000 in their treasure chest, but only $10,000 remained by the time they arrived in London. Rives was suspected of taking or spending the funds, perhaps with Captain Starbuck as accomplice, who quickly departed. With so many of the royal court dead, Rives likely realized his services were no longer wanted. Another theory was he wanted to visit relatives; for whatever reason, he did not accompany the surviving members of the court on HMS Blonde on their way back to Hawaii on September 8, 1824. John Young's son, James Kānehoa, took over official duties as interpreter.

Rives tried to convince investors in London to partner with him in a business venture, but found no takers. He went to Paris, where he claimed still to represent the Kingdom of Hawaii. He raised financing in early 1826 from the banker Jacques Laffitte and other investors, including the Javal family, to form a joint stock company to profit from trade with Hawaii. He also signed a treaty with the French government too guarantee his firm favorable trading rights. They did not trust Rives with overall management of the expedition, so hired Captain Auguste Bernard Duhaut-Cilly (1790–1849) as commander. They sailed from Le Havre on Le Héros on April 10, 1826, to Alta California. The French were more interested in exploiting the vast western coast of North American than isolated Pacific islands.

== Later years and death ==
Le Héros arrived March 29, 1827, at Santa Barbara, California, under the Spanish commander José de la Guerra y Noriega. They proceeded to Monterey, and were surprised to see another ship flying a French flag. While in Paris, Rives had asked for Catholic missionaries to be sent to Hawaii, and promised to fund the Church after they arrived. Eventually word reached Pope Leo XII, who appointed Alexis Bachelot of the Congregation of the Sacred Hearts of Jesus and Mary to lead the group; they left France November 21, 1826, on La Comète under command of Captain Plassard. when they arrived in Hawaii in July 1827, the missionaries learned they were not wanted in Hawaii. Plassard was told to take the passengers away but, his contract fulfilled, he departed without them. Duhaut-Cilly and Rives encountered La Comète in Monterey, and, hearing the story of the Hawaiian rejection, the senior Frenchman had more doubts about Rives.

They returned to Santa Barbara, where on September 13, 1827, they met the schooner Waverly under Captain William Sumner; it had sailed from Hawaii. They chartered the Waverly for Rives to engage in trade along the Pacific Northwest coast and planned a rendez-vous with Duhaut-Cilly next summer. In October, Duhaut-Cilly left for Peru on Le Héros. He returned to Monterey from his trading expedition in July 1828. While waiting for Rives, he grew impatient, and started loading horses on board to sell in Hawaii. When the Waverley finally returned in late September to Monterey to meet Duhaut-Cilly, Rives was not on board.

From Captain Sumner and Rives' letters, he discovered Rives had gone south to Mexico and lost all his cargo "in consequence of his imprudent conduct and his incapacity." When Duhaut-Cilly finally arrived in the Hawaiian island, he learned that the general opinion of Rives was negative. In his absence, his lands were given to others.

Rives died August 18, 1833, in Mexico, never seeing his family nor Hawaii again.

== Family tree ==
Laʻanui, Wilcox, Salazar family tree

**Key: Subjects with bold titles and blue bold box = Aliʻi line. Bold title and grey bolded box = Lower ranking Aliʻi line. Bold title and un-bolded box = European nobility. Regular name and box = makaʻāinana or untitled foreign subject**.

**Keōua** (Note: Hawaiian Native Claims Settlement Study Commission, Exhibit B, Genealogy Descent from the Kamehameha Royal Family .) | Kahikikalaokalani | **Kekuʻiapoiwa II**
**Kalokuokamaile** | Kaloiokalani | **Kaʻahumanu** | **Kamehameha I** | **Kalākua Kaheiheimālie**
**Kaohele** | Nuhi | Jean Baptiste Rives | **Holau II**
**Makole (k)** | **Haupa (w)** | **Namahana Piia (w)** | **Gideon Peleioholani Laanui**; 1797–1849 **né Laʻanui** | **Theresa Owana Kaheiheimalie Reeves**
Captain William Slocum Wilcox; 1814–1910 | **Kalua**; 1836–1865 | **Gideon Kailipalaki Laanui**; 1840–1871 | Elizabeth Kamaikaopa | **Elizabeth Kekaʻaniau Laʻanui Pratt**; 1834–1928 **née Elizabeth Kekaʻaniau**
**Gina Sobrero-Wilcox**; 1863-1912 (**née Baroness Gina Sobrero**) | **Robert William Kalanihiapo Wilcox** (February 15, 1855 - October 23, 1903) (Note: Historical Dictionary of the Gilded Age lists Wilcox's full birth and death dating.) | **Theresa Owana Kaʻohelelani Laʻanui** | Alexander Joy Cartwright III | Elmer Miller (Note: Marriage license of Jno K. Kilioe Miller to Virginia K. Wilcox list E.O Miller as father and Makalike as mother of Jno. (Note: "E.O.Miller". Family Search. Territory of Hawaii. Marriage license of Jno Miller to Virginia K. Wilcox - E. O. Miller in entry for Jno. K. Miller and Virginia K. Wilcox, 11 Jun 1916; citing Honolulu, Honolulu, Hawaii, reference 12495B; FHL microfilm 1,711,737)) | Makalike
**Robert Kalanikupuapaikalaninui Keōua Wilcox** | Helen Kaleipuanani Simerson Wilburton | John Kilioe Miller; May 26, 1896 - April 20, 1969 (Note: United States World War I Draft Registration Cards, 1917-1918. (Note: "John K. Miller". Family Search. Territory of Hawaii.Draft card - John K Miller, 1917-1918; citing Honolulu City no 1, Hawaii, United States, NARA microfilm publication M1509 (Washington D.C.: National Archives and Records Administration, n.d.); FHL microfilm 1,452,096)) | **Virginia Kahoa Kaʻahumanu Kaihikapumahana Wilcox** (Note: Hawaii Marriages, 1826-1922.) | **Elizabeth Kaʻakaualaninui Wilcox** | Daisy Emmalani Napulahaokalani Cartwright | Eva Kuwailanimamao Cartwright
Henry Mario Salazar | **Helena Kalokuokamaile Wilcox Salazar-Machado**; April 13, 1917 – September 17, 1988 (née Wilcox) | Henry Machado, Sr.
**Henry C. Keaweikekahialiiokamoku Salazar** | **Paul C. Kalokuokamaile Salazar** | **Michael Carl Kauhiokalani Salazar** | **Stephen Craig Laanui Salazar** | **Owana Kaohelelani Mahealani-Rose Salazar**
