= Princess Helena =

Princess Helena may refer to:

- Princess Helena of Nassau (1831–1888), daughter of William, Duke of Nassau and wife of George Victor, Prince of Waldeck and Pyrmont
- Princess Helena of the United Kingdom (1846–1923), the fifth child and third daughter of Queen Victoria
- Princess Helena of Waldeck and Pyrmont (1861–1922), daughter of George Victor of Waldeck-Pyrmont and wife of Prince Leopold, Duke of Albany
- Princess Helena Victoria of Schleswig-Holstein (1870–1948), daughter of Princess Helena of the United Kingdom
- Princess Helena of Serbia (1884–1962), daughter of King Peter I of Serbia
- Princess Helena Adelaide of Schleswig-Holstein-Sonderburg-Glücksburg (1888–1962), daughter of Friedrich Ferdinand, Duke of Schleswig-Holstein
- Princess Helena of Waldeck and Pyrmont (1899–1948), daughter of Friedrich, Prince of Waldeck and Pyrmont and wife of Nikolaus, Hereditary Grand Duke of Oldenburg
- Helena Kalokuokamaile Wilcox, Princess Helena Kalokuokamaile Keoua Wilcox Salazar-Mach, (1917–1988)
- Lady Helena Gibbs (1888–1969), born Princess Helena of Teck
