= Kaʻōhelelani =

Kaʻōhelelani or Kaʻōhele was a Hawaiian chiefess in the early Kingdom of Hawaii.

== Life ==
She was born in the District of Hāna on the island of Maui in the mid to late 18th century. Her mother was High Chiefess Kaloiokalani of the royal family of Kahikinui and Honuaula (southern Maui). Her father was Kalokuokamaile, older half-brother of Kamehameha I who later unified the Hawaiian Islands in to found the Kingdom of Hawaii; both were sons of Keōua Kalanikupuapaikalaninui. Her father was the High Chief of Hāna, Kipahulu and Kaupo.

Her parents named her Kaʻōhelelani, and she was their only child. She was verging into maidenhood when her father died. His people showed their affection for him by making his grave on the highest peak of their country, Kauwiki. Upon news of his death reaching his brother Kamehameha, he immediately assembled a retinue of followers and retainers to accompany his brother Kealiimaikai to bear his request to Kaloiokalani to permit her daughter Kaʻōhelelani to take up her residence at his court, and to have his brother take charge of the vast patrimonial estate until Kaʻōhelelani should reach her majority.

As Kaʻōhelelani approached maturity Kamehameha was looking for a matrimonial alliance for his niece. As the Waimea people, under the rule of their high chief Hinai, had shown reluctance to submit to him, Kamehameha united the ruling families through an offer of the hand of his niece to Nuhi, the eldest son of Hinau. This offer was accepted and soon Kaohele was transported to her new home in Waimea.

Kamehameha was sorely disappointed in his expectations. Kaʻōhelelani became attached to her new home and family, but the anticipated peace between the two families was not realized. Possibly she felt resentment toward Kamehameha, since after he conquered Maui king Kalanikupule, he gave her former land to the chiefs who aided him.

Nuhi and Kaʻōhelelani had a daughter Kekaikuihala and then a son Gideon Peleioholani Laanui.

== Family tree ==
Laʻanui, Wilcox, Salazar family tree

**Key: Subjects with bold titles and blue bold box = Aliʻi line. Bold title and grey bolded box = Lower ranking Aliʻi line. Bold title and un-bolded box = European nobility. Regular name and box = makaʻāinana or untitled foreign subject**.

**Keōua** (Note: Hawaiian Native Claims Settlement Study Commission, Exhibit B, Genealogy Descent from the Kamehameha Royal Family .)	Kahikikalaokalani	**Kekuʻiapoiwa II**
**Kalokuokamaile**	Kaloiokalani	**Kaʻahumanu**	**Kamehameha I**	**Kalākua Kaheiheimālie**
**Kaohele**	Nuhi	Jean Baptiste Rives	**Holau II**
**Makole (k)**	**Haupa (w)**	**Namahana Piia (w)**	**Gideon Peleioholani Laanui**; 1797–1849 **né Laʻanui**	**Theresa Owana Kaheiheimalie Reeves**
Captain William Slocum Wilcox; 1814–1910	**Kalua**; 1836–1865	**Gideon Kailipalaki Laanui**; 1840–1871	Elizabeth Kamaikaopa	**Elizabeth Kekaʻaniau Laʻanui Pratt**; 1834–1928 **née Elizabeth Kekaʻaniau**
**Gina Sobrero-Wilcox**; 1863-1912 (**née Baroness Gina Sobrero**)	**Robert William Kalanihiapo Wilcox** (February 15, 1855 - October 23, 1903) (Note: Historical Dictionary of the Gilded Age lists Wilcox's full birth and death dating.)	**Theresa Owana Kaʻohelelani Laʻanui**	Alexander Joy Cartwright III	Elmer Miller (Note: Marriage license of Jno K. Kilioe Miller to Virginia K. Wilcox list E.O Miller as father and Makalike as mother of Jno. (Note: "E.O.Miller". Family Search. Territory of Hawaii. Marriage license of Jno Miller to Virginia K. Wilcox - E. O. Miller in entry for Jno. K. Miller and Virginia K. Wilcox, 11 Jun 1916; citing Honolulu, Honolulu, Hawaii, reference 12495B; FHL microfilm 1,711,737))	Makalike
**Robert Kalanikupuapaikalaninui Keōua Wilcox**	Helen Kaleipuanani Simerson Wilburton	John Kilioe Miller; May 26, 1896 - April 20, 1969 (Note: United States World War I Draft Registration Cards, 1917-1918. (Note: "John K. Miller". Family Search. Territory of Hawaii.Draft card - John K Miller, 1917-1918; citing Honolulu City no 1, Hawaii, United States, NARA microfilm publication M1509 (Washington D.C.: National Archives and Records Administration, n.d.); FHL microfilm 1,452,096))	**Virginia Kahoa Kaʻahumanu Kaihikapumahana Wilcox** (Note: Hawaii Marriages, 1826-1922.)	**Elizabeth Kaʻakaualaninui Wilcox**	Daisy Emmalani Napulahaokalani Cartwright	Eva Kuwailanimamao Cartwright
Henry Mario Salazar	**Helena Kalokuokamaile Wilcox Salazar-Machado**; April 13, 1917 – September 17, 1988 (née Wilcox)	Henry Machado, Sr.
**Henry C. Keaweikekahialiiokamoku Salazar**	**Paul C. Kalokuokamaile Salazar**	**Michael Carl Kauhiokalani Salazar**	**Stephen Craig Laanui Salazar**	**Owana Kaohelelani Mahealani-Rose Salazar**
