= Gideon Kailipalaki Laʻanui =

Member of the royal House of Laʻanui

- Born: April 1840; Laʻanui Estate, Waialua, Oahu
- Died: July 26, 1871 (aged 31); Honolulu, Oahu
- Spouse: Elizabeth Kamaikaopa
- Issue: Theresa Owana Kaohelelani Laʻanui
Names
- Gideon Kailipalaki-o-Keheananui Laʻanui
- House: House of Laʻanui
- Father: High Chief Gideon Peleioholani Laʻanui
- Mother: High Chiefess Theresa Owana Kaheiheimalie Rives

Gideon Kailipalaki-o-Kinaʻu Keheananui Laʻanui (1840–1871) was a great grandnephew of Kamehameha the Great, being a great grandson of Kalokuokamaile, the eldest brother of Kamehameha the Great. He was a member of the royal House of Laʻanui, a collateral branch of the House of Kamehameha.

== Life ==
He was born in January 1840 at the home of his father's Waialua estate. He was named Gideon after his father Gideon Laʻanui I, and Kailipalakai o Kinaʻu Keheananui, after High Chief Kinau II, his name was given because he used to brush the skin of Kinaʻu with a brush, reviling Dr. Judd which almost caused his death. His older sister Elizabeth Kekaʻaniau attended the Chiefs' Children's School, a select school exclusive for the children of the highest rank in the kingdom, eligible to be rulers. Under an official order of King Kamehameha III, she was proclaimed eligible to rule the Hawaiian Kingdom. He was too young to attend, and the school closed in 1849. However, Gideon attended the day school (also called Royal School) ran by Rev. Edward G. Beckwith with the future monarchs Kalākaua and Liliuokalani. He and his sister Elizabeth were only part native Hawaiian (hapa) with the same amount of Hawaiian blood as Queen Emma because their mother Theresa Owana Kaheiheimalie Rives was half French, daughter of Kamehameha II's French secretary Jean Baptiste Rives.

He became overseer of the royal properties on the island of Oʻahu and supplier of food for the royal court. By his marriage to Elizabeth Kamaikaopa Ka-o-paikawekiu-o-kalani July 12, 1859, they had one daughter, Theresa Owana Kaohelelani Laʻanui (1860–1944). It was reported that Gideon killed his wife (who was known for her beauty) with a pickaxe, but his high status prevented any legal action. Laʻanui died July 26, 1871, at the age of 31.

== Family ==
=== Ancestry ===
Ancestors of Gideon Kailipalaki Laʻanui

16. Kauameaino, High Chief of Waimea
8. Hinai, High Chief of Waimea
17. High Chiefess Kamakea
4. Nuhi, High Chief of Waimea
9. High Chiefess Kupapa-a-i
2. High Chief Gideon Pele'īoholani Laʻanui
20. High Chief Keoua Kalanikupuapaikalaninui
10. Kalokuokamaile, High Chief of Hana
21. Kahikikalāokalani, High Chiefess of Hana
5. High Chiefess Ka'ōhelelani
11. High Chiefess Kaloiokalani
1. **Gideon Kailipalakīokaheananui Laʻanui**
6. Jean Jassont Lafayette Rives
3. High Chiefess Theresa Owana Kaheiheimalie Rives
28. High Chief Kuluwahi
14. High Chief Kalawaia
29. High Chiefess Poʻu
7. High Chiefess Holau
15. High Chiefess Umimahihelelima

=== Family tree ===
Laʻanui, Wilcox, Salazar family tree

**Key: Subjects with bold titles and blue bold box = Aliʻi line. Bold title and grey bolded box = Lower ranking Aliʻi line. Bold title and un-bolded box = European nobility. Regular name and box = makaʻāinana or untitled foreign subject**.

**Keōua** (Note: Hawaiian Native Claims Settlement Study Commission, Exhibit B, Genealogy Descent from the Kamehameha Royal Family .)	Kahikikalaokalani	**Kekuʻiapoiwa II**
**Kalokuokamaile**	Kaloiokalani	**Kaʻahumanu**	**Kamehameha I**	**Kalākua Kaheiheimālie**
**Kaohele**	Nuhi	Jean Baptiste Rives	**Holau II**
**Makole (k)**	**Haupa (w)**	**Namahana Piia (w)**	**Gideon Peleioholani Laanui**; 1797–1849 **né Laʻanui**	**Theresa Owana Kaheiheimalie Reeves**
Captain William Slocum Wilcox; 1814–1910	**Kalua**; 1836–1865	**Gideon Kailipalaki Laanui**; 1840–1871	Elizabeth Kamaikaopa	**Elizabeth Kekaʻaniau Laʻanui Pratt**; 1834–1928 **née Elizabeth Kekaʻaniau**
**Gina Sobrero-Wilcox**; 1863-1912 (**née Baroness Gina Sobrero**)	**Robert William Kalanihiapo Wilcox** (February 15, 1855 - October 23, 1903) (Note: Historical Dictionary of the Gilded Age lists Wilcox's full birth and death dating.)	**Theresa Owana Kaʻohelelani Laʻanui**	Alexander Joy Cartwright III	Elmer Miller (Note: Marriage license of Jno K. Kilioe Miller to Virginia K. Wilcox list E.O Miller as father and Makalike as mother of Jno. (Note: "E.O.Miller". Family Search. Territory of Hawaii. Marriage license of Jno Miller to Virginia K. Wilcox - E. O. Miller in entry for Jno. K. Miller and Virginia K. Wilcox, 11 Jun 1916; citing Honolulu, Honolulu, Hawaii, reference 12495B; FHL microfilm 1,711,737))	Makalike
**Robert Kalanikupuapaikalaninui Keōua Wilcox**	Helen Kaleipuanani Simerson Wilburton	John Kilioe Miller; May 26, 1896 - April 20, 1969 (Note: United States World War I Draft Registration Cards, 1917-1918. (Note: "John K. Miller". Family Search. Territory of Hawaii.Draft card - John K Miller, 1917-1918; citing Honolulu City no 1, Hawaii, United States, NARA microfilm publication M1509 (Washington D.C.: National Archives and Records Administration, n.d.); FHL microfilm 1,452,096))	**Virginia Kahoa Kaʻahumanu Kaihikapumahana Wilcox** (Note: Hawaii Marriages, 1826-1922.)	**Elizabeth Kaʻakaualaninui Wilcox**	Daisy Emmalani Napulahaokalani Cartwright	Eva Kuwailanimamao Cartwright
Henry Mario Salazar	**Helena Kalokuokamaile Wilcox Salazar-Machado**; April 13, 1917 – September 17, 1988 (née Wilcox)	Henry Machado, Sr.
**Henry C. Keaweikekahialiiokamoku Salazar**	**Paul C. Kalokuokamaile Salazar**	**Michael Carl Kauhiokalani Salazar**	**Stephen Craig Laanui Salazar**	**Owana Kaohelelani Mahealani-Rose Salazar**
