= Owana Salazar =

Hawaiian musician (born 1953)

Owana Kaʻōhelelani Laʻanui Salazar
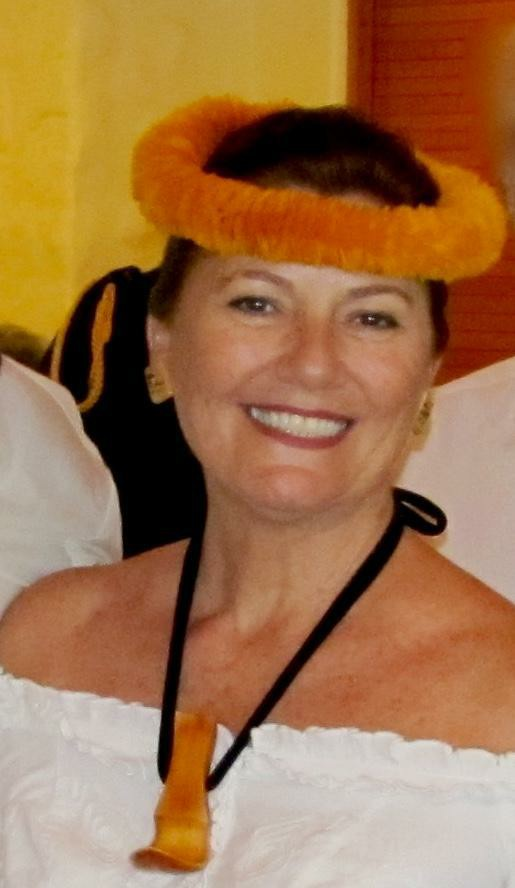
- Salazar in 1990

Head of the Royal House of Hawaii (disputed)
- tenure: September 17, 1988 - present
- Predecessor: Helena Kalokuokamaile Wilcox
- Heir apparent: Noa Kalokuokamaile
- Born: Owana Kaʻōhelelani Mahealani-Rose Salazar; 30 October 1953 (age 72); Honolulu, Territory of Hawaii, United States
- Issue: Noa Kalokuokamaile
- House: Laʻanui
- Father: Henry Mario Salazar
- Mother: Helena Kalokuokamaile Wilcox
- Occupation: Musician

Owana Kaʻōhelelani Mahealani-Rose Salazar (born October 30, 1953) is an American musician and activist. She is thought to be the only female steel guitar player in Hawaiʻi trained by Jerry Byrd. A descendant of Theresa Laʻanui, Salazar is also a member of the House of Laʻanui, a collateral branch of the House of Kamehameha, and has been involved in Hawaiian sovereignty issues for many years, claiming the right to the defunct Hawaiian throne.

== Birth, family and early life ==
Owana Kaʻohelelani Mahealani-Rose Salazar was born in October 1953. Her parents were Helena Kalokuokamaile Wilcox and Henry Mario Salazar. She is a member of the House of Laʻanui, a collateral branch of the House of Kamehameha.

Salazar was the only girl in a family of five. "Our family discussions were vast... about many of our ancestors, about their roles in Hawaiiʻs history, about the crown lands, about Robert Wilcox, about Princess Theresa going to Washington, about Princess Elizabeth going to Washington to petition Congress to survey the crown lands."

Salazar was raised on the island of Oahu and graduated from Kamehameha Schools, where she sang with the Concert Glee Club, and the University of Hawaii, where she learned Kihoʻalu (slack key guitar). Salazar studied hula with the Kumu Hula, Hoʻakalei Kamauʻu, Hoʻoulu Richards and Winona Beamer. In addition to studying traditional western music theory, studied voice with Elizabeth Cole, and studied piano, string methods, guitar, Javanese dance and gamelan as well as continuing to study hula.

== Music career ==
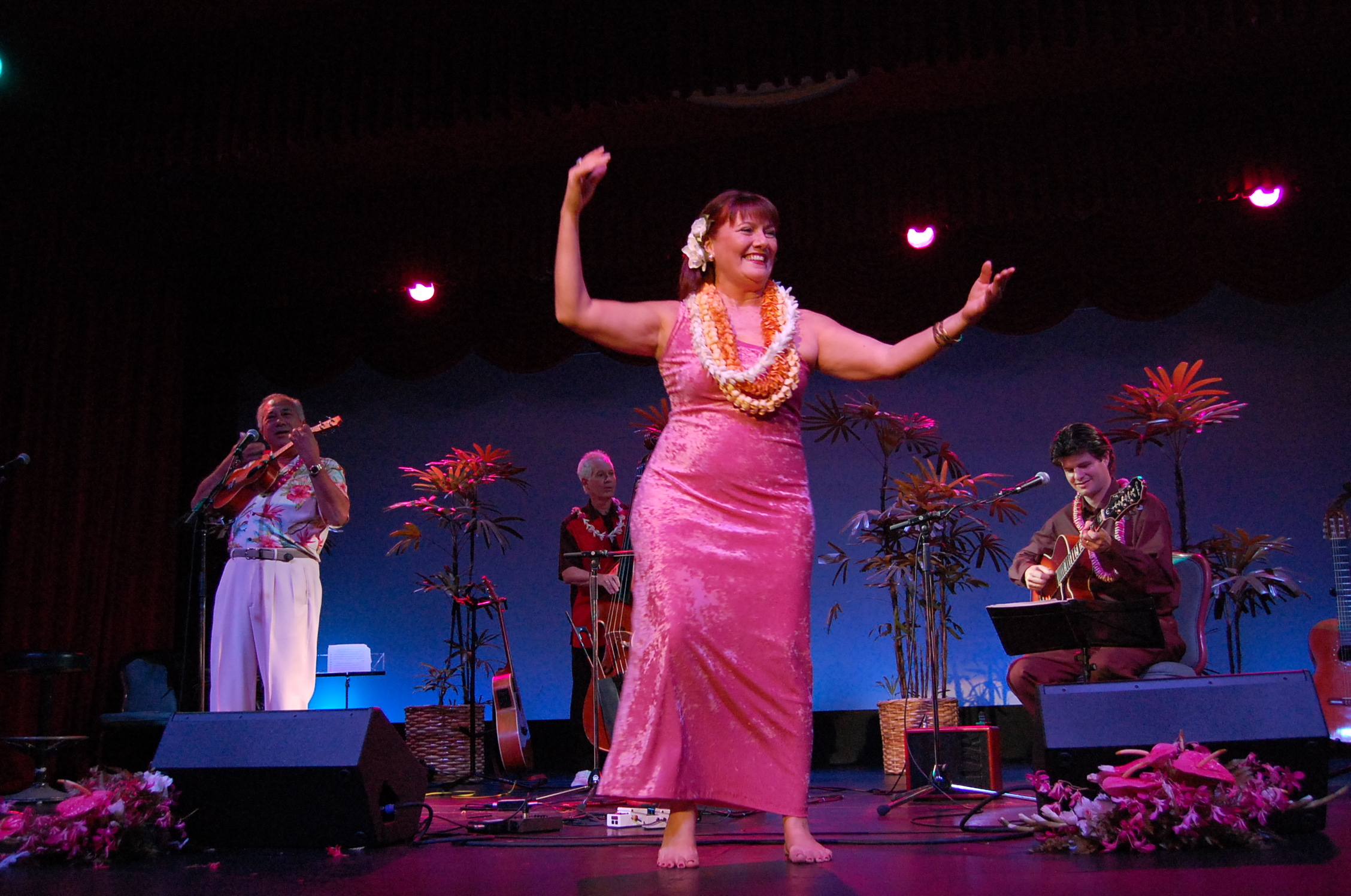
Salazar performing in 2008

At the start of her public career, Salazar performed with Hawaiian headliners such as Don Ho Ohta-San, Ed Kenney and Charles K.L. Davis. She was introduced to the world of Kihoʻalu by friend Nelson Hiu. Combining music theory with her repertoire of Hawaiian songs and slack key, Salazar developed her playing skills with help from her professors and other fellow musicians such as George Kuo, Bla Pahinui, Cyril Pahinui, Dennis Kamakahi, George Kahumoku Jr. and Sonny Chillingworth. Other musical influences include Joni Mitchell, Johnny Mathis, Connie Francis, Stevie Wonder, Genoa Keawe, Gabby Pahinui, Lena Machado, and Marvin Gaye.

Her first recording in 1986, Owana and Kaʻipo, In Kona was nominated in the category of Most Promising Artist in the Na Hoku Hanohano Awards, a Hawaiian music industry salute. The following year, her second recording, Owana, was a final ballot nominee for Contemporary Hawaiian Album of the Year and Female Vocalist of the Year. Pupukea describes the characteristics of the ocean on the North Shore of Oʻahu. Kula Morning takes you upcountry Maui, gazing from mountain to the sea. "Na Wai" is a playful poetic expression of love's experiences, full of Hawaiian kaona (hidden meanings). "Kalamaula" celebrates the early homesteading movement of the Hawaiian people. "Silhouette Hula" is a hapa haole piece, recalling the early jazz years of Hawaiian music.

For most of the 1980s, Salazar sang Hawaiian classics with the Royal Hawaiian Band and performed at venues in Waikiki and Japan. Jerry Byrd accepted Salazar as his student for formal study of Hawaiian steel guitar. Eventually, she received a full scholarship from the Hawaiian Steel Guitar Association. In 1992, she became Byrd's only female graduate and has been called Hawaii's preeminent female steel guitarist. Besides Hawaii, Salazar has also performed in Tahiti, New Zealand, Australia, and the Americas. In January 2000, she became the first woman to tour with the Hawaiian Slack Key Festival along with George Kahumoku Jr., Keoki Kahumoku and Daniel Ho.

=== Discography (partial) ===
- "Owana and Ka'ipo IN KONA" (1986), Nominated: Most Promising Artist of the Year.
- Owana (1987), Nominated: Female Vocalist of the Year; Contemporary Hawaiian Album of the Year.
- Wahine Slack n’ Steel (2003), Winner: Contemporary Hawaiian Album of the Year. Nominated: Female Vocalist of the Year; Album of the Year.
- Hula Jazz (2005), Winner: Jazz Album of the Year; Nominated: Female Vocalist of the Year; Album of the Year; Song of the Year
- Hawaiian Slack Key Masters: Volume III, Winner: Grammy Award for Best Hawaiian Music Album
- Hawaiian Slack Key Masters: Volume IV, Winner: Grammy Award for Best Hawaiian Music Album

== Cultural and sovereignty involvement ==
Salazar was initiated into the Daughters and Sons of Hawaiian Warriors, Mamakakaua, a lineage society of descendants of Hawaii's ruling chiefs. She served as family liaison to the Mayor's Office of Culture and the Arts for two years, with the goal of planning, commissioning and unveiling a life-size bronze statue of her great-grandfather Robert William Wilcox. His statue was installed at Wilcox Park in downtown Honolulu, on the corner of King and Fort Street.

=== Claim to the throne of the Hawaiian Kingdom ===
Salazar rejects the legality of the 1898 annexation of Hawaii by the United States, and as such believes the Hawaiian Kingdom still legally exists. Dismissing the succession right of Abigail Kinoiki Kekaulike Kawānanakoa, Salazar maintains that her own immediate family (as members of the House of Laʻanui, a collateral branch of the House of Kamehameha) are rightful rulers of the kingdom, as well as being the legal holders of the former Hawaiian crown lands. This claim is based on descent from King Keōua (d.ca. 1750s/60s) via a niece of Elizabeth Kekaʻaniau (d. 1928), one of 15 children of high aliʻi status attending the Chief's Children's School in 1844 who appear on a list, endorsed by Kamehameha III. However, genealogist Edith McKenzie stated that of those eligible to be rulers, "everyone on the Chiefs Children's School list was eligible to rule, but it was required that those who did had to be considered and approved by the House of Nobles. Only Kamehameha IV and Emma Rooke ever were."

== Personal life ==
Salazar has been married at least twice and has two children. She is Catholic and a member of the Order of Saint Michael of the Wing.

== Honours ==
=== Dynastic Orders ===
==== Foreign Royal Houses ====
- Dame Grand Cordon of the Royal and Hashemite Order of the Pearl

== Family tree ==
Laʻanui, Wilcox, Salazar family tree

**Key: Subjects with bold titles and blue bold box = Aliʻi line. Bold title and grey bolded box = Lower ranking Aliʻi line. Bold title and un-bolded box = European nobility. Regular name and box = makaʻāinana or untitled foreign subject**.

**Keōua** (Note: Hawaiian Native Claims Settlement Study Commission, Exhibit B, Genealogy Descent from the Kamehameha Royal Family .)	Kahikikalaokalani	**Kekuʻiapoiwa II**
**Kalokuokamaile**	Kaloiokalani	**Kaʻahumanu**	**Kamehameha I**	**Kalākua Kaheiheimālie**
**Kaohele**	Nuhi	Jean Baptiste Rives	**Holau II**
**Makole (k)**	**Haupa (w)**	**Namahana Piia (w)**	**Gideon Peleioholani Laanui**; 1797–1849 **né Laʻanui**	**Theresa Owana Kaheiheimalie Reeves**
Captain William Slocum Wilcox; 1814–1910	**Kalua**; 1836–1865	**Gideon Kailipalaki Laanui**; 1840–1871	Elizabeth Kamaikaopa	**Elizabeth Kekaʻaniau Laʻanui Pratt**; 1834–1928 **née Elizabeth Kekaʻaniau**
**Gina Sobrero-Wilcox**; 1863-1912 (**née Baroness Gina Sobrero**)	**Robert William Kalanihiapo Wilcox** (February 15, 1855 - October 23, 1903) (Note: Historical Dictionary of the Gilded Age lists Wilcox's full birth and death dating.)	**Theresa Owana Kaʻohelelani Laʻanui**	Alexander Joy Cartwright III	Elmer Miller (Note: Marriage license of Jno K. Kilioe Miller to Virginia K. Wilcox list E.O Miller as father and Makalike as mother of Jno. (Note: "E.O.Miller". Family Search. Territory of Hawaii. Marriage license of Jno Miller to Virginia K. Wilcox - E. O. Miller in entry for Jno. K. Miller and Virginia K. Wilcox, 11 Jun 1916; citing Honolulu, Honolulu, Hawaii, reference 12495B; FHL microfilm 1,711,737))	Makalike
**Robert Kalanikupuapaikalaninui Keōua Wilcox**	Helen Kaleipuanani Simerson Wilburton	John Kilioe Miller; May 26, 1896 - April 20, 1969 (Note: United States World War I Draft Registration Cards, 1917-1918. (Note: "John K. Miller". Family Search. Territory of Hawaii.Draft card - John K Miller, 1917-1918; citing Honolulu City no 1, Hawaii, United States, NARA microfilm publication M1509 (Washington D.C.: National Archives and Records Administration, n.d.); FHL microfilm 1,452,096))	**Virginia Kahoa Kaʻahumanu Kaihikapumahana Wilcox** (Note: Hawaii Marriages, 1826-1922.)	**Elizabeth Kaʻakaualaninui Wilcox**	Daisy Emmalani Napulahaokalani Cartwright	Eva Kuwailanimamao Cartwright
Henry Mario Salazar	**Helena Kalokuokamaile Wilcox Salazar-Machado**; April 13, 1917 – September 17, 1988 (née Wilcox)	Henry Machado, Sr.
**Henry C. Keaweikekahialiiokamoku Salazar**	**Paul C. Kalokuokamaile Salazar**	**Michael Carl Kauhiokalani Salazar**	**Stephen Craig Laanui Salazar**	**Owana Kaohelelani Mahealani-Rose Salazar**
