= House of Keoua =

Extended royal family of Ancient Hawaii

The House of Keōua Nui (Hale O Keōua Nui), or simply House of Keōua, is the extended royal family of Ancient Hawaii from which the reigning family of Kamehameha I and Lunalilo were descended.

== Origins ==
A younger branch of the reigning family of Keaweʻīkekahialiʻiokamoku (from the Big Island of Hawaiʻi), the dynastic line was established by Keōua Kalanikupuapaʻikalaninui Ahilapalapa, who was the father of Kamehameha I. He was the only son of Keʻeaumoku the Great and High Chiefess Kamakaʻīmoku.

Keōua's paternal lineage derives from a branch of the royal family of Hawaiʻi Island. His father, High Chief Keʻeaumoku-nui of Kohala and Kona, was the second son of Keaweʻīkekahialiʻiokamoku, King of Hawaiʻi Island and his half-sister bride, Kalanikauleleiaiwi. He was known as a pio chief of the highest rank since both his mother and father were pure royal blood. He even outranked his elder brother Kalaninuiamamao, from whom descends the House of Kalākaua and House of Kawānanakoa. It was because of these two brothers, who contested for the succession to the kingship of the island of Hawaiʻi after Keaweʻīkekahialiʻiokamoku's death, that the island was dissolved into a handful independent warring factions.

The ancestry of Keōua's mother, High Chiefess Kamakaʻīmoku, daughter of Kuʻa Nuʻuanu, Oʻahu district chief descended from the nobility of Hilo who were descendants of King ʻUmi-a-Līloa's youngest son Kumalae, ruler of Hilo. His mother was also mother of Kalaniʻōpuʻu, by Kalaninuiamamao, making him half-brother of Kalaniʻōpuʻu and uncle of Kīwalaʻō. Kamakaʻimoku was also the half-sister of Heulu (through their mother Umiula-a-kaʻahumanu), the father of Keawe-a-Heulu, another ancestor of the House of Kalākaua.

Kamehameha I of the House of Keōua Nui conquered the separate islands in 1795, uniting them under a single Kingdom of Hawaii. His direct descendants are called the House of Kamehameha. His siblings' houses were then also considered a part of the royal family.

== Branches of the House of Keōua Nui ==
=== Male line ===
- House of Laʻanui-Kalokuokamaile
  - Through Prince Kalokuokamaile, eldest son by Kahikikala
    - Survives today
- House of Kamehameha (reigned 1795–1872)
  - Through Kamehameha I, second son and first son by Kekūʻiapoiwa II
    - Descendants were Ruth Keʻelikōlani, Bernice Pauahi, and Albert Kunuiakea (illegitimate)
- House of Kealiʻimaikaʻi
  - Through Kealiʻimaikaʻi, his third son, second son by Kekūʻiapoiwa II
    - Descendants were Peter Young Kaeo, Emma Kaleleonalani, wife of Kamehameha IV; and Albert Kunuiakea, also of the House of Kamehameha.
- House of Kalaimamahu (reigned 1873–1874)
  - Through Prince Kalaimamahu, his fourth son, by Kamakaeheikuli
    - Descendants were King William Charles Lunalilo and Kuhina Nui Miriam Auhea Kekāuluohi
    - Survives through line of Miriam Auhea Kekāuluohi Crowningburg

=== Female line ===
- Kekuiapoiwa Liliha, daughter by Kalola,
  - Descendant, Keōpūolani, married Kamehameha I and mother of Kamehameha II and Kamehameha III
- Kiʻilaweau, daughter by Manona
  - Descendant, Kekuaokalani, also of the House of Kealiimaikai

== Website ==
- Official Website of the Royal Houses of Keōua Nui
