= Kalokuokamaile =

- High Chief
- Born: Maui
- Spouse: Kaloiokalani
- Issue: Kaohelelani
- House: House of Kalokuokamaile
- Father: Keōua
- Mother: Kahikikalaokalani

Kalokuokamaile (meaning "downpour/blowing of the maile" in Hawaiian), was a Hawaiian chief and first-born son of Keoua Kalanikupuapaikalaninui and half-brother of Kamehameha the Great who unified the Hawaiian Islands in 1810. He was the primogenitor of the Royal House of Keoua nui.

== Biography ==
He was born on the island of Maui. His mother was the High Chiefess Kahikikalaokalani ruler of Hana, Kipahulu and Kaupo and possessed the far famed tabu "Ka Poʻo Hoʻolewa i ka La". The tabu signified the laying of the head towards the sun's position in the heavens from its rising unto its setting. Days of observance of this tabu were strictly kept, the only time for recreation during the tabu must be taken from between the setting of the luminary and the dawn of a new day. Kalokuokmaile was Keoua's first-born son and was deemed "Ka Keiki o Kona wa Heuole," which means the offspring of his beardless youth. At age three his father return to his ancestral home on the Big Island of Hawaii and left Kalokuokamaile to be raised by his mother.

Years passed and he grew up to be athletic, of good and mild nature, with no selfish or ambitious motives and to take care of his people as the ruler when his mother died.

He had taken a wife from the neighboring district of Kahikinui and Honuaula, ruled over by a chiefly family of which Kaloiokalani was the only daughter. Tiding of her fine qualities had reached Hana. He set out to visit that court and by tradition he paid his visits by night. He was happily received by the parents and soon arrangements for the royal nuptials were completed. When the wedding had taken place and feasting and dancing ended, Kalokuokamaile made preparations to return to Hana. As Kaloiokalani was a great favorite with her people, the people volunteered to get up a great cavalcade to escort the couple as far as Kipahulu District. Oral history says the procession so large it was mistaken for an invasion. However Kalokuokamaile was at last settled at the old family homestead and affairs ran smoothly.

They had one child, a daughter named Kaohelelani. She was verging into maidenhood when he died. His people showed their affection by making his grave on the highest peak, Kauwiki. When news of his death reaching his half-brother Kamehameha I, he decided to take his fatherless niece into his court and for their brother Kealiimaikai to hold Kaohelelani's land inheritances until she reached majority. However, when Kamehameha conquered Kalanikupule, King of Maui, he partitioned the land out to the chiefs who had aided him.

== Family tree ==
Laʻanui, Wilcox, Salazar family tree

**Key: Subjects with bold titles and blue bold box = Aliʻi line. Bold title and grey bolded box = Lower ranking Aliʻi line. Bold title and un-bolded box = European nobility. Regular name and box = makaʻāinana or untitled foreign subject**.

**Keōua** (Note: Hawaiian Native Claims Settlement Study Commission, Exhibit B, Genealogy Descent from the Kamehameha Royal Family .)	Kahikikalaokalani	**Kekuʻiapoiwa II**
**Kalokuokamaile**	Kaloiokalani	**Kaʻahumanu**	**Kamehameha I**	**Kalākua Kaheiheimālie**
**Kaohele**	Nuhi	Jean Baptiste Rives	**Holau II**
**Makole (k)**	**Haupa (w)**	**Namahana Piia (w)**	**Gideon Peleioholani Laanui**; 1797–1849 **né Laʻanui**	**Theresa Owana Kaheiheimalie Reeves**
Captain William Slocum Wilcox; 1814–1910	**Kalua**; 1836–1865	**Gideon Kailipalaki Laanui**; 1840–1871	Elizabeth Kamaikaopa	**Elizabeth Kekaʻaniau Laʻanui Pratt**; 1834–1928 **née Elizabeth Kekaʻaniau**
**Gina Sobrero-Wilcox**; 1863-1912 (**née Baroness Gina Sobrero**)	**Robert William Kalanihiapo Wilcox** (February 15, 1855 - October 23, 1903) (Note: Historical Dictionary of the Gilded Age lists Wilcox's full birth and death dating.)	**Theresa Owana Kaʻohelelani Laʻanui**	Alexander Joy Cartwright III	Elmer Miller (Note: Marriage license of Jno K. Kilioe Miller to Virginia K. Wilcox list E.O Miller as father and Makalike as mother of Jno. (Note: "E.O.Miller". Family Search. Territory of Hawaii. Marriage license of Jno Miller to Virginia K. Wilcox - E. O. Miller in entry for Jno. K. Miller and Virginia K. Wilcox, 11 Jun 1916; citing Honolulu, Honolulu, Hawaii, reference 12495B; FHL microfilm 1,711,737))	Makalike
**Robert Kalanikupuapaikalaninui Keōua Wilcox**	Helen Kaleipuanani Simerson Wilburton	John Kilioe Miller; May 26, 1896 - April 20, 1969 (Note: United States World War I Draft Registration Cards, 1917-1918. (Note: "John K. Miller". Family Search. Territory of Hawaii.Draft card - John K Miller, 1917-1918; citing Honolulu City no 1, Hawaii, United States, NARA microfilm publication M1509 (Washington D.C.: National Archives and Records Administration, n.d.); FHL microfilm 1,452,096))	**Virginia Kahoa Kaʻahumanu Kaihikapumahana Wilcox** (Note: Hawaii Marriages, 1826-1922.)	**Elizabeth Kaʻakaualaninui Wilcox**	Daisy Emmalani Napulahaokalani Cartwright	Eva Kuwailanimamao Cartwright
Henry Mario Salazar	**Helena Kalokuokamaile Wilcox Salazar-Machado**; April 13, 1917 – September 17, 1988 (née Wilcox)	Henry Machado, Sr.
**Henry C. Keaweikekahialiiokamoku Salazar**	**Paul C. Kalokuokamaile Salazar**	**Michael Carl Kauhiokalani Salazar**	**Stephen Craig Laanui Salazar**	**Owana Kaohelelani Mahealani-Rose Salazar**
