= Royal School (Hawaii) =

Historic school in Hawaii, United States

Location
- 1519 Queen Emma Street; Honolulu, Hawai'i; United States

Information
- Other name: Royal Elementary School
- Former name: Chiefs' Children's School (1839-1846)
- Established: 1839; 187 years ago
- Grades: K-5

The Royal School is a historic school founded in 1839 in Honolulu, Hawaiʻi, as the Chiefs' Children's School. The school was renamed as the Royal School in 1846. After the boarding closed in 1850, it became a day school for children. It later became a public elementary school, and moved to its present campus in 1967.

The present Royal Elementary School is a public elementary school under the Hawaii State Department of Education, that continues to eductate children from kindergarten to Grade 5. It has been named a Blue Ribbon School several times.

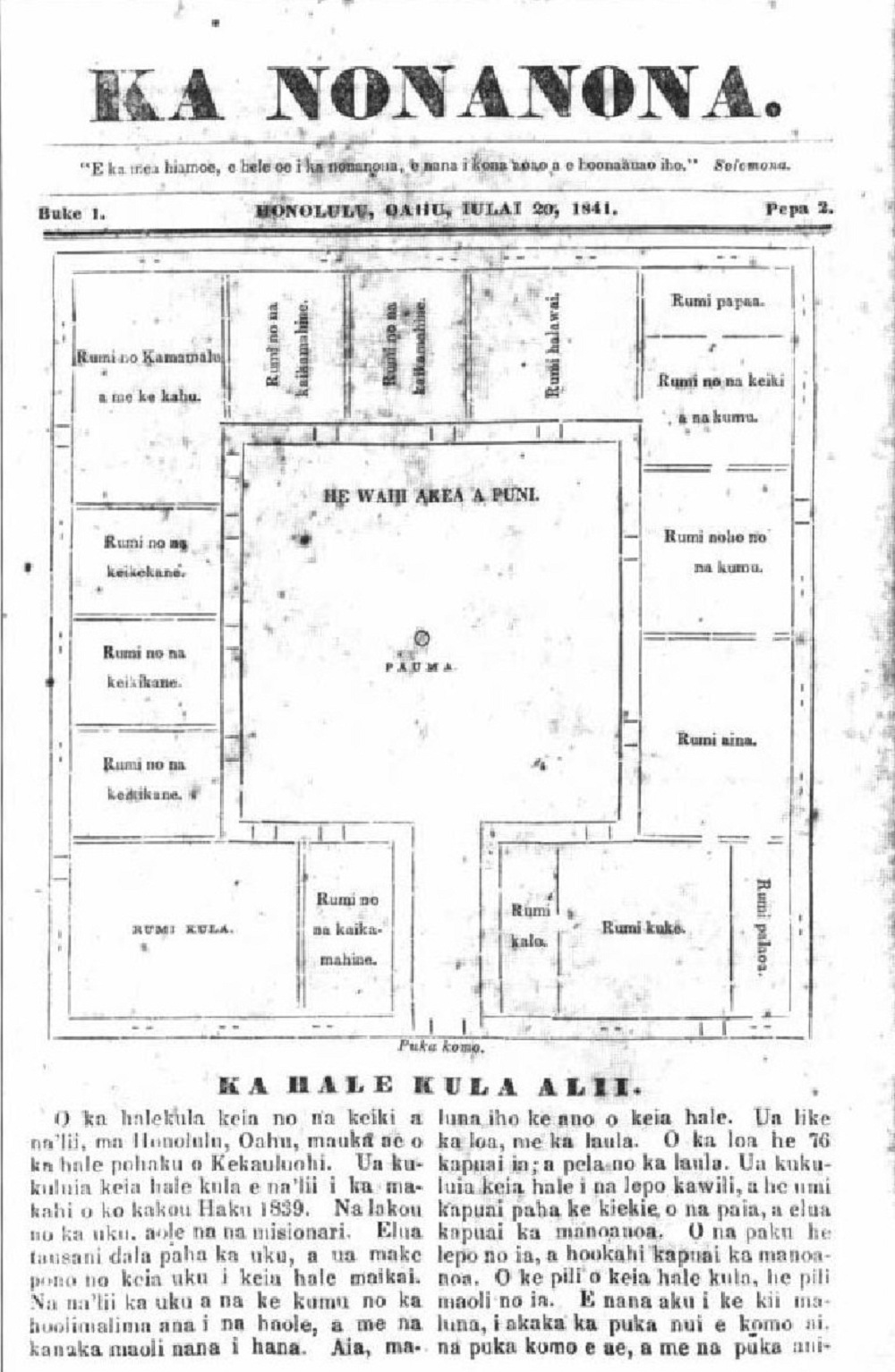
The diagram of the Chiefs' Children's School which appeared on the front page of the Hawaiian newspaper Ka Nonanona on July 20, 1841

== History ==
The Chiefs' Children's School was founded by King Kamehameha III of the Kingdom of Hawaii as a boarding school to educate the children of the Hawaiian royalty (aliʻi). The school was first located where the ʻIolani Barracks stand now. The need for the school was agreed upon during the general meeting of the mission in June 1839. The buildings were ready by 1840, and two more students were added in 1842.

An 1844 article in the Polynesian listed all children with the exception of John William Pitt Kīnaʻu, who had just enrolled, as "princes and chiefs eligible to rulers."

The main goal of this school was to educate the next generation of Hawaiian royalty to govern. Seven families that were eligible under succession laws stated in the 1840 Constitution of the Kingdom of Hawaii and that had converted to Christianity, who were Kamehameha's closest relatives, made up the majority of the school. They were:

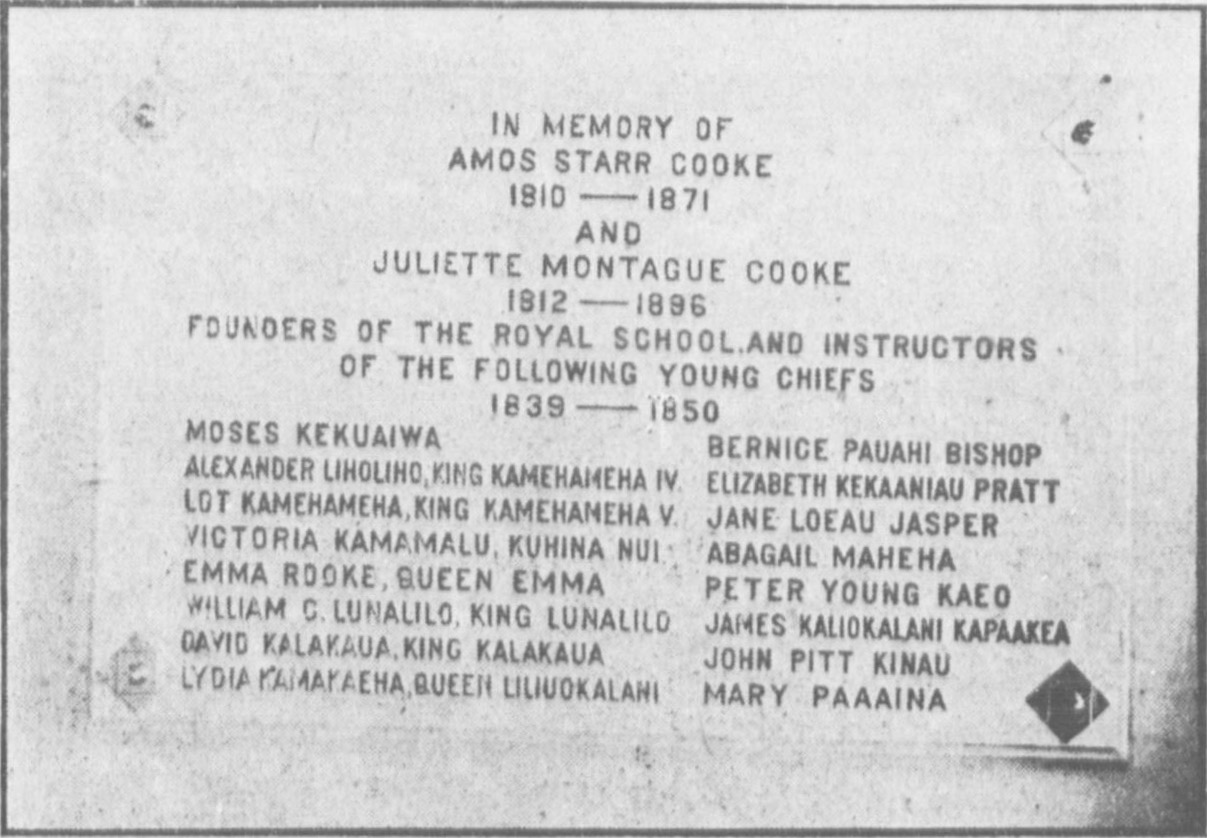
The Cooke Memorial Tablet at Kawaiahaʻo Church commemorating the sixteen royal children and their teachers

- From the sister of Kamehameha III: Kīnaʻu's children, Lot, Victoria Kamāmalu, Moses Kekuaiwa and Alexander Liholiho;
- From his half-brother Pauli Kaʻōleiokū's great-granddaughter and great-great-grandson: Bernice Pauahi and John William Pitt Kīnaʻu;
- From his father's younger brother, Keliʻimaikaʻi: his great-great-granddaughter, Emma Naʻea and great-great-grandson, Peter Young Kaʻeo;
- From the younger brother of his father, Kalaimamahu: his great-grandson, William Charles Lunalilo;
- From his father's eldest brother, Kalokuokamaile: his great-granddaughter, Elizabeth Kekaʻaniau Laʻanui;
- From his grandfather's cousin, a direct line from one of the royal twins, Kameʻeiamoku's great-great-grandchildren: David Kalākaua, Lydia Kamakaeha and James Kaliokalani;
- Also from his grandfather's cousin, Kahekili, daughters of Liliha with Kalaniulumoku: Jane Loeau; and with Namaile: Abigail Maheha.

It was run by Amos Starr Cooke and Juliette Montague Cooke from the American Board of Commissioners for Foreign Missions. It was a long, two-story frame building with a large dining room and separate sleeping quarters for the children and for the Cooke family. There was also the New England parlor, furnished with handmade and treasured furniture sent from home, and with much brought from China. It resembled nothing Hawaiian in its appearance nor its atmosphere. The royal children were taught how to speak and act like Americans. The Hawaiian kahu (traditional caretaker of children) John Papa ʻĪʻī was selected as assistant teacher.

In 1846, legislation organizing the executive departments of the Hawaiian Kingdom placed the school under the government-funded Department of Public Instruction, headed by Richard Armstrong, and formally renamed it the "Royal School". Section V provided:

The select school at Honolulu, on the island of Oahu, in which are now assembled the children of the chiefs, shall be continued, and shall be denominated the royal school. The minister of public instruction shall have power to receive into said school, for the general purposes of education and moral training, any other children being descendants of the royal line or heirs of chiefs of rank.

By 1848 the school declined as the children graduated or married. For example, Moses left school in 1847 to live with his father and died in the 1848 measles epidemic. Jane married Mr. Jasper. Missionary children were also allowed to attend in 1849. It was moved to its present location in 1850 and became a day school instead of a boarding school for the general public. The next principal was Edward Griffin Beckwith (1826–1909) until he became president of Oahu College in 1854. In 1853 it had 121 students, of whom 8 were pure Hawaiian and 18, part Hawaiian.

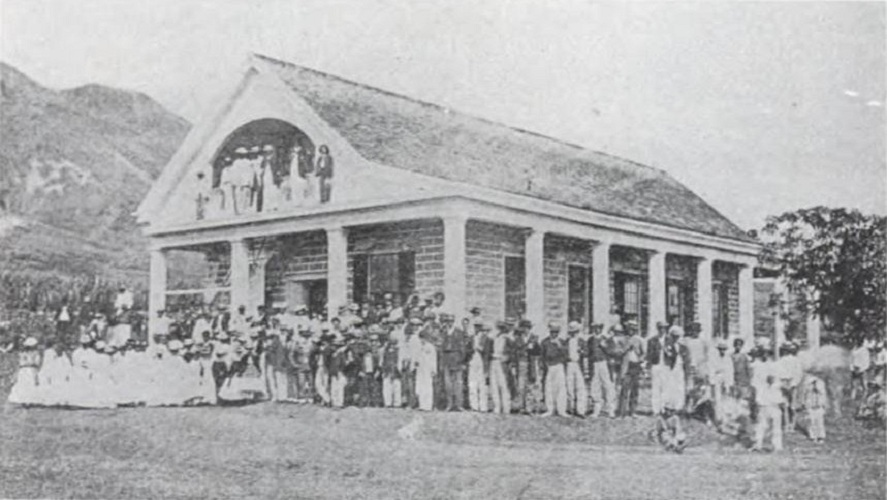
The second school for the public in 1857.

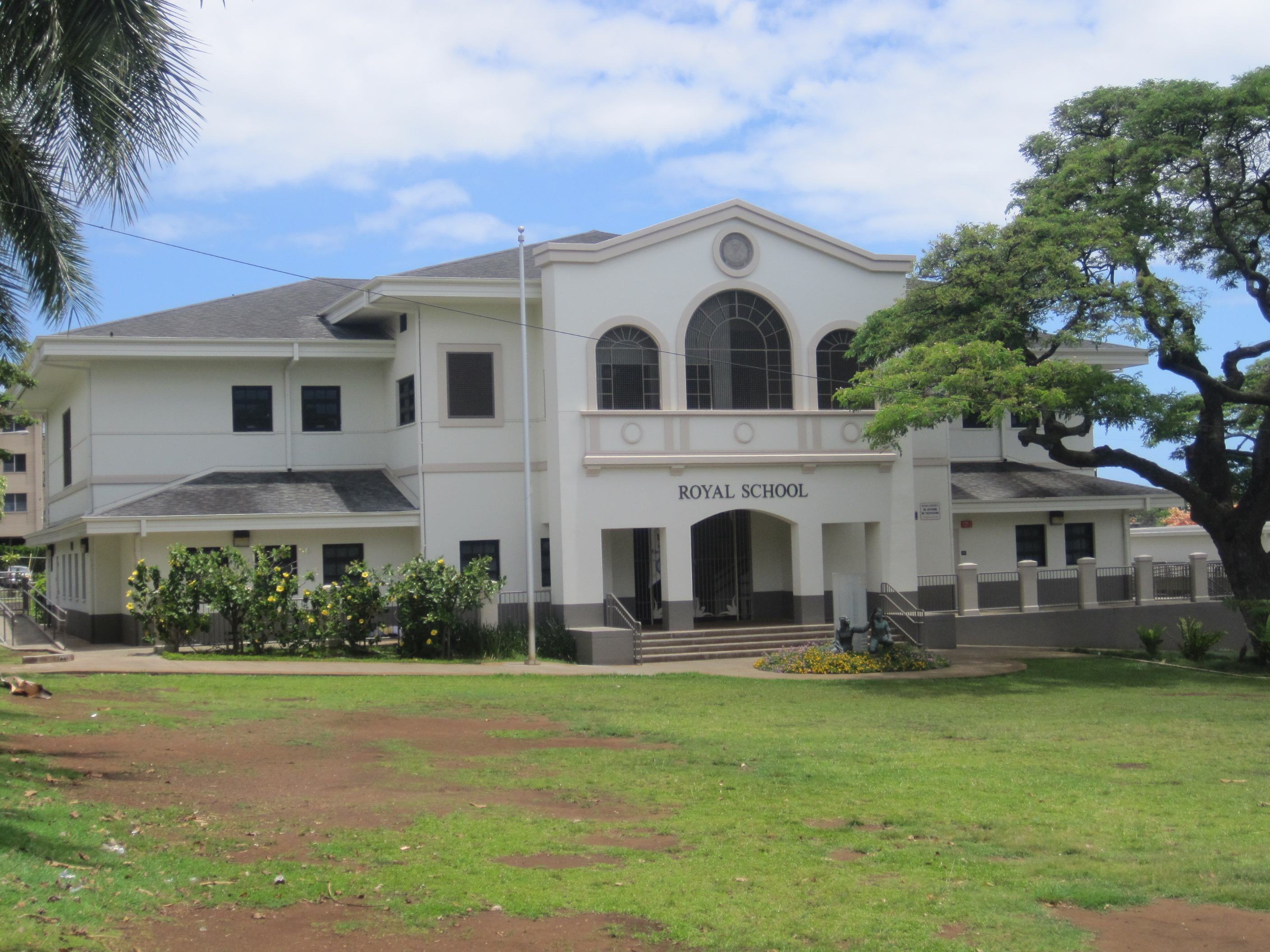
Current administration/library building erected in 2000, designed to resemble earlier building demolished to accommodate new highway

== Current day ==
It is now a public elementary school, Royal Elementary School, the oldest school on the island of Oʻahu. It is run under the Hawaii State Department of Education and serves grades K-5. It is located at 1519 Queen Emma Street, coordinates 21°18′42″N 157°51′13″W. A sculpture by Kim Duffett "Mai ka Hina Kua a ka Hina Alo" was added in 2005, which was partially funded by a foundation named for the Cooke Family.

== Alumni ==
=== Ruling alumni ===
- Queen Liliuokalani
- Queen Emma, wife of Kamehameha IV
- King David Kalākaua
- King Kamehameha IV
- King Kamehameha V
- Princess Victoria Kamāmalu, Kuhina Nui
- King William Charles Lunalilo

=== Aliʻi alumni ===
- Aliʻi Bernice Pauahi Bishop
- Aliʻi Jane Loeau
- Aliʻi Abigail Maheha
- Aliʻi Mary Polly Paʻaʻāina
- Aliʻi Peter Young Kaʻeo
- Aliʻi Elizabeth Kekaʻaniau Pratt
- Prince Moses Kekūāiwa
- Prince John William Pitt Kīnaʻu
- Ali'i James Kaliokalani

=== Aliʻi alumni as day school ===
- Gideon Kailipalaki Laanui
- Nancy Sumner
- Jane Swinton
- Martha Swinton
- Julia Moemalie
- Mary Ann Kiliwehi
- John Mahiʻai Kāneakua
