= Keōua =

Father of Kamehameha I of Hawaiʻi (died c. 1750s–1760s)

Keōua Nui
- Died: c. 1750s–1760s Piopio, Hilo
- Spouses: Kahikikala; Kalanilehua; Kekuʻiapoiwa II; Kamakaeheikuli; Kalola; Manono I Akahi-a-Kawalu; Kamakaʻehekulinui
- Issue: Kalokuokamaile; Kamehameha I Keliʻimaikaʻi; Kalaʻimamahu; Kaweloʻokalani; Kekuiapoiwa Liliha; Kiʻilaweau; Kaleiwohi
Names
- Keōua Kalanikupuapaʻīkalaninui Ahilapalapa
- House: House of Keōua Nui
- Father: Kalanikeʻeaumoku
- Mother: Kamakaimoku

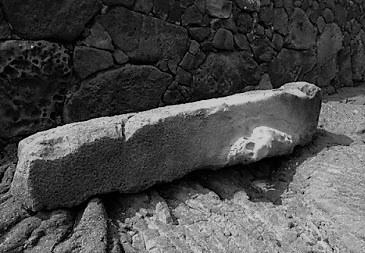
The resting spot for the High Chief Keoua Nui

Keōua Kalanikupuapaʻīkalaninui Ahilapalapa, sometimes called Keōua Nui ("Keōua the Great") (died c. 1750s–1760s) was an Ancient Hawaiian noble and the father of Kamehameha I, the first King of united Hawaiʻi. He was progenitor of the House of Keōua Nui. His first name Keoua, or Ke-ao-ua means "the rain cloud" and was given to him by his subjects because of his generosity and his sacred kapu of the heavenly rains.

== Life ==
Keōua Nui's father was the High Chief Keeaumoku Nui, the second son of Keaweʻīkekahialiʻiokamoku, Aliʻi ʻAimoku of Hawaiʻi island, and his second wife, Queen Kalanikauleleiaiwi. His mother, High Chiefess Kamakaʻimoku, was from the noble family of ʻĪ of Hilo. Keōua was a half-brother of King Kalaniʻōpuʻu of the island of Hawaiʻi through his mother who also married Kalaninuiamamao, Kalaniʻōpuʻu's father.

His name Keoua, or Ke-ao-ua means "the rain cloud" and was given to him by his subjects because of his generosity and because of the formation of the rain clouds which was his sacred kapu that alerted him and his people of danger as well as the dissipation of clouds which was a sign of safety . The different rains also guided him and his people, such as a downpour of rain, this was the highest blessing for which his firstborn Kalokuokamaile was named after. Keoua’s birth name was Kalanikupuapa`ikalaninui Ahilapalapa and describes his chiefly kapu, the sacred ali`i that extends above and touches the great heavens born of the divine flame of eternity. His grandson, King Kamehameha III was given the name Kauikeaouli that also puts this sacred kapu upon him as the importance of the name Keaouli of Keoua, which has the meaning of the dark, black, thick, esteemed cloud (a rain cloud). According to the prophet, Kapihe, upon the birth of Kamehameha III, he saw a bank of dark clouds high in the heavens, alerting him of trouble for the newborn. Upon arrival at Keopuolani’s birth of the young prince where he was placed lifeless and not breathing, the prophet and kahuna offered a prayer, bringing life back into the body of Kamehameha III. The great-grandson of Keoua was King Kamehameha V, he was also named after this sacred kapu which was placed upon him by carrying the name of Kalanikupuapa`ikalaninui.

Keōua Nui was raised as royalty due to his royal birth. His father was a Piʻo chief which was considered among the highest rank in Hawaiʻian society. Through his mother and father he was descended from Kings ʻUmi-a-Liloa and Liloa and related to chiefs of Maui, Oahu, and Kauai. He was chief of the Kohala district and Kona district of the island. Although he was a non-ruling chief; the ruling chief of Kona and Kohala was his brother Kalaniʻōpuʻu. However, the ruler Kalaniopu'u gave his war god Kuka'ilimoku to Keoua Nui's son Kamehameha and he became King of all Hawai'i.

During his youth he spent his time at the royal court on Maui where he sought his first wife the High Chiefess Kahikikala-o-kalani, daughter of High Chief Kalahumoku, the Alii of Hana, Kaupo and Kipahulu. They had his eldest son Kalokuokamaile who was deemed Ka Keiki o Kona wa Heuole, which means the offspring of his beardless youth. This first child was coveted with the tabu of “Ka po’o ho’olewa I ka la” which signified the laying of the head towards the sun’s position in the heavens from its rising unto its setting. Days of observance of this tabu was strictly kept and the only time for recreation was between the setting of the luminary and the dawn of a new day so that no shadow could fall upon them.

Keōua later returned home to the island of Hawai`i by the request of his father, Kalani ke’eaumoku nui to espouse his cousin the High Chiefess Kekuiapoiwa II as they were betrothed since infancy and born to them was Kamehameha I, who became king of all the islands by conquest, uniting all the islands under his undivided rule, founder of the Hawaiian kingdom.

His wives were:

- Kahikikala – mother of Kalokuokamaile
- Kalanilehua
- Kekuiapoiwa II – mother of Kamehameha I and Keliʻimaikaʻi
- Kamakaeheikuli – mother of Kalaʻimamahu and Kaweloʻokalani
- Manono I – mother of Kiʻilaweau
- Kalola – mother of Kekuiapoiwa Liliha
- Akahiakapuakuleana – mother of Kaleiwohi

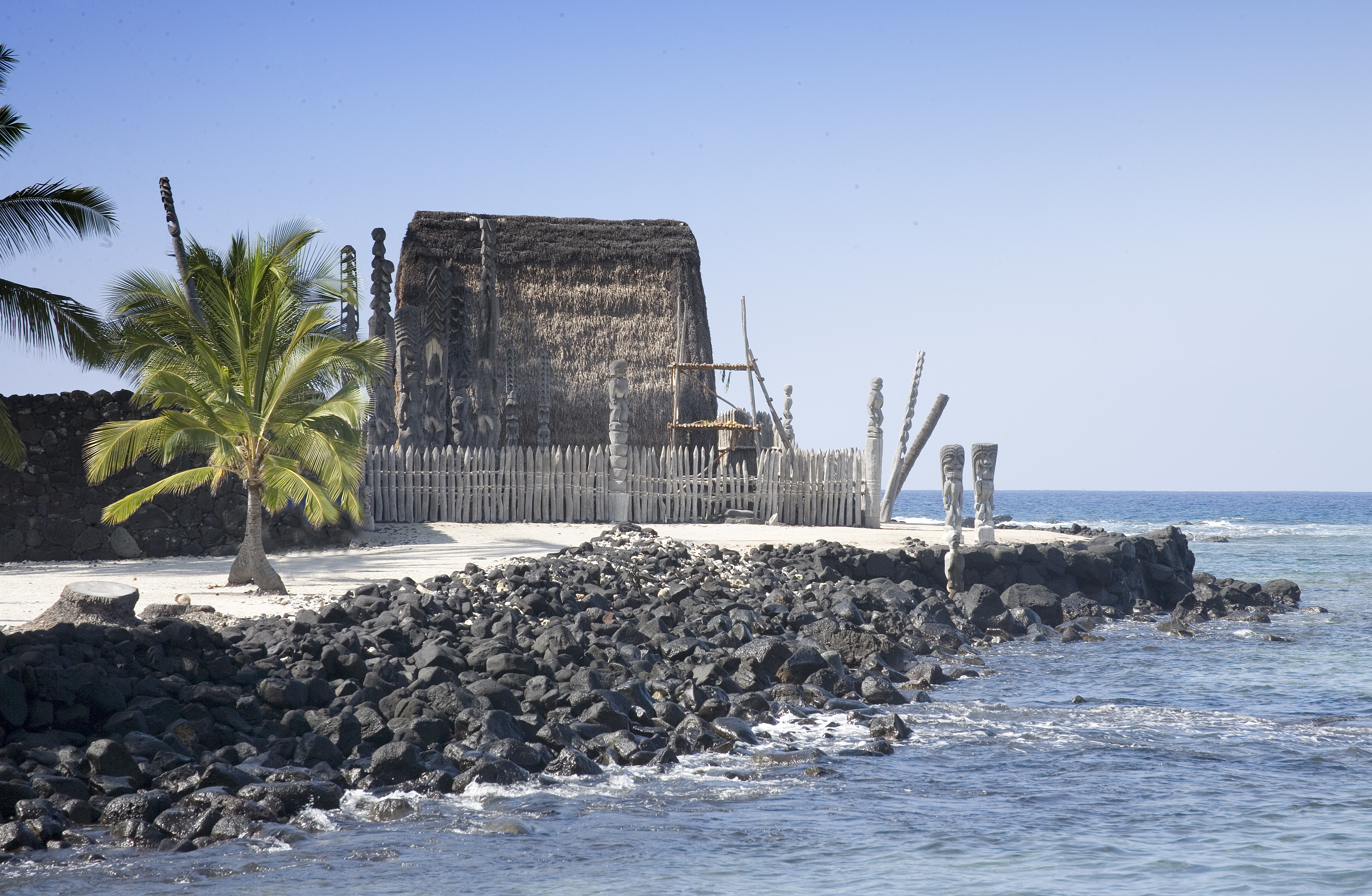
Puʻuhonua o Hōnaunau

At Pu'uhonua o Honaunau, there are two large stones, one serving as a hiding place for Queen Ka'ahumanu during a quarrel with her husband King Kamehameha and the other stone was used by High Chief Keoua Nui as a resting spot. The Keoua stone is on the north side of the 'Ale'ale'a Heiau, it is 12-1/2 feet long and 2-1/2 feet wide and was the spot where Keoua Nui slept while his men were out fishing. The concavity at one end is said to be where his head rested, while his feet almost reached the other end, making him almost equal to the stone length.

His bones were deposited in the cliffs above Kealakekua Bay, which to this day are still called pali kapu o Keōua, "the forbidden cliffs of Keōua". His remaining descendants are generally considered those of his eldest son Kalokuokamaile, and are considered by some the legitimate heirs of the Kamehameha dynasty.

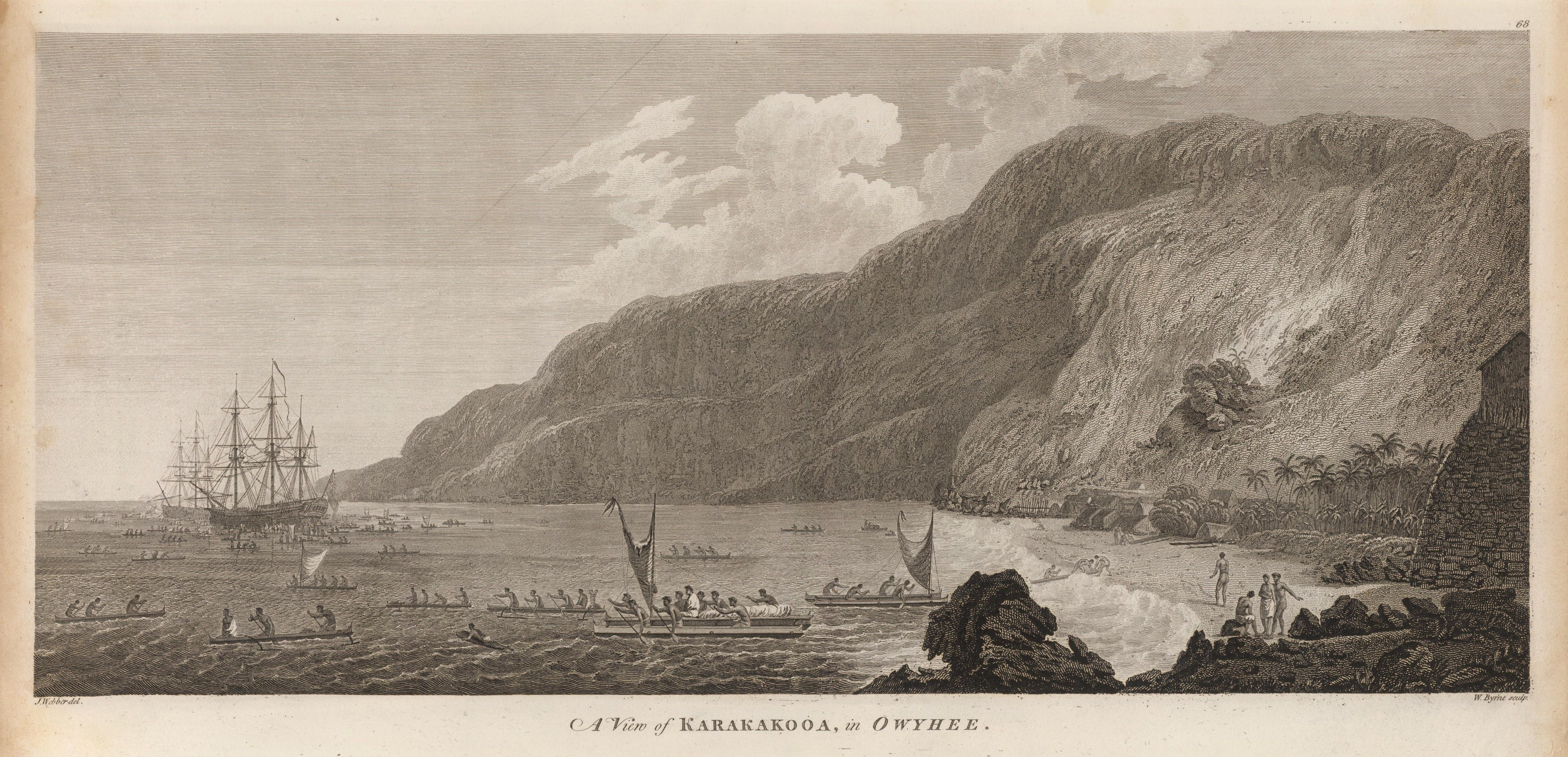
A view of Karakokooa, in Owyhee by John Webber

In 1920, High Chiefess Elizabeth Kekaʻaniau Laʻanui Pratt wrote a book, Keoua Nui: Father of Kings, as a tribute to her great-great grandfather. It was republished in 1999 by his descendant, David Castro. The first use of the name "House of Keōua Nui" dates to a press release by descendant Owana Salazar.

== Ancestry ==
Ancestors of Keōua

16. High Chief Iwikauikaua =#18, 20, 22
8. High Chief Kanaloaikaiwilena Kapulehu
17. Queen Keakamahana of Hawaii =#19, 23
4. Keaweʻīkekahialiʻiokamoku of Hawaii
18. High Chief Iwikauikaua =#16, 20, 22
9. Queen Keakealani of Hawaii
19. Queen Keakamahana of Hawaii =#17, 23
2. Keʻeaumoku, High Chief of Kona and Kohala
20. High Chief Iwikauikaua =#16, 18, 22
10. High Chief Kaneikaiwilani
21. Kauakahikuaanaauakane of Ewa
5. Princess Kalanikauleleaiwi of Hawaii
22. High Chief Iwikauikaua =#16, 18, 20
11. Queen Keakealani of Hawaii =#9
23. Queen Keakamahana of Hawaii =#17, 19
1. Keōua Kalanikupuapaikalaninui Ahilapalapa
24. ʻI, High Chief of Hilo =#30
12. High Chief Nu'uanu
25. High Chiefess Akahikameenoa =#31
6. High Chief Ku-a-Nuʻuanau
13. High Chiefess Kealomako
3. High Chiefess Kamakaʻimoku
28. Kanaluauo, High Chief of Kohala
14. Mahiolole, High Chief of Kohala
29. High Chiefess Hoolaikaiwi
7. High Chiefess Umiula-a-Kaahumanu
30. ʻI, High Chief of Hilo =#24
15. High Chiefess Kanekukaailani
31. High Chiefess Akahikameenoa =#25

== Bibliography ==
- Houston, Victor S. K. (1931). "Kamehameha the Great". In Ford, Alexander Hume (ed.). The Mid-Pacific Magazine, Volume 42. T.H., A.H. Ford; Pan-Pacific Union, Pan-Pacific Research Institution. pp. 129–132.
