= Nāmāhāna Piʻia =

Hawaiian royal consort (d. 1829)

Lydia Nāmāhāna Piʻia
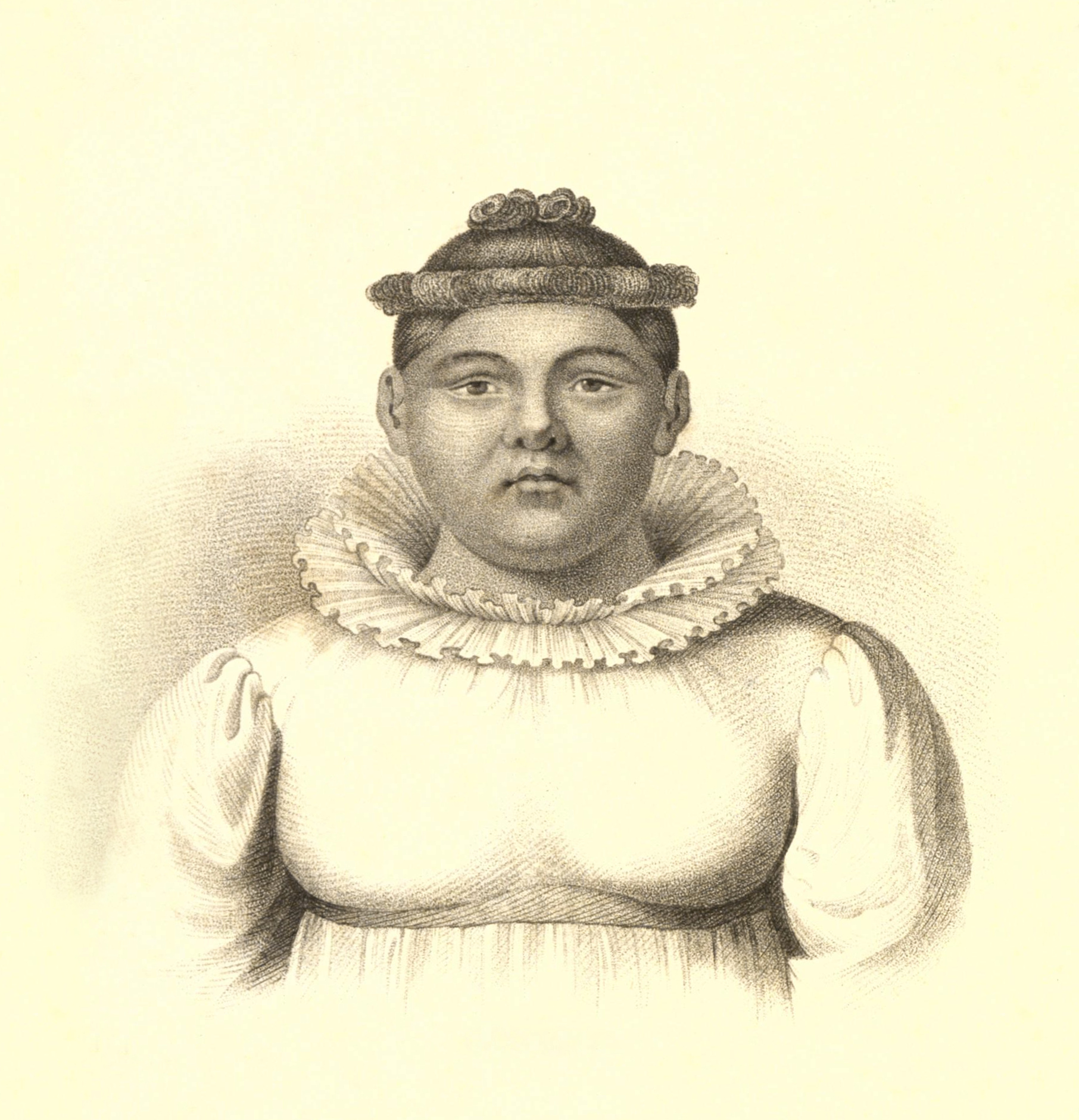
- Portrait of Nāmāhāna Piʻia as "Queen of the Sandwich Islands", published in Otto von Kotzebue's A New Voyage Around the World, 1830.

Governor of Oahu
- Preceded by: Oliver Holmes
- Succeeded by: Boki

Personal details
- Born: c. 1787 Hawaii
- Died: 1829 (aged 41–42) Kingdom of Hawaii
- Spouse(s): Kamehameha I Gideon Peleioholani Laʻanui
- Parent(s): Keeaumoku Pāpaiahiahi; Namahanaʻi Kaleleokalani

Lydia Nāmāhāna Kekuaipiʻia (c. 1787 – 1829) was a wife of King Kamehameha I of Hawaii. She was the daughter of Keʻeaumoku Pāpaʻiahiahi, and her sisters Kaʻahumanu and Kalākua Kaheiheimālie were also Kamehameha's wives. Kamehameha and Kaʻahumanu later arranged Piʻia to marry Gideon Peleioholani Laʻanui, who was ten years her junior. They were married by Hiram Bingham I in a Christian ceremony.

Nāmāhāna Piʻia also served as Governor of Oahu.

== Ancestry ==
Ancestors of Nāmāhāna Piʻia

16. Kauakahilau
8. Lonoikahaupu
17. Kuluina
4. Keawepoepoe
18. Kaneikauaiwilani
9. Kalanikauleleiaiwi (= 29)
19. Keakealaniwahine
2. Keʻeaumoku Pāpaʻiahiahi
5. Kūmaʻaikū
1. Nāmāhāna Piʻia
24. Lonohonuakini
12. Kaulahea II
25. Kalanikauanakinilani
6. Kekaulike
26. ʻUmi-a-Liloa of Maui
13. Papaikaniau
27. Kuʻihewamakawalu
3. NāmāhānaʻiʻKaleleokalani
28. Kauaua-a-Mahi
14. Haʻae-a-Mahi
29. Kalanikauleleiaiwi (= 9)
7. Haʻaloʻu
30. Kaulahea II (= 12)
15. Kalelemauliokalani
31. Papaikaniau (= 13)

Preceded by Oliver Holmes	Royal Governor of Oahu	Succeeded by Boki
