= In the Matter of the Estate of Charles Kanaina =

Litigation over the estate of Charles Kanaina

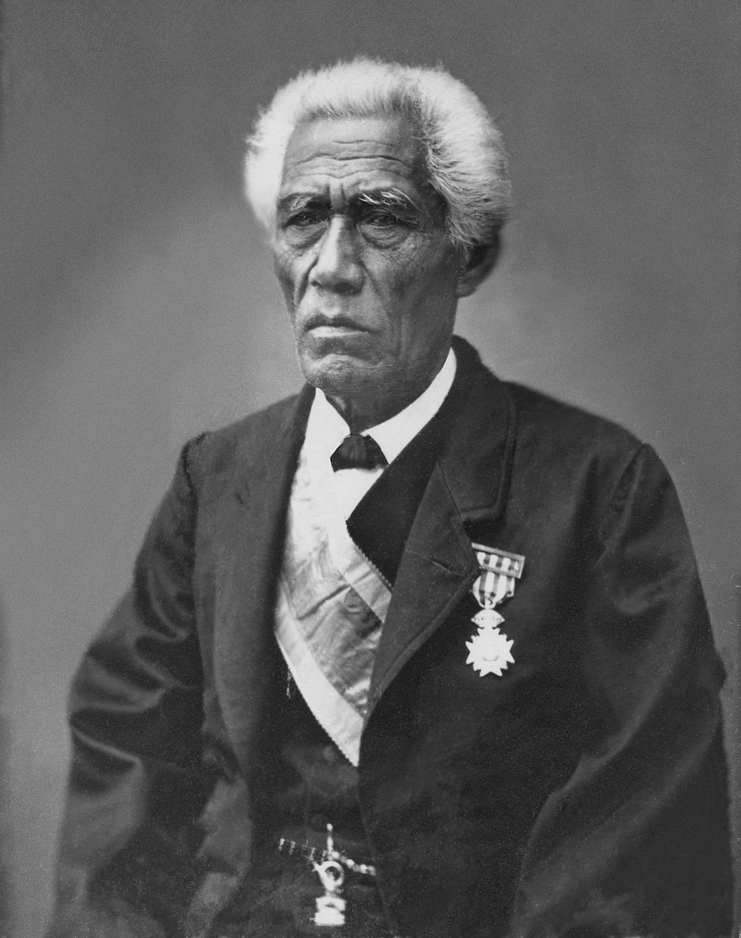
Charles Kanaina, was father of King Lunalilo and the husband of Queen Consort and Kuhina Nui of the Hawaiian Islands, Kekāuluohi as well as uncle to Queen Kalama

In the Matter of the Estate of Charles Kanaina was the litigation over the estate of Charles Kanaina that occurred between 1877 and 1881 brought by claimants under Kanaina's maternal grandmother, Moana and her four husbands, for quiet land titles ending with the adjudication of several heirs.

The Supreme Court of Hawaii handed down several opinions and judgments over several years regarding the estate of Charles Kanaina, who died on March 13, 1877, in Honolulu, Oahu in the Kingdom of Hawaii. Petitions began to be filed the day after the death in probate court and lasted until 1882. Many relatives came forward to petition the courts to be named as an heir. The final adjudication found eight individuals or family groups, largely from Moana Wahine, to be legitimate claims.

== Background ==
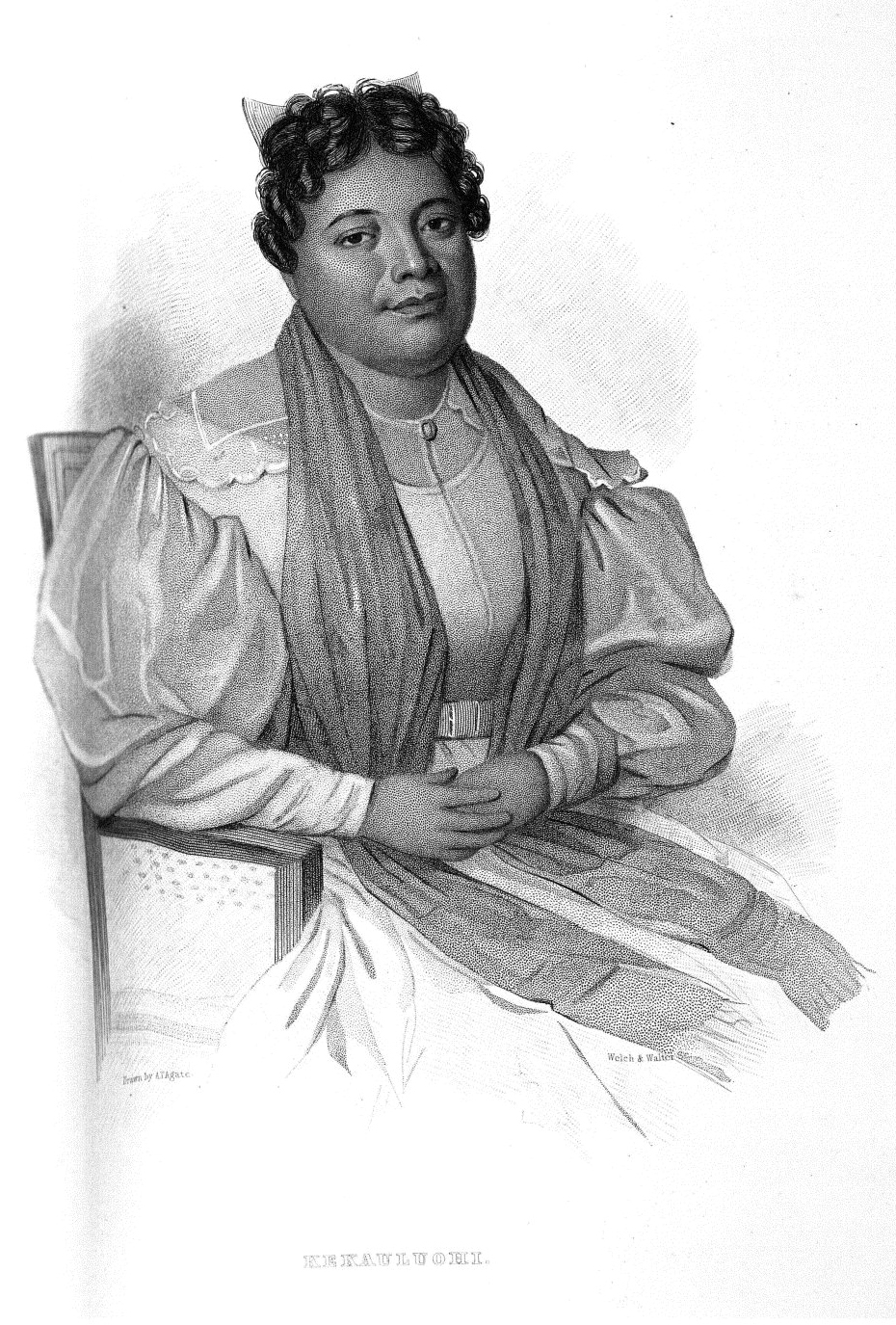
Miriam Kekāuluohi

Charles Kanaina was from a secondary chiefly line however, he was related to the Kamehameha's as a cousin and through marriage to Miriam Kekāuluohi. They had one son who survived to adulthood, William Charles Lunalilo who eventually became monarch of the kingdom shortly before his death. All the lands Lunalilo owned were passed to him from his mother, who was a former wife of Kamehameha I and II. All her lands were handed down from Kalākua Kaheiheimālie, Kekāuluohi's mother, also a wife of Kamehameha I and from the king's half brother, Kalaʻimamahu. Since no child between the union of Kamehameha I and Kaheiheimālie had survived by their mother's death, her lands passed to the woman's only surviving daughter by Kalaʻimamahu, who was Kekāuluohi. Her aunt was Kaahumanu, her mother's sister and another wife of Kamehameha I who was the first Kuhina Nui. Kekāuluohi would also become Kuhina Nui for a short period until the must direct heir to the position, Victoria Kamāmalu came of age. Kekāuluohi collected a number of lands from the position.

Kekāuluohi died June 7, 1845, and left no will that was located. Her lands were split in a matter agreed in court, leaving some land to her son LunaLilo as well as some land to other close relatives. When Lunalio died, between what was already gifted to him from the Mahele, left to him from his mother and purchased (even after giving up a sizable amount) he was the largest land owner of the islands. He died in 1874 leaving a will bequeathing everything to his father during only his life, that would in turn, then be left to Kamehameha V for his lifetime. It was never intended for Kanaina to inherit the lands of his higher ranking wife. After both men had passed with no issue, the remaining lands were to become part of the Lunalilo Trust.

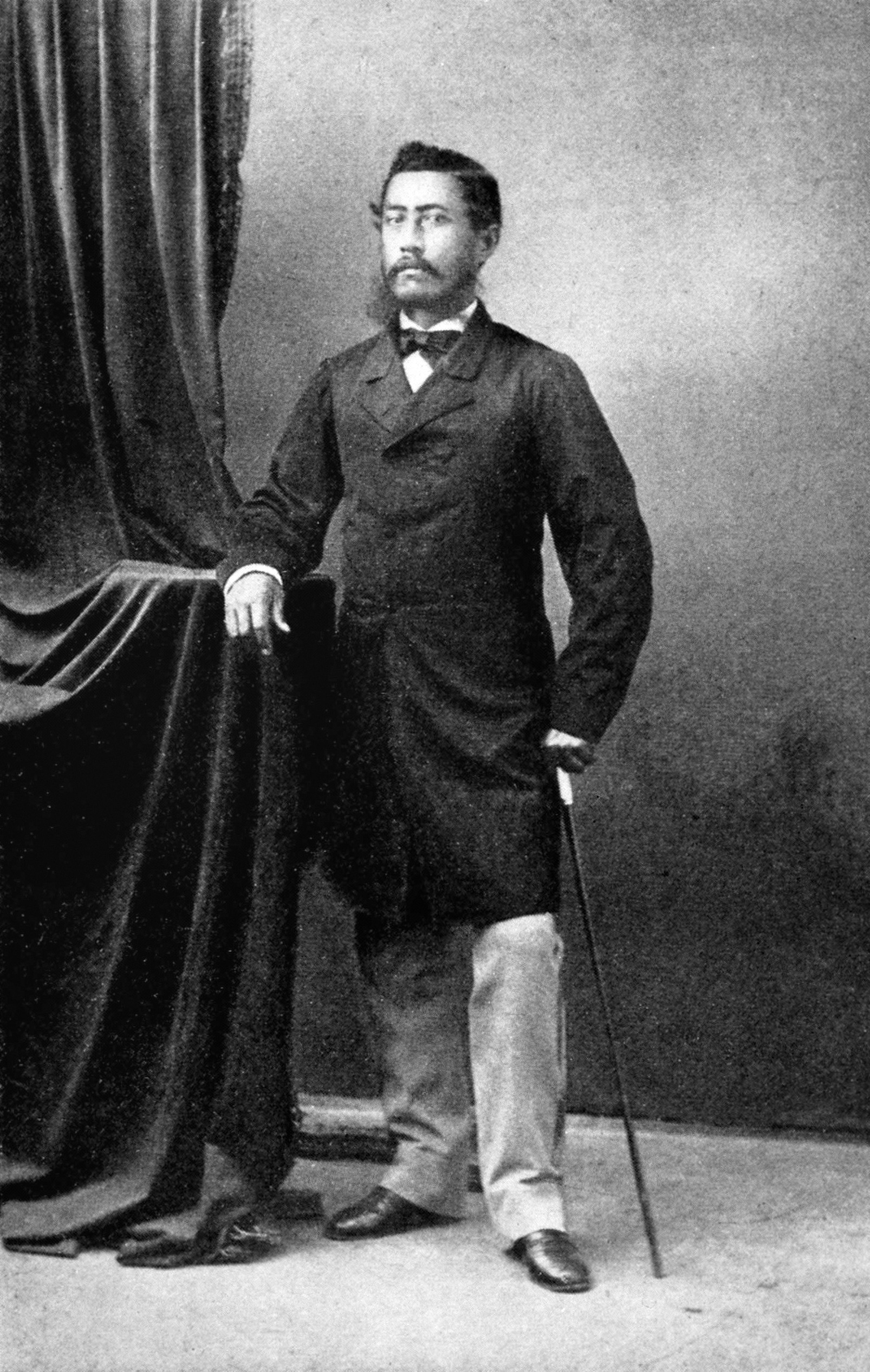
King Lunalilo

The first three trustees included J. Mott Smitth and Sanford B. Dole. The will could not be carried out until after the death of Kanaina since the entire estate was his for life. Kanaina died 3 years later on March 13, 1877. Attorney General, Alfred S. Hartwell applied for the appointment of trustees shortly after the death under the articles of the Lunalilo will. Article three of that will bequeathing the entirety of his estate to be handled by three trustees appointed by the Justices of the Supreme Court of the Hawaiian Kingdom. The property was to be sold and invested until the sum of $25,000.00 was raised to fund a home for the poor and destitute.

== Petitions for letters of administration ==
Hartwell petitioned Chief Justice Charles Coffin Harris for Letters of Administration of the Kanaina Estate to be issued to William C. Parke on March 14, 1877. Harris ordered a hearing for April 5, 1877, to hear the petition pertaining to the estate of the late Charles Kanaina and anyone who could show reason not to grant it. Sanford B. Dole provided a sworn affidavit to the death of Charles Kanaina and of seeing his body at his home at the Palace walk. On March 16, 1877, another Notice of Order of Petition was read and filed by Justice Lawrence McCully for William Stevens Pahukula from his attorney Edward Townsend O'Halloran. An order for a hearing on April 11, 1877, was made but canceled when the Justice discovered another hearing for another petition was already ordered. Pahukula stated that he was the sole heir to the Charles Kanaina estate through Kanaina's sister, who he states was his grandmother and that the estate was indebted to him for over $3000.00.

== First hearing ==
There were many new petitions submitted during the first hearing. New petitions included

- Pahua (w), through attorney Edward Preston
- Kaaua (k) also represented by E. Preston
- Leialoha through E.T O'Halloran,
- Kealalaina Meheiwa and Kauimakaole Lazarus represented by W.C. Jones
- J.S. Kekukahiko and relatives through attorney Kalauli
- Esetera Kipa through Kalaaukane and Mahelona
- Kaaua and Pahaw through attorney's L. Keliipio and Kj Unauma

Various creditors were represented as well, such as the estate of creditor, James Robinson represented by E. Preston. The Lunalilo trust was represented by trustee, Sanford B. Dole. Attorney General Hartwell presented the Last Will and Testament of Charles Kanaina that was in the physical possession of Charles Reed Bishop, also named as the executor of that will which named Lunalilo as the sole heir. Bishop knew of no other will. The court ordered W.C. Parke as the temporary administrator of the estate at that time with a $5000 bond due. An inventory of the deceased's property was also ordered

== Petitions ==
=== William Stephens Pahukula claim ===
William Stephens Pahukula claimed to be an heir through Eia's second wife, Kaheluuaaukai, the mother of Nakookoo, the claimant's mother.

=== Pahau and Kaaua claim ===
Pahau and her husband Kanoelehuaher petitioned the court for administration to the estate based on Pahau's claimed genealogy to Kanaina through Eia, his father, as did Kaaua:

Makakualii (k)	Kapalaua (w)
Kanemano I (k)	Kaikailua (w)	Kekiaokalani (k)	Lihiole	Kalaniookoe (k)	Eia (k)	Kauwa
Kanemano (k)	Kapalani	Eia II (k)	Kapuonohi	Kanaina (k) _{Decedent}	Kekāuluohi
Pahau (w) _{Claimant}	Kaaua (k) _{Claimant}	Lunalilo

Their claims were confirmed by the courts and a distribution of 1/9 of the estate was eventually awarded to them.

=== Leialoha claim ===
Leialoha claimed to be a first cousin of Kanaina on his mother's side through her brother, Keholo, as his daughter.

=== Kealaina and Kauimakaole ===
Kealalaina Meheiwa and Kauimakaole Lazarus filed a petition claiming to be the only issue of Kamoakeawe, a collateral family line from Kana'ina's maternal line.

=== Kalakaua claim ===
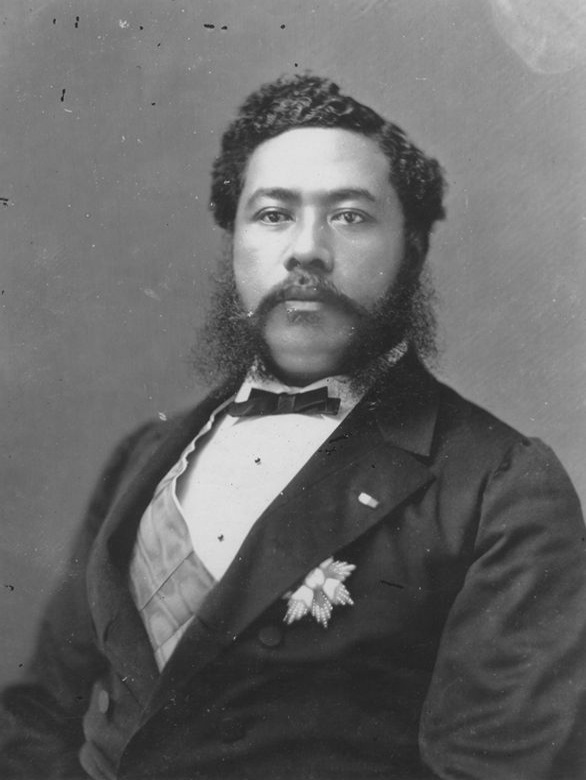
King Kalakaua

A petition was filed by King David Kalakaua, Lydia K. Dominis, Archibald Scott Cleghorn and Miriam K. Cleghorn for quiet title by right of inheritance. A hearing was set by Justice Lawrence McCully. The hearing took place on October 17, of 1877 and further hearings continued the rest of the year with another hearing scheduled for January 26, of 1878.

=== Haalelea, Kahuakaiola, A.W. Haalilio and Kilinahe claim ===
In January another petition was made. Levi Haalelea, Kahuakaiola and A.W. Haalilio filed through their representatives, Jno. Lota Kaulukou. Their petition was through a brother (named Keholo) of kanaina's Mother, Kauwa. In July 1878, Justices Harris, Judd and McCully heard an appeal from the king and his two sisters. On August 17, 1878, they handed down their decision. The Justices felt Kalakaua failed to prove his case, on behalf of himself and his siblings however, they were very impressed with the claim of Kilinahe, Kanaina's first cousin whose first petition was declined as being too late to be filed, but permitted during the case's appeal.

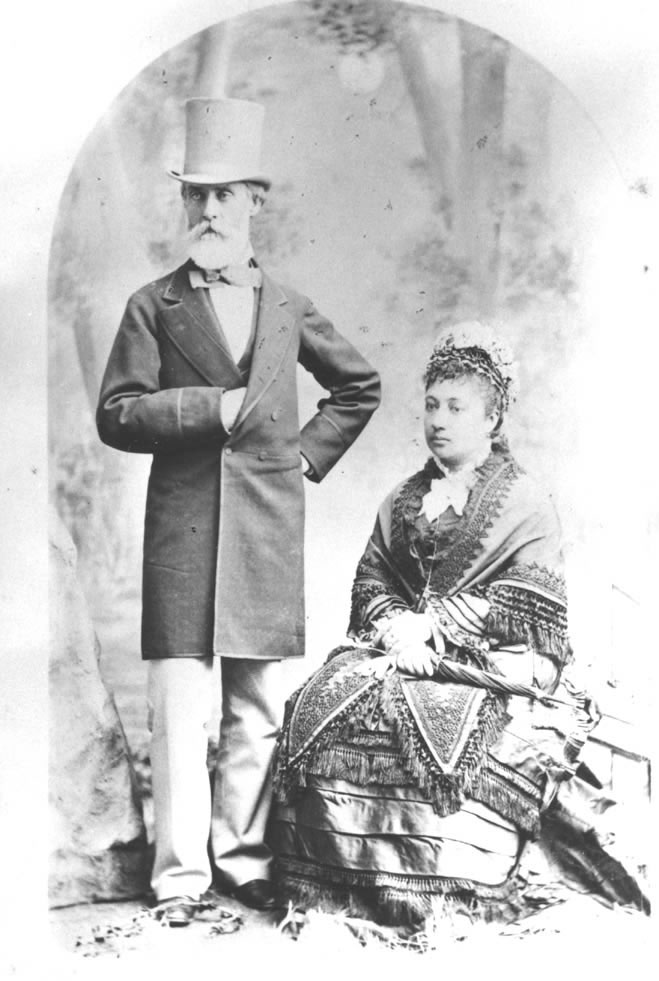
Charles and Bernice Bishop

They felt that Kilinahe had carried himself in the manner of a chief and that his statements, witnesses and genealogy were very strong. They also found in favor of several others. The court decreed for the estate to go to Haalilio (k), Haalelea (k) and Kahukaiola (k), who were to receive one quarter of the estate. The claim of Pahua (w) was granted one quarter share as well as Kaahua (k) who received the same one quarter amount. Kilinahe died before the adjudication of his claim. The court named his widow and children his heirs and allotted them a one quarter share.

Claimants made petitions to the court under the act of 1874 to quite land titles. The act was later deemed unconstitutional and a new decree of heirship was made. By December 1879 disbursement of land in trust with William Cooper Parke, (Marshal of Hawaii from 1853 to 1884) and owned by heirs, could not be agreed upon for settlement. Most supported the sale of the lands, so an order was made and all land sold at auction.

Final adjudication of probate found eight parties as heirs to the Kana'ina estate with some of lesser relationship. Most of the heirs were descended from Moana and one of her four husbands. The probate records include a great deal of information from the 4 years of litigation. A great number of people petitioned the courts to claim title as heir. Final list of heirs includes Bernice Pauahi Bishop, receiving two - 1/9th shares because her genealogy is derived from two separate people who were half siblings. Ruth Keelikōlani, received a single 1/9th share, as did remaining heirs, Haalilio, Haalelea, Kilinahe and 5 other parties.
