= House of Kamehameha =

Royal family of Hawaiʻi

Kamehameha
- Parent house: House of Keoua
- Country: Kingdom of Hawai‘i
- Founded: 1795
- Founder: Kamehameha I
- Current head: Survives only through collateral lines
- Final ruler: Lunalilo
- Titles: King of Hawai‘i; King of the Hawaiian Islands; Joint King of Hawai'i; Kuhina Nui

The House of Kamehameha (Hale O Kamehameha), or the Kamehameha dynasty, was the reigning royal family of the Kingdom of Hawaiʻi, beginning with its founding by Kamehameha I in 1795 and ending with the death of Kamehameha V in 1872 and Lunalilo in 1874. The kingdom continued for another 21 years, until its overthrow in 1893 with the fall of the House of Kalakaua.

== Origins of the Kamehameha dynasty ==
=== Originating lines ===
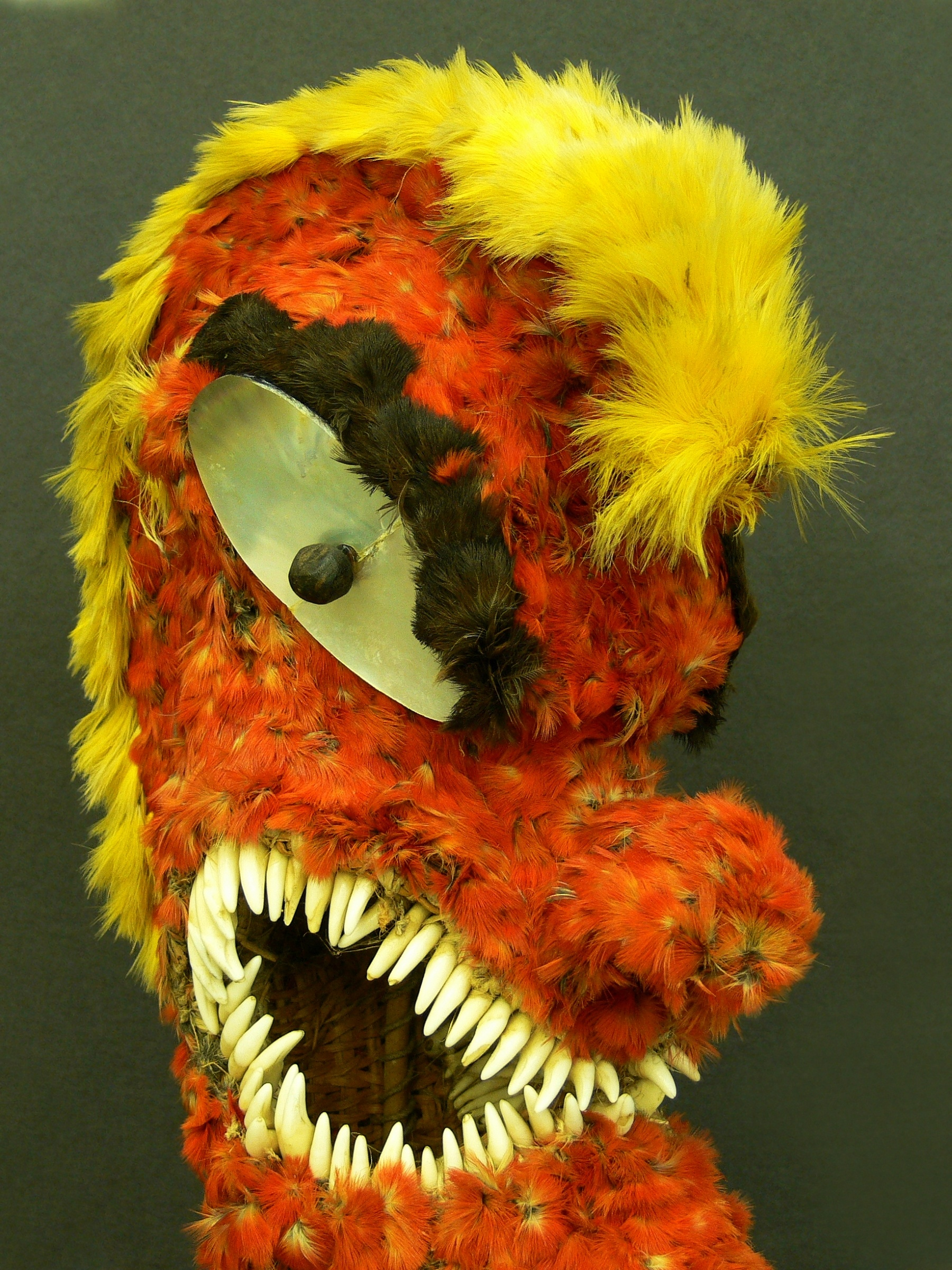
The god Kū-ka-ili-moku was left to Kamehameha I by his uncle Kalaniʻōpuʻu

The origins of the House of Kamehameha stems from the progenitor, Keōua Kalanikupuapa`ikalaninui who was the sacred father of Kamehameha I and by the royal court of his brother Kalaniʻōpuʻu who later became king and gave his war god Kuka'ilimoku to Kamehameha I. Kalaniʻōpuʻu's father was Kalaninuiʻīamamao and Keōua's father was Kalanikeʻeaumoku, both were sons of Keaweʻīkekahialiʻiokamoku. They shared a common mother, Kamakaʻīmoku. Both brothers served Alapaʻinui, the ruling King of Hawaiʻi island at the time. Contemporary Hawaiian genealogy notes that Keōua may not have been Kamehameha's biological father, and that Kahekili II might have been the figure's real father. But official genealogies of the chiefs as well as the rulers themselves confirm that Keōua was the true father. Kamehameha I's mother was Kekuʻiapoiwa II, a granddaughter of Keawe.

Kamehameha I's exact birth date is uncertain. The traditional mele chant of Keaka, wife of Alapaʻinui, indicates that Kamehameha I was born in the month of ikuwā (winter) or around November. Alapaʻi gave the child to his wife Keaka and her sister Hākau to care for. Samuel Kamakau, in his newspaper article writes "It was during the time of the warfare among the chiefs of [the island of] Hawaii which followed the death of Keawe, chief over the whole island (Ke-awe-i-kekahi-aliʻi-o-ka-moku) that Kamehameha I was born". However, his general dating has been challenged. Abraham Fornander writes in his publication, "An Account of the Polynesian Race: Its Origins and Migrations": "when Kamehameha died in 1819 he was past eighty years old. His birth would thus fall between 1736 and 1740, probably nearer the former than the latter". "A brief history of the Hawaiian people" By William De Witt Alexander lists the birth date in the Chronological Table of Events of Hawaiian History" as 1736. He would be named Paiea but would take the name Kamehameha, meaning "The lonely one" or "The one who has been set apart".

Kalaniʻōpuʻu, the young Kamehameha's uncle, would raise him after his father's death. Kalaniʻōpuʻu ruled Hawaiʻi as did his grandfather Keawe. He had a number of advisors and priests. When word reached the ruler that chiefs were planning to murder the boy, he told Kamehameha:

"My child, I have heard the secret complaints of the chiefs and their mutterings that they will take you and kill you, perhaps soon. While I am alive they are afraid, but when I die they will take you and kill you. I advise you to go back to Kohala." "I have left you the god; there is your wealth."

=== Cook's arrival and death ===
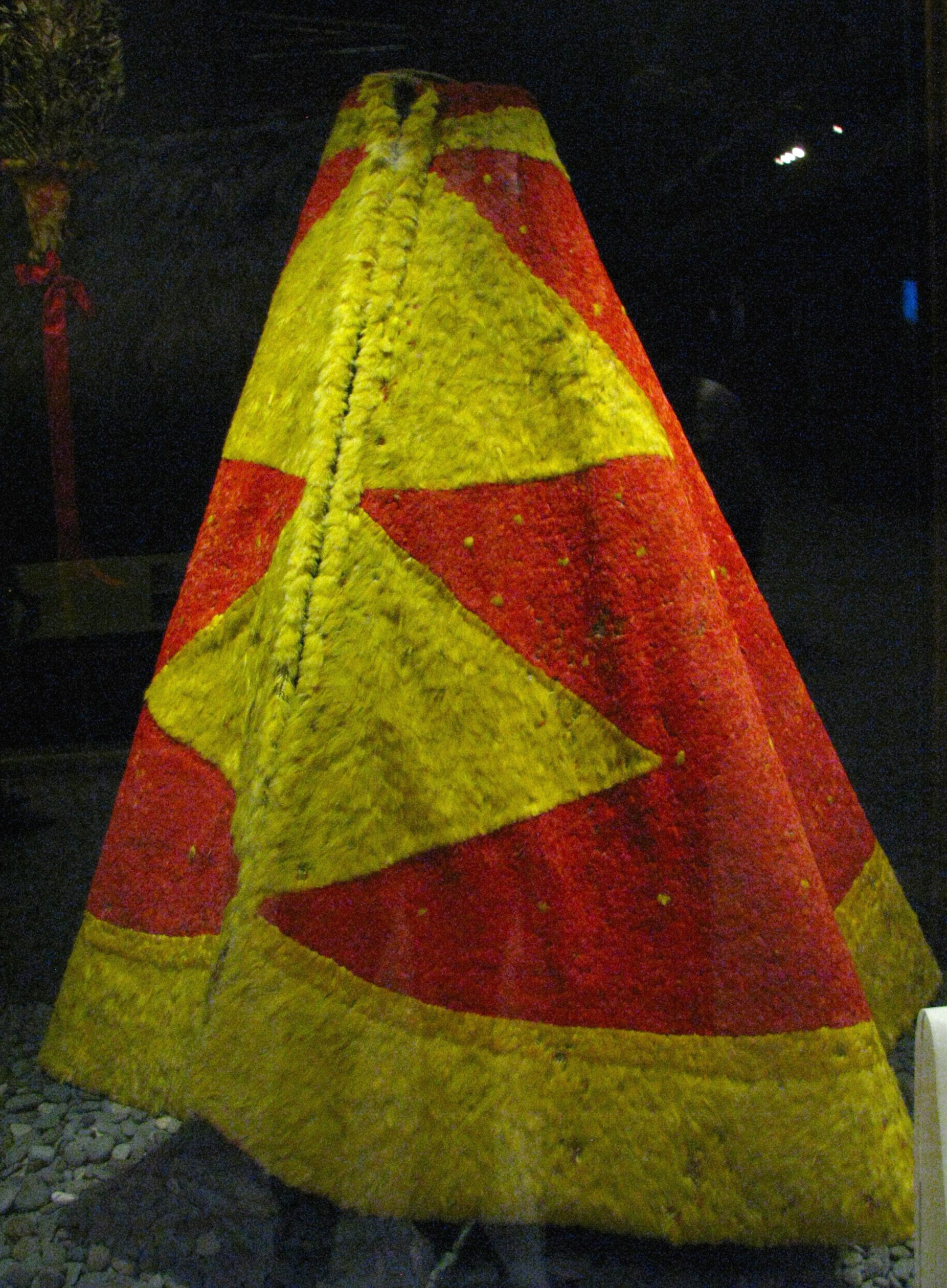
The feathered cloak of King Kalaniʻōpuʻu

In 1778 Captain James Cook visited the Hawaiian Islands and returned in 1779. When his ship, Resolution broke a foremast as they were leaving, he was forced to turn back and return to Kealakekua Bay. A fight and theft of blacksmith tools led to a situation on shore where a Hawaiian canoe was confiscated, even after the tools were recovered. Tensions were high with the Hawaiian population and one of Cook's small boats was taken. In retaliation, Cook decided to kidnap King Kalaniʻōpuʻu. As he was being led away from his royal enclosure, his favorite wife, Kānekapōlei began to shout to the townspeople to get their attention. Two chiefs, Kalaimanokahoowaha (Note: Kalaimanokahoowaha was a grandson of Alapaʻinui however, because of his father's defeat and his mother's chiefly server line, he became a Kaukau aliʻi and served the ruling chief, Kalaniʻōpuʻu.) (also known as Kanaina nui) and a royal attendant named Nuaa, saw her pleading as the King was being led away with his two sons following. As they reached the beach Kanaina, Kānekapōlei and Nuaa were able to convince Kalaniʻōpuʻu to stop and he sat where he stood. The crowd began to become aggressive and a rock was thrown and hit Cook. He took out his sword and struck Kanaina broadside without injury, but the chief reacted and immediately seized Cook and held him in his grip when the king's attendant, Nuaa (Note: It was Nuaa who stabbed Cook.) stabbed him from behind. Before the remains of Cook were returned, the bones of the man were boiled down to strip off the flesh then given to chiefs. Kamehameha received Captain Cook's hair.

=== Kamehameha I, founder of the Kingdom of Hawaii ===
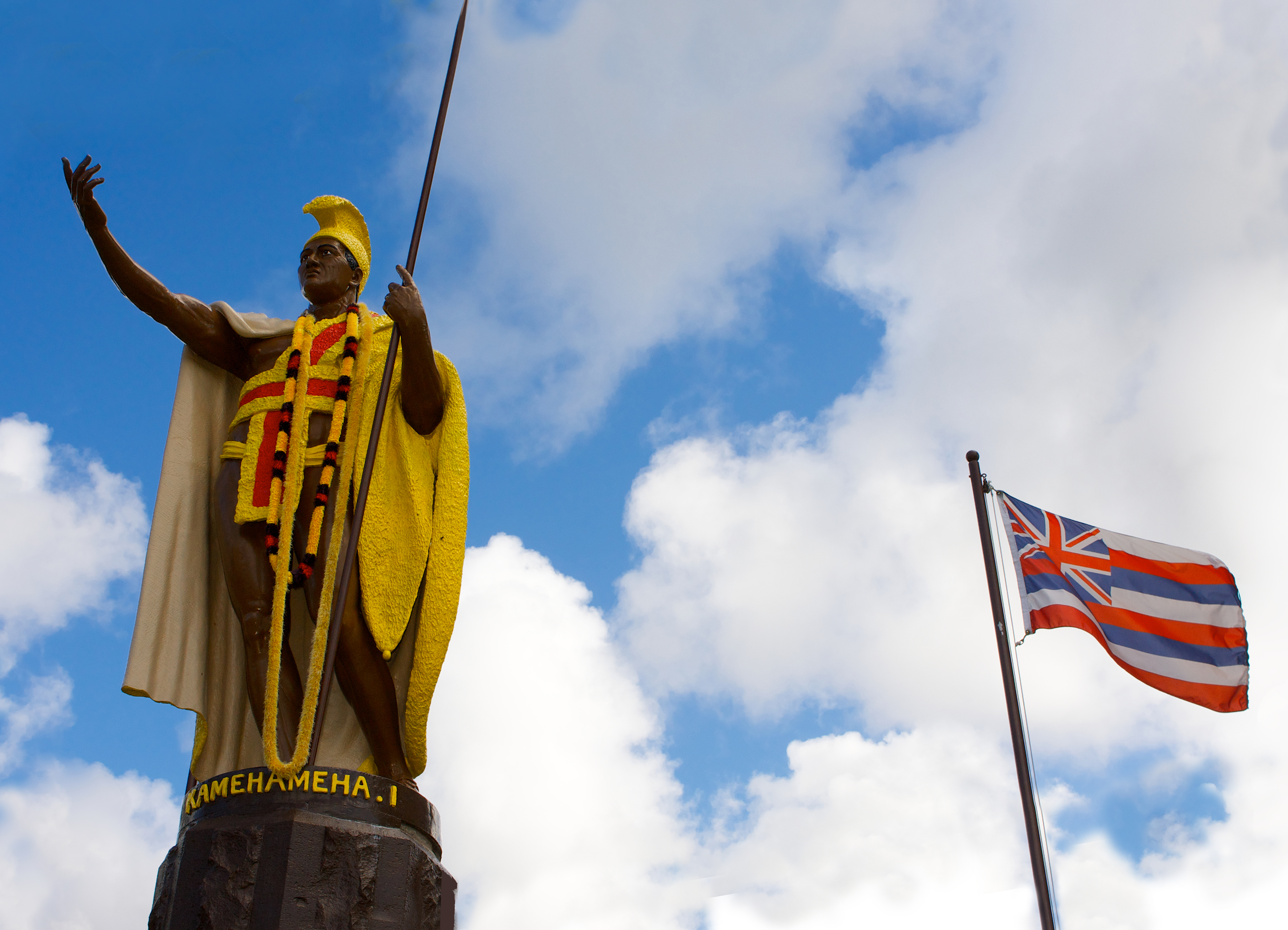
Kamehameha I, founder of the Kingdom of Hawaii.

After Kalaniʻōpuʻu's death, Kīwalaʻō would take his father's place as first born and rule the island while Kamehameha would have religious authority. A number of chiefs supported Kamehameha and war soon broke out to overthrow Kīwalaʻō. After a number of battles the king was killed and envoys sent for the last two brothers to meet with Kamehameha. Keōua and Kaōleiokū arrived in separate canoes. Keōua came to shore first where a fight broke out and he and all aboard were killed. Before the same could happen to the second canoe, Kamehameha intervened. By 1795, Kamehameha had conquered all of the islands but Kauai and Niihau. He would come to control them as well in 1810 when Kaumualiʻi, king of both, formally recognized Kamehameha as his suzerain.

For his first royal residence, the new King built the first western-style structure built in the Hawaiian Islands, known as the "Brick Palace". The king commissioned the structure to be built at Keawa'iki point in Lahaina, Maui. Two foreign, ex-convicts from Australia's Botany Bay penal colony built the home. It was begun in 1798 and was completed after 4 years in 1802. The house was intended for Kaʻahumanu, but she refused to live in the structure and resided instead in a traditional Hawaiian-styled home only feet away.

Kamehameha I had many wives but held two the most high regard. Keōpūolani was the highest ranking aliʻi of her time and mother to his sons, Liholiho and Kauikeaouli. Kaʻahumanu was his favorite. Kamehameha I died in 1819 and his son, Liholiho would become the next king.

== New king and form of government ==
=== Kamehameha II, and the new office of Kuhina Nui ===
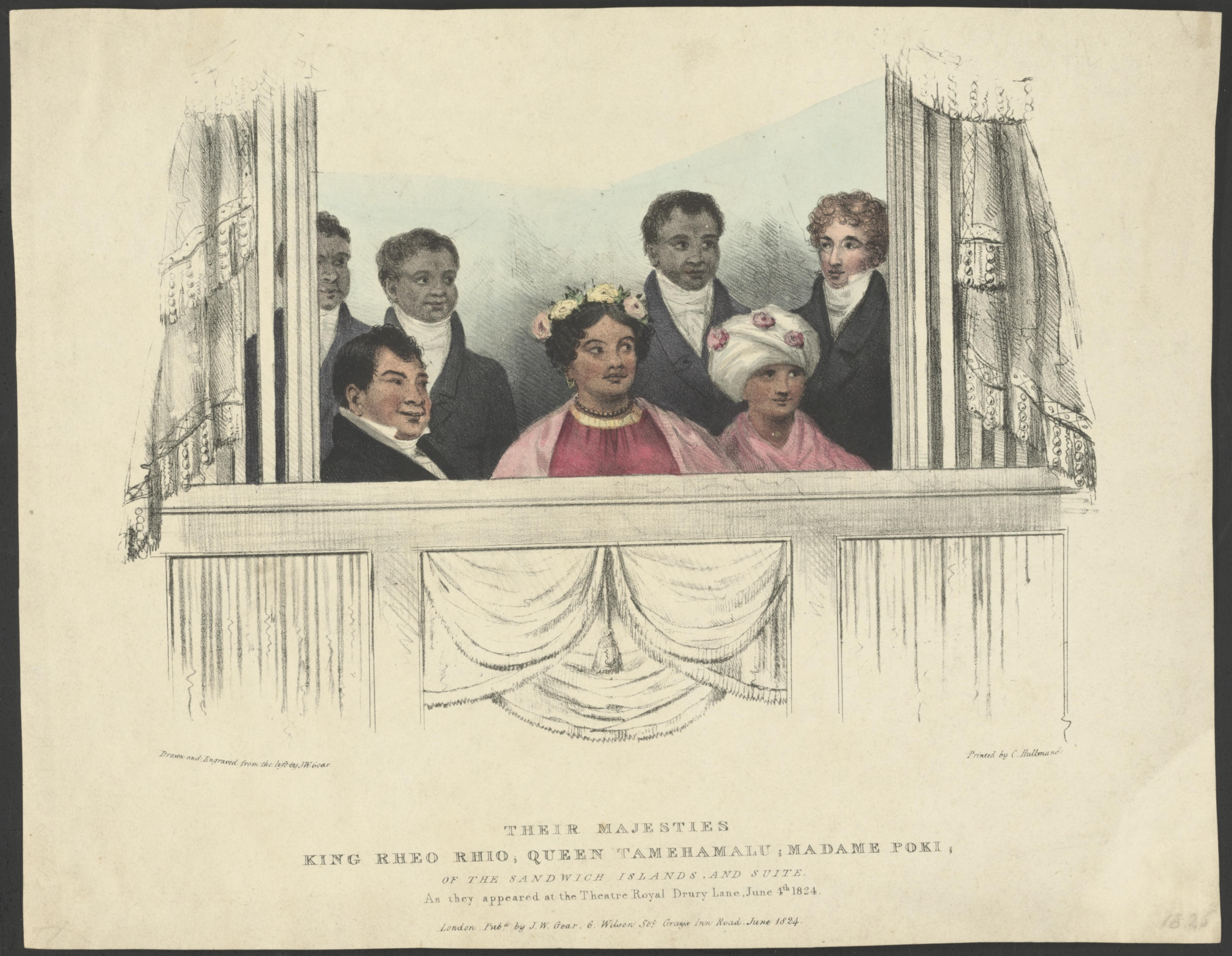
Kamehameha II in England with Queen and entourage

After Kamehameha I's death, his first born son Liholiho left Kailua for a week and returned to be crowned king. At the lavish ceremony attended by commoners and nobles of the kingdom he approached the circle of chiefs, as Kaʻahumanu, the central figure in the group and Dowager Queen, spoke: "Hear me O Divine one, for I make known to you the will of your father. Behold these chiefs and the men of your father, and these your guns, and this your land, but you and I shall share the realm together" Liholiho agreed officially, which began a unique system of dual-government consisting of a King and co-ruler similar to a co-regent. The new Kamehameha II would share his rule with his stepmother, Kaʻahumanu. She would defy Hawaiian kapu by dining with the young king, violating the law separating genders during meals and leading to the destruction of the old Hawaiian religion. Kamehameha II died, along with his wife, Queen Kamāmalu in 1824 on a state visit to England where they succumbed to measles. He was King for only 5 years.

When Kamehameha II and his queen died in England, the remains of the couple were returned to Hawaii by Boki. On board the ship, "The Blond" his wife Liliha and Kekūanaōʻa would be baptized as Christians. Kaʻahumanu would also convert and become a heavy Christian influence on Hawaiian society until her death in 1832. Since the new king was only 12 years old, Kaʻahumanu was now senior ruler and named Boki as her Kuhina Nui.

Boki would leave Hawaii on a fatal trip to find sandlewood to cover a debt and would be lost at sea. His wife, Liliha would be left the governorship of Maui and would unsuccessfully attempt to whip up revolt against Kaʻahumanu, who, upon Boki's departure, had installed Kīnaʻu as a co-governor.

=== Kaʻahumanu ===
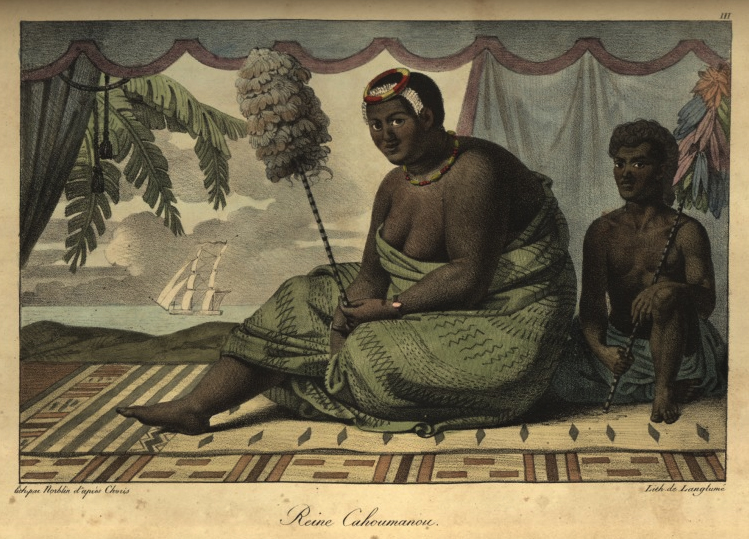
Kaʻahumanu with Charles Kanaʻina

Kaʻahumanu was born on Maui around 1777. Her parents were aliʻi chiefs of a lower ranking line. She became Kamehameha's consort when she was fourteen. George Vancouver states: "[O]ne of the finest woman we had yet seen on any of the islands". To wed the young woman, Kamehameha had to consent to make Kaʻahumanu's children his heirs to the Kingdom although, in the end, she produced no issue.

Before his death, Kamehameha selected Kaʻahumanu to rule along with his son. Kaʻahumanu had also adopted the boy. She had the highest political clout in the islands. A portrait artist remarked of her: "This Old Dame is the most proud, unbending Lady in the whole island. As the widow of [Kamehameha], she possesses unbound authority and respect, not any of which she is inclined to lay aside on any occasion whatsoever". She is one of the most influential leaders in Hawaii's history.

== Kamehameha III, Kaʻahumanu II, III, moi kuʻi, au-puni kuʻi and the Great Māhele ==
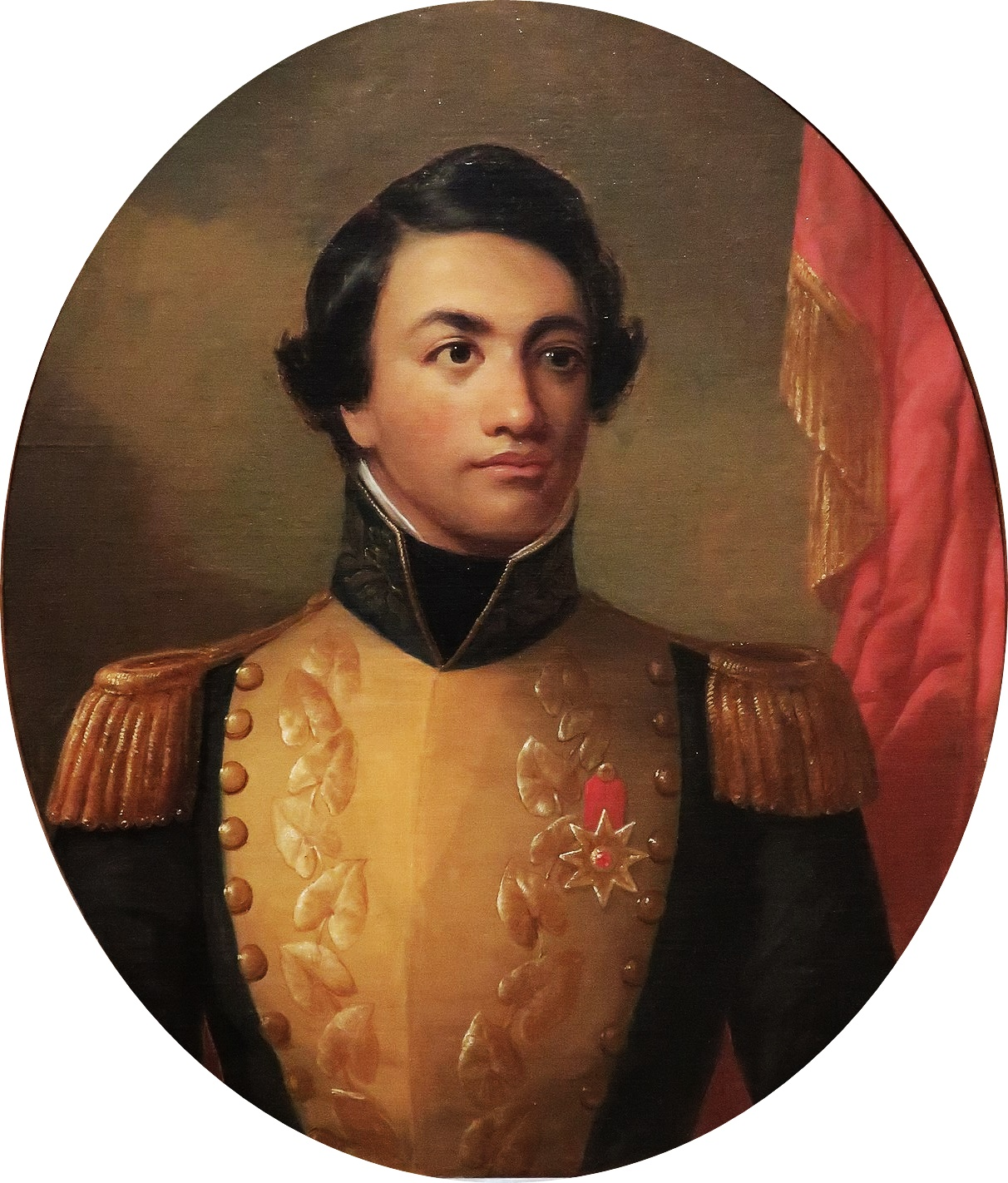
Kauikeaouli at the age of 18

Liholiho's death elevated his younger brother, Kauikeaouli to the throne, styled as Kamehameha III at the age of twelve. When Kaʻahumanu died Kauikeaouli was 18.

With the death of the Kuhina Nui, the young king demanded to come into the possession of his full inheritance. He immediately rebelled against the Christian church and suspended all laws except murder and theft, which was a common tradition after the death of a chief. Distilleries were re-opened and the ban of alcohol lifted as was the ban on Hula. For his co-ruler, Kamehameha chose his aikāne (same sex partner), Kaomi. (Note: Kaomi was Kamehameha III's male lover. Possibly the best example of an aikāne. He was made the "engrafted king",) a young, half Tahitian man who had helped to heal the king and had been a close relationship for years. The church was outraged. Kaomi was granted true authority which he yielded. Eventually Kamehameha III, under pressure from the church, would remove the young man and would name Liliha to be the next Kuhina Nui. In November 1833, Hoapili (Liliha's father), Kekūanaōʻa, Kanaina and Kīnaʻu, along with armed royal attendants, including Kilinahe, went to the king's home to persuade him not to pick Liliha as Kuhina Nui. Hoapili begged the king to kill him if he should choose his daughter so the people would not blame him for her elevation. They pleaded with the king to choose Kinau as a true daughter of the House of Kamehameha. The King agreed and when he sent for Liliha to tell her the news, she was found drunk at home.

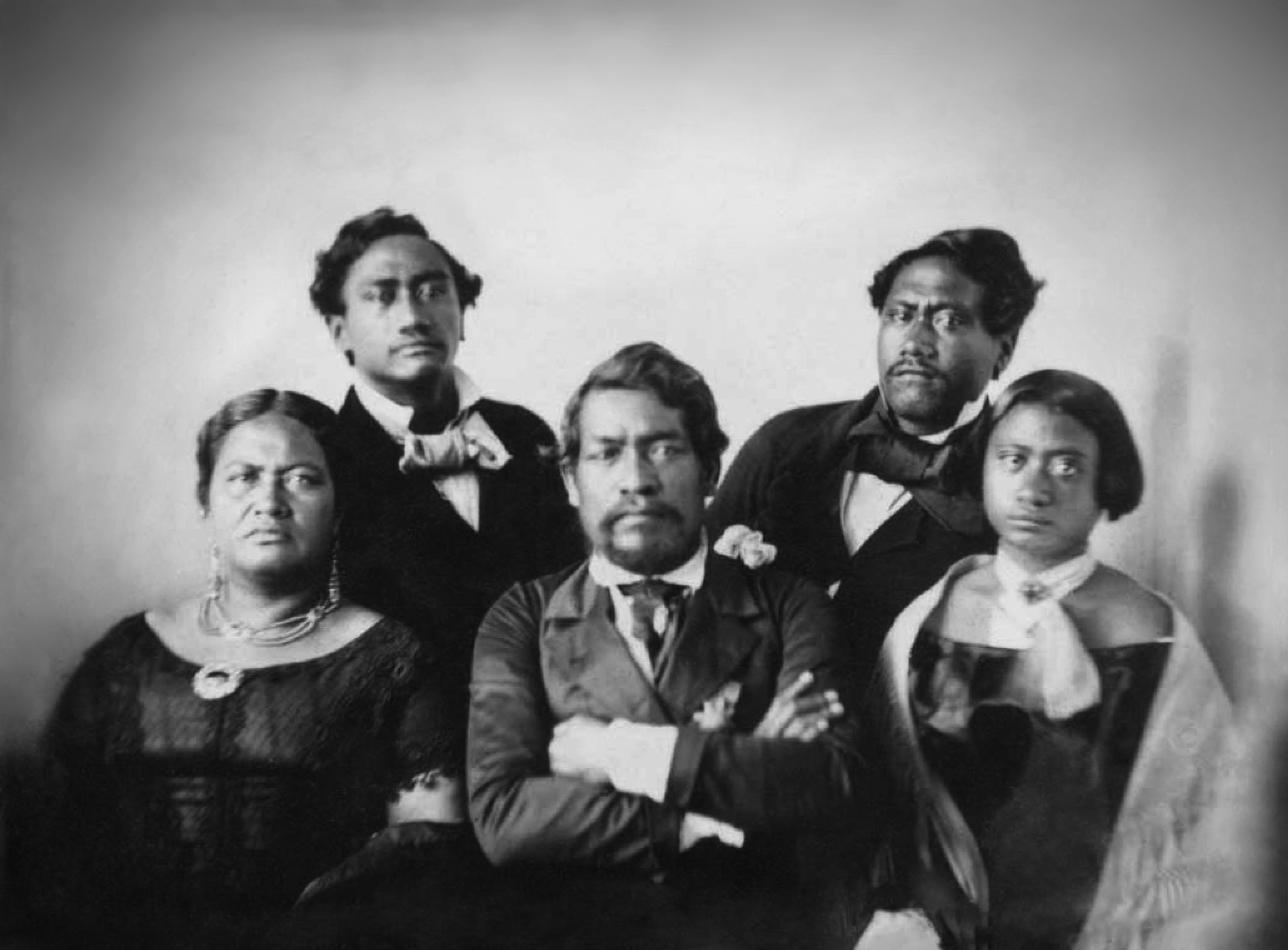
"The Kamehameha Royal Family." Kamehameha III (center) and his wife, Queen Kalama (left); Kamehameha IV (left rear), Kamehameha V (right rear) and their sister, Victoria Kamāmalu (right)

Kīnaʻu would be succeeded by Kekāuluohi as Kuhina Nui, acting for the true heir to the position, Victoria Kamāmalu, Kīnaʻu's infant daughter. Kekāuluohi would be styled as Kaʻahumanu III. After Kekāuluohi died in 1845, the next Kuhina Nui would be Keoni Ana, the son of John Young, one of Kamehameha I's important foreign advisors. Kauikeaouli named an heir, his nephew, Alexander ʻIolani Liholiho who took the throne styled as Kamehameha IV in 1855. The third Kamehameha instituted the Great Mahele, which gave up millions of acres of land passed from his brother, who inherited it from Kamehameha I, leaving all to him as the ruler of the kingdom. Kamehameha III had illegitimate twin sons by Jane Lahilahi named Kīwalaʻō (died young) and Albert Kūnuiākea (1851–1903).

== Kamehameha IV and Queen Emma ==
Alexander ʻIolani Liholiho was the nephew of Kamehameha II and grandson of Kamehameha I. He reigned as Kamehameha IV. Along with his wife Queen Emma, Kamehameha IV would establish the Queen's Medical Center. He was the son of Kīnaʻu, daughter of Kamehameha I and Kekūanaōʻa, a high ranking warrior chief from the conquest of the islands who became Governor of Oahu. He ascended the throne at the age of 21. He was a tall man often described as handsome. His wife was, Emma Naea Rooke, granddaughter of John Young. The couple had one child, a son named Albert Edward Kauikeaouli who died at the age of 4 years old leaving the throne to pass to his uncle.

== Kamehameha V and the last Kamehameha king ==
Lot Kapuāiwa became king in 1863 styled as Kamehameha V. Lot was a bachelor up to his death in 1872 bringing to an end the Kamehameha Dynasty. However, Lot had an illegitimate daughter Keanolani by his classmate Abigail Maheha at the Chiefs' Children's School.

On his deathbed, before his passing, he offered the throne to Elizabeth Keka'aniau and Bernice Pauahi Bishop but they both refused it. Finally, Kamehameha V stated: "The throne belongs to Lunalilo; I will not appoint him, because I consider him unworthy of the position. The constitution, in case I make no nomination, provides for the election of the next King; let it be so." He would die the following morning. This enabled an election from the original stock of ali'i who were groomed for the position to rule by royal decree of King Kamehameha III. The Princes and Chiefs of rank, eligible to be rulers who were groomed at the original Chiefs' Children's School.

== Lunalilo ==
William Charles Lunalilo was the highest chief in the Hawaiian Kingdom of his time. He became the first elected monarch of the Hawaiian Kingdom and would be the last of the Kamehameha dynasty. Lunalilo was the son of Charles Kanaʻina and Miriam Auhea Kekauluohi, a niece of Kamehameha I through her father Kalaimamahu, Kamehameha I's half-brother. However, she was a formal member of the House of Kamehameha as a wife of the founding monarch in his last years. Lunalilo was also a member of the House of Keōua and the House of Moana. His mother was taken by Kamehameha, after her birth and given to Kaʻahumanu because she could not conceive. Kekauluohi was a punalua child, having dual parentage. Lunalilo was the last Kamehameha monarch.

== Family tree ==
Kalaniʻōpuʻu, Kamehameha, Kānekapōlei and Peleuli family tree

Family tree based on Abraham Fornander's "An Account of the Polynesian Race" and other works from the author, Queen Liliuokalani's "Hawaii's Story by Hawaii's Queen", Samuel Mānaiakalani Kamakau's "Ruling Chiefs of Hawaii" and other works by the author, John Papa ʻĪʻī's "Fragments of Hawaiian History", Edith Kawelohea McKinzie's "Hawaiian Genealogies: Extracted from Hawaiian Language Newspapers, Vol. I & II", Kanalu G. Terry Young's "Rethinking the Native Hawaiian Past", Charles Ahlo, Jerry Walker, and Rubellite Kawena Johnson's "Kamehameha's Children Today", The Hawaiian Historical Society Reports, the genealogies of the Hawaiian Royal families in Kingdom of Hawaii probate, the works of Sheldon Dibble and David Malo as well as the Hawaii State Archive genealogy books.

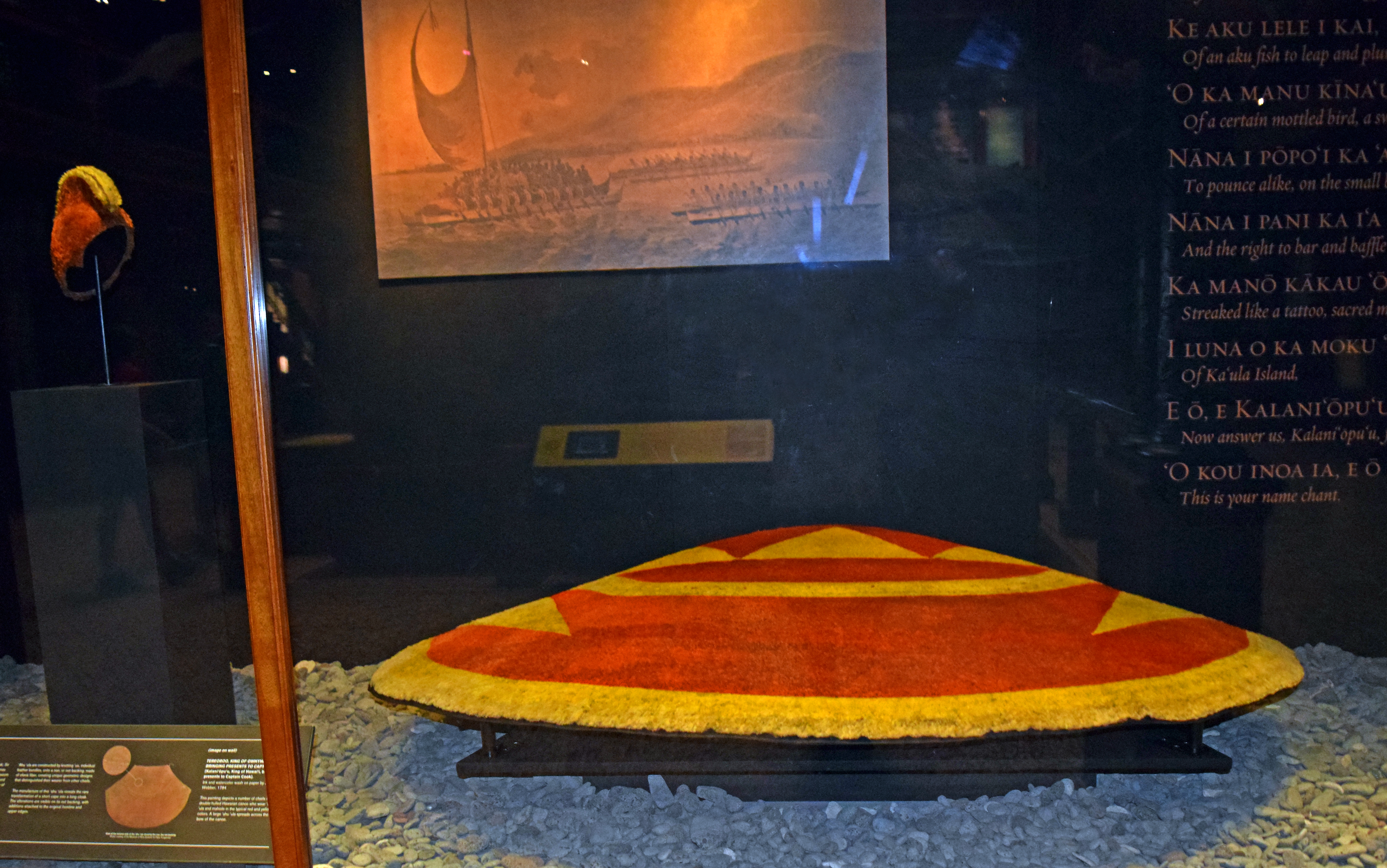
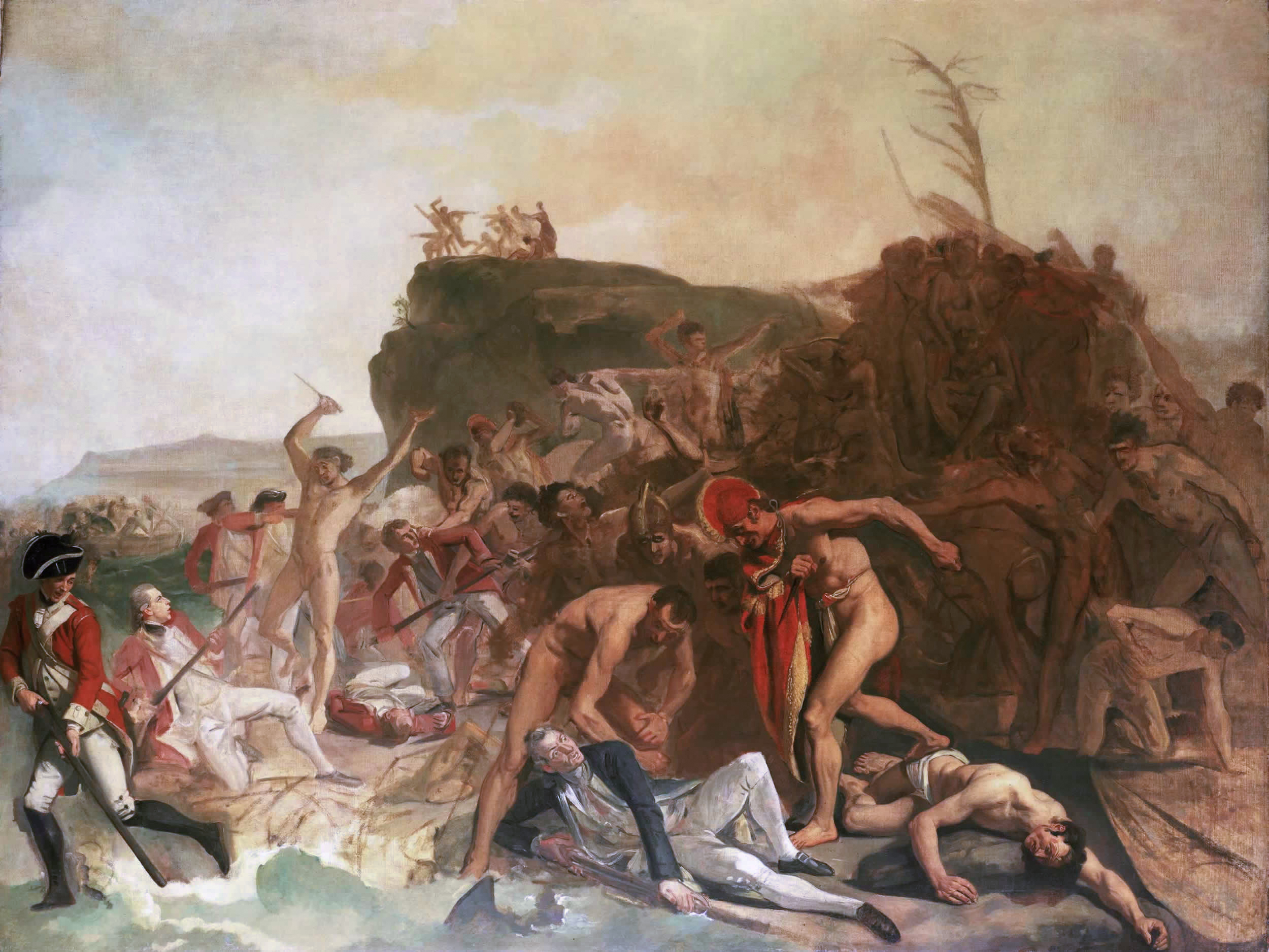
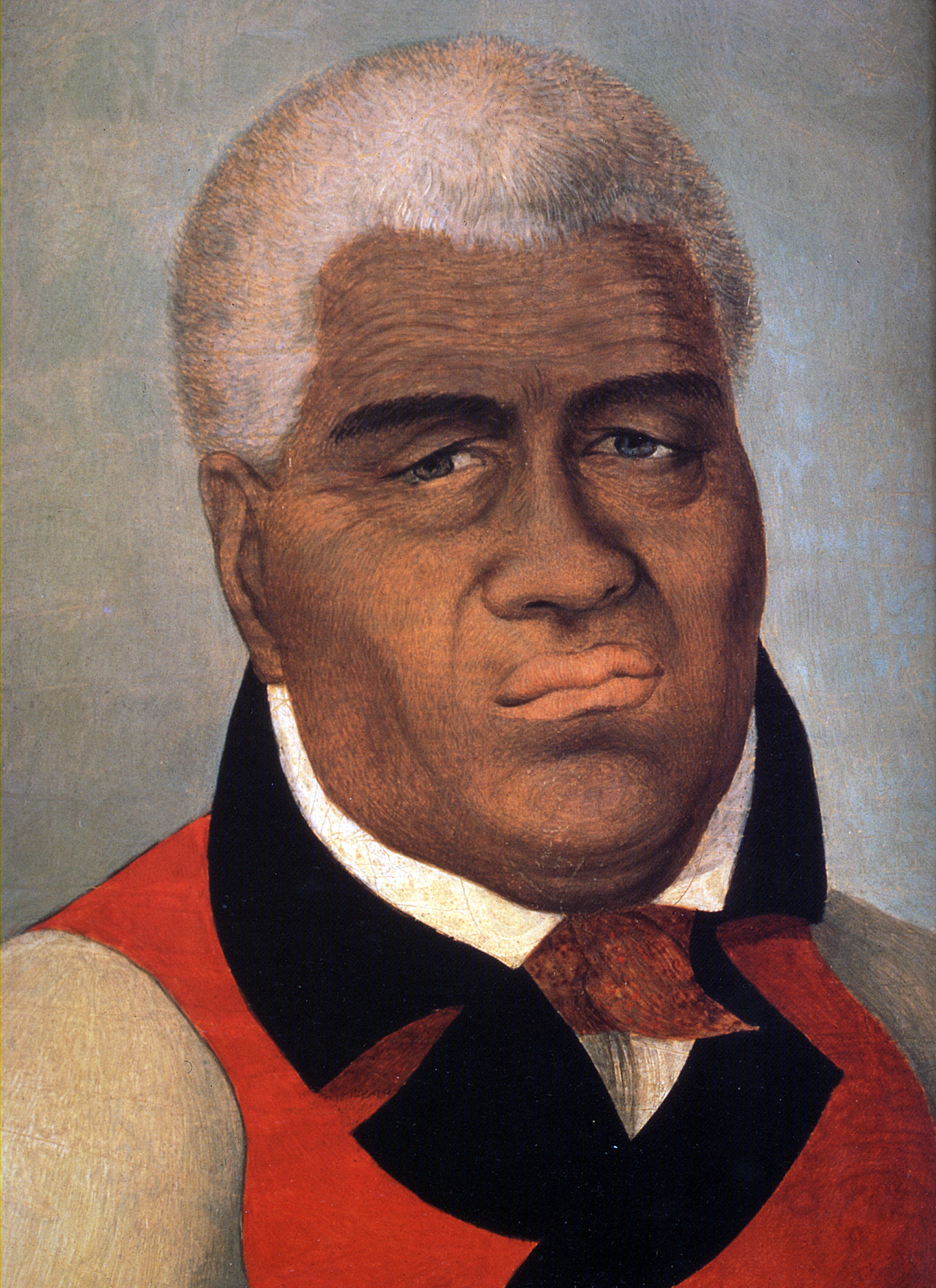
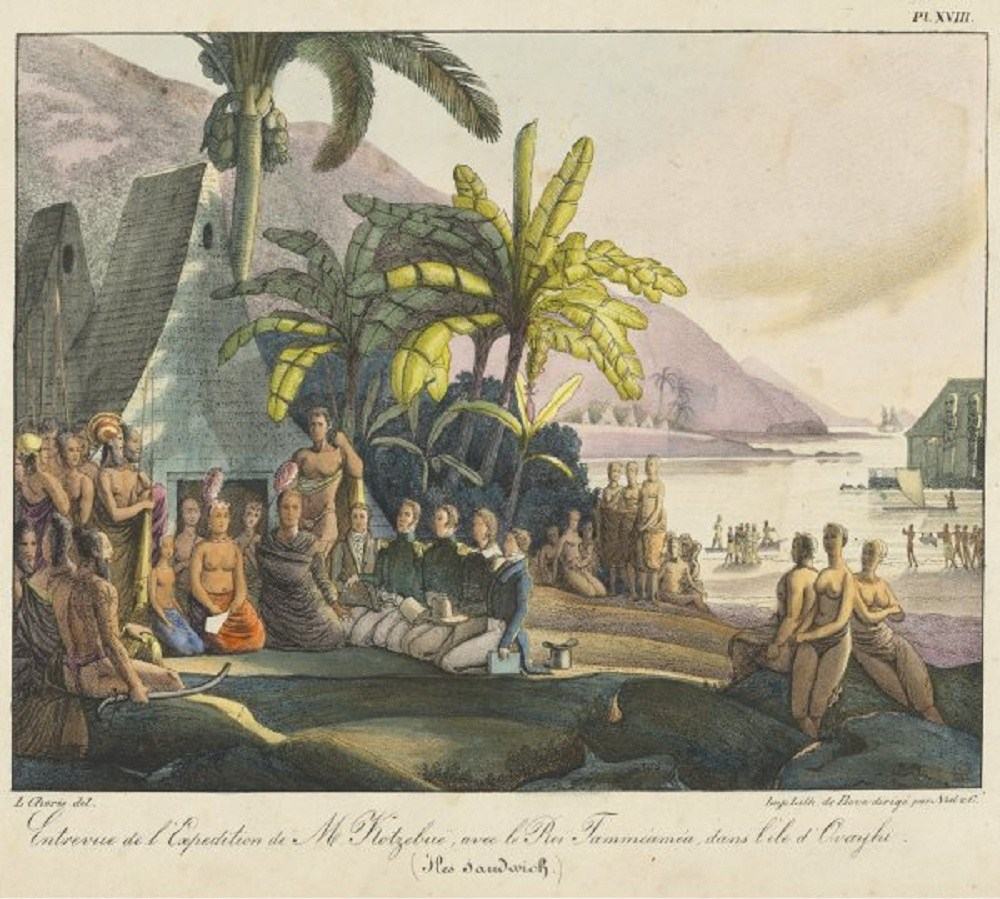
Pinea (w)	Liloa (k) (Note: "The mother of Umi was named Akahiakuleana, and though in humble life, she was a lineal descendant in the sixth generation from Kalahari, moku, the son of Kanipahu, with Hualani of the Nanaulu-Maweke line, and half-brother to Kalapana, the direct ancestor of Liloa. When parting from Akahiakuleana, Liloa gave her the ivory clasp (Palaoa) of his necklace, his feather wreath (Lei-hulu), and his Malo or waist-cloth, and told her that when the child was grown up, if it was a boy, to send him with these tokens to Waipio, and he would acknowledge him. The boy grew up with his mother and her husband, a fine, hearty, well-developed lad, foremost in all sports and athletic games of the time, but too idle and lazy in works of husbandry to suit his plodding stepfather. When Umi was nearly a full-grown young man, his stepfather once threatened to strike him as punishment for his continued idleness, when the mother averted the blow and told her husband, "Do not strike him; he is not your son; he is your chief;" and she then revealed the secret of his birth, and produced from their hiding-place the keepsakes which Liloa had left with her.")	Akahiakuleana (w)	Laielohelohe (w) (Note: Fornander-1880-p.87 "Piilani's children with Laielohelohe were Lono-a-Pii, who succeeded him as Moi of Maui; Kiha-a-Piilani, who was brought up to the age of manhood among his mother's relatives on Oahu; the daughter Piikea, just referred to; and another daughter, Kalaaiheana, of whom no further mention occurs. With another wife, named Moku-aHualeiakea, a Hawaii chiefess of the Ehu family, he had a daughter, Kauhiiliula-a-Piilani, who married Laninui-akaihupee, chief of Koolau, Oahu, and lineal descendant of Maweke through his son Kalehenui. And with still another wife, named Kunuunui-a-kapokii, whose pedigree has not been preserved, he had a son, Nihokela, whose eighth descendant was Kauwa, grandmother of the late King Lunalio on his father's side".)	Piʻilani (k)
Hakau (k)	Kapukinialiloa (w) (Note: Fornander-1880-p.103 "In the domestic relations of Umi, though blessed with a number of wives..." "He is known to have had at least six wives, viz.—(1.) Kulamea, whose family and descent are not reported, and who was the mother of Napunanahunui-a- Umi, a daughter; (2.) Makaalua, whose family has not been remembered, and who was the mother of Nohowaa-a-Umi, a daughter; (3.) Kapukini, a halfsister of Umi, and daughter of Liloa with Pinea, and who was the mother of Kealiiokaloa, a son, Kapulani or Kapukini, a daughter, and Keawenui-a- Umi, a son; (4.) Piikea, the daughter of Piilani, the Moi of Maui, and who was the mother of Aihakoko, a daughter, and Kumalae, a son; (5.) Mokuahualeiakea, descended from the great Ehu family in Kona, and who previously is said to have been the wife of Piilani of Maui. She was the mother of Akahiilikapu, a daughter. (6.) Henahena, said to be descended from Kahoukapu of Hawaii. She was the mother of Kamolanui-a-Umi, a daughter. There is one legend which mentions a seventh wife, named Haua, but her descent and her children are unknown, and her name is not mentioned on any of the genealogies that I possess. Of these eight children of Umi, Kealiiokaloa first, and Keawenui-a-Umi afterwards, succeeded their father as sovereigns of Hawaii".)	ʻUmi-a-Līloa (k) (Note: Fornander-1880-p.228 "There is not a commoner of Hawaii who would say that Umi-a-Liloa was not an ancestor of his, and a man who declines to acknowledge it does so for lack of information. Kapukini-a-Liloa was a royal consort of Umi-a-Liloa, and by whom Umi begat Keliiokaloa, a male, Kapulani, a female, and Keawenuiaumi, a male child. Piikea was a princess, being the daughter of Piilani, king of Maui, with Queen Laieloheloheikawai, and they (Piikea and Umi-a-Liloa) begat two male children, Kumalaenuiaumi and Aihakoko. Moku-a-Hualeiakea was also a princess among the grandchildren of Ehunuikaimalino of Kona, and she had a daughter, Akahiilikapu, by Umi-a-Liloa. He also had Ohenahenalani as wife and begat Kamolanuiaumi, and with the first children by the common women made Umi-a-Liloa the father of many children.")	Piʻikea (w)	Ohenahenalani (w)	Kihapiʻilani (k)	Kumaka (w)	Lonoapiʻi (k)
Keli‘iokaloa (k)	Makuahineapalaka (w)	Koihalawai (w) (Note: Fornander-1880-p.113 "[Keawenui-a-Umi]…" - "[H]is five wives, all of whom were of high and undoubted aristocratic families. These five wives were— (i.) Koihalawai or Koihalauwailaua, daughter of his sister Akahiilikapu and Kahakuma Kaliua, one of the tabu chiefs of Kauai. With this wife Keawenui had four children, three sons and a daughter: Kanaloakuaana, Kanaloakuakawaiea, Kanaloakapulehu, and Keakalavlani. (2) Haokalani, of the Kalona-iki family on Oahu, or from the great Ehu family on Hawaii through Hao-a-kapokii, the fourth in descent from Uhunui Kaimalino; the fact is not very clearly stated, though the presumption, from allusions in the legends, is in favour of the former. Her son was the celebrated Lonoikamakakiki. (3.) Hoopiliahae, whose parentage is not stated,*1 but whose son, Umiokalani, allied himself to the Maui chiefess Pii-maui-lani, and was the father of Hoolaaikaiwi, mother of the widely known and powerful Mahi family on Hawaii. (4.) Kamola-nui-a-Umi, the half-sister of Keawenui. Her daughter was Kapohelemai, who became the wife of her cousin Makua and mother of I, from whom the present reigning family descends. (5.) Hakaukalalapuakea, the granddaughter of Hakau, the brother of Umi. Her daughter was lliilikikuahine, through whom more than one family now living claims connection with the line of Liloa. All the legends mention a son of Keawenui named Pupuakea, who was endowed with lands in Kau, but none of the legends that I possess mention who his mother was. He remained true to Lonoikamakahiki when all the world forsook him, and was treated by Lono as a younger brother or very near kindred.*1 Author's note - "I have but one genealogy in which her parentage is referred to, and there she is said to be a descendant of Huanuikalalailai, through his son Kuhelaui, the brother of the Maui Paumakua.")	Keawenuiaʻumi (k)	Kamolanuiaumi (w)	Hoopiliahae W)	Kaakaupea (w)
Kukailani (k)	Kaohukiokalani (w)	Makuaakumalae (k)	Kapohelemai (w)	ʻUmiokalani (k)	Piʻimauilani (w)	Kamalalawalu (k)
Kanaloakuaʻana (k) (Note: "The children of KaikUani-Alii-Wahine-o-Puna with Kanaloakuaana were a son, Keakealanikane, and two daughters, Kealiiokalani and Kalani-o-Umi. She had no children with Lonoikamahiki, as previously stated. With his other wife, Kaikilanimaipanio, Lono had two sons, one called Keawehanauikawalu and the other Kaihikapumahana, from both of whom her Highness Ruth Keelikolani is the descendant on her father's and mother's sides.")	Kaikilani (w)	Ikanaka (k)	Kawalu (w)	Kanaloauoo (k) (Note: "Kanaloauoo was the ruling chief, the "Alii-ai-moku," he took for wife Hoolaaikaiwi, a daughter of Umiokalani and Piimauilani, and granddaughter of Keawenui-a-Umi. With this last wife he had the two sons Mahiolole and Mahihukui".)	Hoolaaikaiwi (w)	Kauhiakama (k)
Keakealanikane (k)	Kealiʻiokalani (w)	Makakaualiʻi (k) (Note: "To this period of Lono's reign belongs the episode of Iwikauikaua, another knight-errant of this stirring time. Iwikauikaua was the son of Makakaualii, who was the younger and only brother of Kaikilani-A Hi- Wahine-o-Puna. His mother was Kapukamola".)	Kapukāmola (w)	Mahiolole (k)	Kanekukailani (w)	Kalanikaumakaowākea (k) (Note: "Kalanikaumakaowakea had two wives— Kaneakauhi, or, as she was also called, Kaneakalau. With her he had a son, Lonohonuakini, who succeeded him as Moi, and a daughter, Piilaniwahine, who became the wife of Ahu-a-I, of the great I family on Hawaii, and mother of Lonomaaikanaka, the wife of Keaweikekahialiiokamoku and mother of Kalaninuiamamao. - Lonohonuakini's wife was Kalanikauanakinilani, with whom he had the following children:—Kaulahea, a son, who succeeded his father in the government; Lonomakaihonua, who was grandfather to the celebrated bard Keaulumoku; Kalaniomaiheuila, mother of Kalanikahimakeialii, the wife of Kualii of Oahu, and, through her daughter Kaionuilalahai, grandmother of Kahahana, the last independent king of Oahu, of the Oahu race of chiefs, who lost his life and his kingdom in the war with Maui in 1783".)
Keakamahana (w) (Note: "During the time of the revolt of Kanaloakuaana and the Hawaii chiefs against Lonoikamakahiki, it would appear that Iwikauikaua was already a grown-up young man, for he is reported as having espoused the cause of Lono and his aunt Kaikilani". "After this narrow escape Iwikauikaua went to Oahu, and there became the husband of Kauakahikuaanauakane, daughter of Kakuhihewa's son Kaihikapu. He is next heard of in the legends as having visited Maui, where one of his sisters, Kapukini, was the wife of the Moi Kauhi-a-Kama, and another sister, Pueopokii, was the wife of Kaaoao, the son of Makakukalani, and head of the Kaupo chief families who descended from Koo and Kaiuli. He finally returns to Hawaii, where he becomes the husband of Keakamahana, the daughter of his cousins Keakealanikane and Kealiiokalani, and who at their death became the Moi of Hawaii. When Lonoikamakahiki and Kaikilani, his wife, died, they were succeeded as Moi of Hawaii by Kaikilani's son Keakealanikane.") (Note: "The only husband known of Keakamahana was Iwikauikaua, above referred to, and with him she had a daughter called Keakealaniwahine, who succeeded her mother as Moi of Hawaii. With his other wife, the Oahu chiefess Kauakahi-kuaanaauakane, Iwikauikaua had a son, Kaneikaiwilani, who became one of the husbands of his half-sister Keakealaniwahine," "Keakealaniwahine had two husbands. The first was Kanaloaikaivrilewa, or, as he is called in some genealogies, Kanaloakapulehu. His pedigree is not given in any genealogy or legend that I have met with, but he was probably a descendant of Lonoikamakahiki's brother with the same name. The other husband was Kaneikaiwilani, who was the son of Iwikauikaua and Kaukahikuaanaauakane. With the first, Keakealani had a son named Keawe; with the second, she had a daughter named Kalanikauleleiaiwi.")	Iwikauikaua (k)	Ikuaana (w) (Note: Three sisters, Ikuaana, Umiulaakaahumanu and Umiaemoku were ancestors of King Kamehameha I and two families on the maternal side of Queen Liliuokalani. The youngest sister Umiaenaku was an ancestor of both Princess Ruth and Mrs. Bishop through Kanekapolei.)	Kū-a-Nuʻuanu (k) (Note: "Kamakaimoku's mother was Umiula-a-kaahumanu, a daughter of Mahiolole…" "Her father was Kuanuuanu, an Oahu chief, and in her childhood and youth she was brought up by her father on Oahu, her mother having gone back to Hawaii and espoused Kapahi-a-Ahu-Kane, the son of Ahu-a-I, and a younger brother of Lonomaaikanaka, the wife of Keawe. With Kuanuuanu Umiulaakaahumanu had another child, a son named Naili, who remained on Oahu, and followed his father as chief over the Waianae district".)	ʻUmiʻulaakaʻahumanu (w)	Ahu-a-ʻI (k)	Piʻilaniwahine II (w)
Kāneikaiwilani (k)	Keākealaniwahine (w)	Kanaloakapulehu (k)
Kauaua-a-Mahi (k) (Note: "[W]hen Kamehameha died in 1819 he was past eighty years old. His birth would thus fall between 1736 and 1740, probably nearer the former than the latter. His father was Kalanikupua-keoua, the half-brother of Kalaniopuu above referred to, and grandson of Keawe; his mother was Kekuiapoiwa II, a daughter of Kekelakekeokalani-a-keawe and Haae, the son of Kalanikauleleiaiwi and Kauaua-aMahi, and brother to Alapainui".)	Lonoikahaupu (k) (Note: "Whether Lonoikahaupu stopped on Oahu or Maui, or, if so, what befell him there, is not known; but on arriving at Hawaii he found that the court of Keaweikekahialiiokamoku, the Moi of Hawaii, was at the time residing in Kau. Eepairing thither, he was hospitably received, and his entertainment was correspondingly cordial, as well as sumptuous. The gay and volatile Kalanikauleleiaiwi, the imperious and high-born wife of Keawe, the Moi, became enamoured of the young Kauai chief, and after a while he was duly recognised as one of her husbands. From this union was born a son called Keawepoepoe, who became the father of those eminent Hawaii chiefs, Keeaumokupapaiahiahi, Kameeiamoku, and Kamanawa, who placed Kamehameha I. on the throne of Hawaii.")	Kalanikauleleiaiwi (w) (Note: "When grown up, Kamakaimoku was seen by Kalaninuiamamao on his visit to Oahu, and sent for to be his wife. Living with him at the court of Keawe, she bore him a son, Kalaniopuu, who afterwards became the Moi of Hawaii. This union was not of long duration, for within a year or two she left Kalaninuiamamao and became the wife of his brother, Kalanikeeaumoku, and to him she bore another son, Kalanikupuapaikalaninui Keoua, the father of Kamehameha I".) (Note: "Keawe s wives were—(1) Lonomaaikanaka, a daughter of Ahu-a-I and of Piilaniwahine. The former belonged to the powerful and widely spread I family of Hilo; the latter was the daughter of Kalanikaumakaowakea, the Moi of Maui. With her Keawe had two sons, Kalaninuiomamao and Kekohimoku} (2.) Kalanikauleleiaiwi, his half-sister, as before stated. With her he had Kalanikeeaumoku, a son, and Kekelakekeokalani, a daughter. (3.) Kanealae, a daughter of Lae, chief of the eastern parts of".)	Keaweʻīkekahialiʻiokamoku (k) (Note: "Keawe, surnamed "ikekahialiiokamoku," succeeded his mother, Keakealaniwahine, as the Moi of Hawaii. He is said to have been an enterprising and stirring chief, who travelled all over the group, and obtained a reputation for bravery and prudent management of his island. It appears that in some manner he composed the troubles that had disturbed the peace during his mother's time. It was not by force or by conquest, for in that case, and so near to our own times, some traces of it would certainly have been preserved on the legends. He probably accomplished the tranquillity of the island by diplomacy, as he himself married Lonomaaikanaka, the daughter of Ahua-I, and he afterwards married his son Kalaninuiomamao to Ahia, the granddaughter of Kuaana-a-I and cousin to Kuahuia's son, Mokulani, and thus by this double marriage securing the peace and allegiance of the Hilo chiefs.")	Lonomaʻaikanaka (w)	ʻUmiaemoku (w) (Note: "Kanekapolei is claimed by some to have been the daughter of Kauakahiakua, of the Maui royal family, and his wife Umiaemoku; by others she is said to have been of the Kau race of chiefs".)
Haʻae-a-Mahi (k) (Note: Kamakau-1992-p.68 "His mother was Ke-kuʻi-apo-iwa, daughter of Kekela and Haʻae, both of whom belonged to families of chiefs. His father was Keoua, younger brother of Ka-lani-ʻopuʻu, Ka-makaʻi-moku being the mother of both.")	Kekelakekeokalani (w)	Keawepoepoe (k)	Kanoena (w)	Kalanikeeaumoku (k)	Kalaninuiamamao (k)	Kamakaimoku (w)
Kekuʻiapoiwa II (w)	Keōua (k)	Kalaniʻōpuʻu (k)	Mahihelelima (k)	Kānekapōlei (w)
Kamehameha I

Kunuunuiakapokii (w)
Kealanaawaauli (w)
Nihokela (k)
Piʻilaniwahine I (w)
Kapukini III (w)
Kaneakauhi (w)
Lonohonuakini (k)	Kalanikauanakinilani (w)
Lonomakaihonua (k) (Note: In her book; "Hawaiian Genealogies: Extracted from Hawaiian Language Newspapers, Volume 2", Edith Kawelohea McKinzie states that the DeFries genealogy to Kauakahiakua was not supported by any accepted genealogy recorded and the correct parents were Lonomakaihonua and Kapoohiwi.)	Kapoohiwi (w)
Kauakahiakua (k) (Note: "Up to this period Kamehameha had had but two recognised wives. One was Kalola, referred to on page 201; the other was Peleuli. Her parents were Kamanawa and Kekelaokalani. The former a son of Keawepoepoe and grandson of Kalanikauleleiaiwi, of the royal Hawaii family, and the latter a daughter of Kauakahiakua and Kekuiapoiwa-Nui, both of the royal Maui family. With this Peleuli Kamehameha had four children:—(1.) Maheha Kapulikoliko, a daughter, of whom nothing more is known; (a) Kahoanoku Kinau, a son, whose wife was Kahakuhaakoi, a daughter of Kekuamanoha, of the Maui royal family, with whom he had a daughter, Keahikuni Kekauonohi, who died in 1847; (3.) Kaikookalani, a son, whose wife was Haaheo, a niece of Keawemauhili by his sister Akahi, and who afterwards became the wife of Kuakini, one of the brothers of Kaahumanu; (4.) Kiliwehi, a daughter, who became the wife of Kamehamehakauokoa".)	Kekuiapoiwa I (w)
Kamanawa (k)	Kekelaokalani (w)
Peleuli (w)

Explanatory notes and reference sources

Notes:

Kalākaua family tree

Key- (k)= Kane (male/husband)
(w)= wahine (female/wife)
Subjects with bold titles, lavender highlighted, bold box= Direct bloodline
Bold title, bold, grey box= Aunts, uncles, cousins line
Bold title, bold white box= European or American (raised to aliʻi status by marriage or monarch's decree)
Regular name and box= makaʻāinana or untitled foreign subject

Kāneikaiwilani (k)
Lonoikahaupu (k)
Keawepoepoe (k)
Kameʻeiamoku (k)
Kepoʻokalani (k)
Kamanawa II (k)
Kapaʻakea (1815–1866)
Kaliokalani (1835–1852)

Kanalohanaui (k)	Keākealani (w)	Ahu-a-ʻI (k)	Piʻilani (w) II	Moana (k)
Kalanikauleleiaiwi (w)	Kauauaʻamahi (k)	Keawe II (k)	Lonomaʻaikanaka (w)	Kauhiahaki (k)	ʻIliki-ā-Moana (w)
Kanoena (w)	Haʻaeamahi (k)	Kekelakekeokalani (w)	Alapaʻi Nui (k)	Keaka (w)	Keeaumoku Nui (k)	Kamakaimoku (w)	Kaeamamao (k) (Note: Genealogy of Liliuokalani, page 400, appendix B, No. 2 Queen of Hawaii, Liliuokalani (1898). Hawaii's Story by Hawaii's Queen. University of Hawaii Press. p. 400. "Kapaakea genealogy.")	Kaolanialiʻi (w)
Kamakaʻeheikuli (w)	Keōua (k)	Kahekili II (k)	Kekuiapoiwa II (w)	Ikuaʻana (w)	Heulu (k)	Moana (w)	Keaweʻopala (k)	Nohomualani (k)
Keaweaheulu (k)	Ululani (w)	Hakau (w)	Kanaʻina (k)	Kauwa (w)	Eia (k)
Alapai (w)	Keohohiwa (w)	Keōpūolani (w)	Kamehameha I	Kalaniʻōpuʻu (k)	Kānekapōlei (w)	Kiʻilaweau (k)	Nāhiʻōleʻa (k)	Kahoʻowaha II (w)	Inaina (w)
Hao (K)	Kailipakalua (w)
Kamokuiki (w)	ʻAikanaka (k)	Kamaeokalani (w)	Kaōleiokū (k)	Keoua (w)	Luahine (w)	Kalaʻimamahu	Kaheiheimālie
Kamehameha II	Kamehameha III	Kekūanaōʻa (k)	Kahalaiʻa; Luanuʻu (k)	Pauahi (w)	Kīnaʻu (w)	Pākī (k)	Kōnia (w)	Kanaʻina II	Kaʻahumanu III
Keohokālole (1816–1869)	Keʻelikōlani (w)	Kamehameha IV	Kamehameha V	Kaʻahumanu IV	Pauahi Bishop (w)	Bishop (k)	Lunalilo (k)
Kalākaua (1836–1891)	Kapiʻolani (1834–1899)	Liliʻuokalani (1838–1917)	Dominis (1832–1891)	Kaʻiulani (1842–?)	Kaʻiminaʻauao (1845–1848)	Cleghorn (1835–1910)	Likelike (1851–1887)	Leleiohoku II (1854–1877)
Kaʻiulani (1875–1899)

== Legacy ==
The British name of the "Sandwich Islands" was replaced with "Hawaiʻi" due to the influence of the House of Kamehameha.

A good portion of the legacy of the Kamehamehas' lies in the lands and fortunes passed down to Bernice Pauahi Bishop. After her death in 1884, her husband, Charles Bishop, acting as one of five trustees and a co-executer of Pauahi's will, began the process of establishing the Kamehameha Schools which was founded in 1887. Charles Bishop would serve as president of the Board of trustees for the Bernice Pauahi Bishop Estate, a perpetual trust with Kamehameha Schools the sole beneficiary, and gave back to the estate all lands deeded to him during his life and helped fund the first structures of the school out of his own money. In 1889, the Bernice Pauahi Bishop Museum was founded and endowed by Charles Bishop as a repository for the priceless Hawaiian artifacts from Pauahi's family. Princess Ruth Ke'elikōlani was the daughter of Pauahi and Mataio Kekūanaōʻa, and a governess of the Big Island of Hawai'i.
