= Kalaimanokahoʻowaha =

High chief of Hawai'i during Captain James Cook's visit

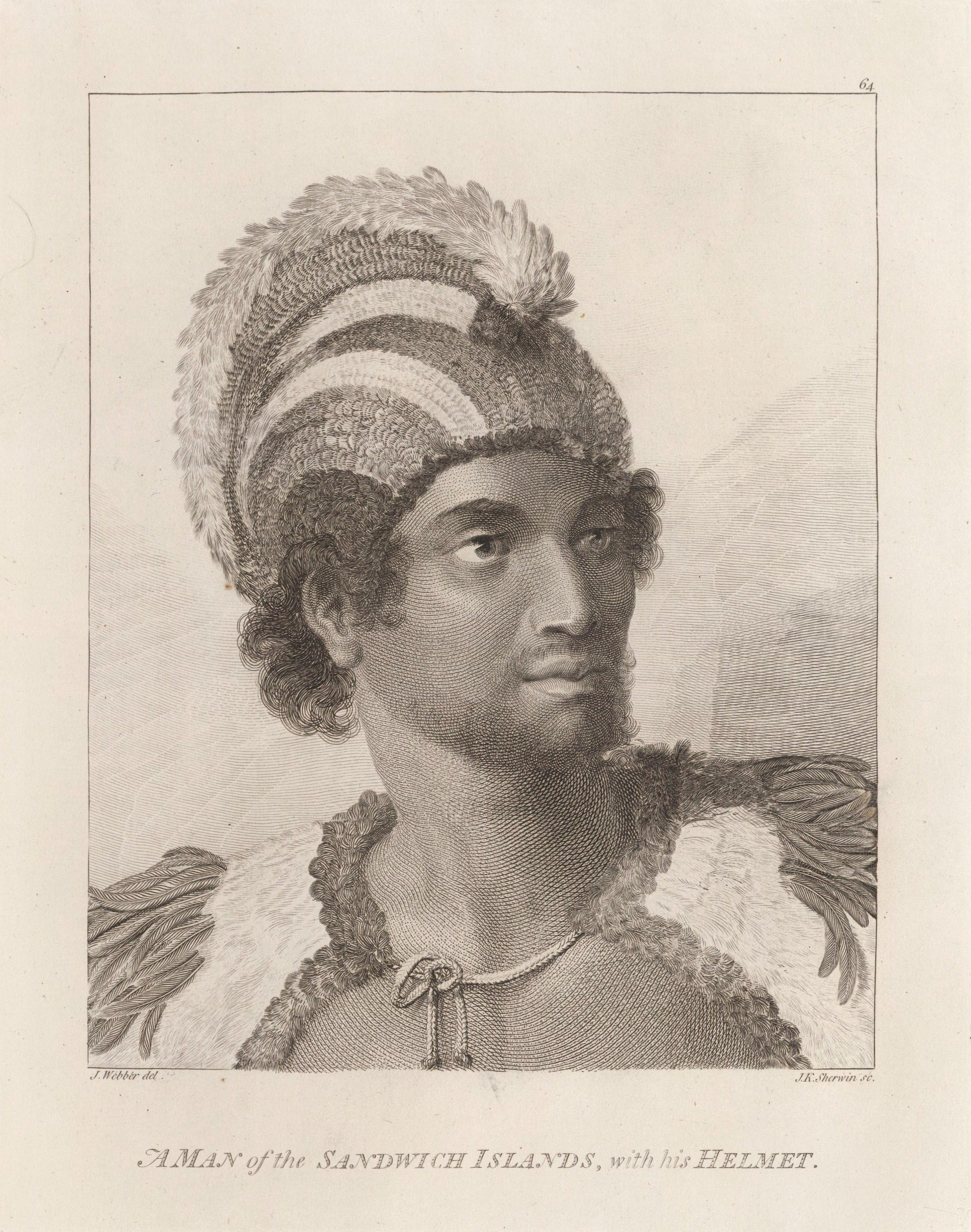
High Chief, Kalaimanokahoʻowaha, also known as Kanaʻina nui ("The conquering")

Kalaimanokahoʻowaha (also known as Kanaʻina) was an aliʻi high chief of the island of Hawaii who lived during the period of Captain James Cook's visit to the islands. He was the chief said to have struck the first blow to Cook when he attempted to kidnap Kalaniʻōpuʻu, the king of the island. He was called Kanaʻina nui (an aliʻi title) as a birthright from his father, Keaweʻopala, first born son of Alapainui. After his father was killed by Kalaniʻōpuʻu, he would serve the new king as a kaukau aliʻi, a service class of Hawaiian nobility that his mother, Moana Wahine had descended from. This aliʻi service line would continue throughout the Kingdom of Hawaii.

== Birth and family ==
Kalaimanokahoʻowaha was the son of the aliʻi nui of the island of Hawaiʻi, Keaweʻopala and Moana Wahine. He was given the nickname ka naʻina which, in the Hawaiian language means: "The conquering". His paternal grandfather was Alapainui and his maternal grandmother was ʻIlikiāmoana. His father was overthrown and killed by Kalaniʻōpuʻu. He would serve under the new kings as kaukau aliʻi. He married his half sister Hakau. Their shared mother was Moana and her father Heulu. Together the couple would have at least two children, Hao (K) and Kiʻilaweau (k). Hao's line leads to Bernice Pauahi Bishop and Kiʻilaweau to Keelikōlani.

== Greeting Cook ==
Upon Cook's first arrival to Hawaii, Kanaina was one of two chiefs to first greet the navigator. One of the ship's crew writes:

"Among all of the excitement and confusion two chiefs, an exceptionally handsome six footer named Kanaina and a friendly young man named Palea made themselves useful by ordering canoes out of the path of the ships and stoning the more importunate commoners from the decks".

Kanaina had been of help to the European explorers from very early on, even after a scuffle between the crew of Resolution and an islander when the chief had urged him to suggest an obviously over-inflated price for his pig. Many of the other chiefs were less respectful of the newcomers and stole from them. An islander had grabbed a chisel and tongs and jumped overboard. Cook and James King searched a beach under harassment from the townspeople of the Island. Cooks had to make threats of firing his weapon in the air with little success in intimidating the crowds.

== Kidnapping of Kalaniʻōpuʻu ==
The decision to kidnap and ransom the ruling chief of the Island of Hawaii was a fatal error on the part of the British navigator and the main cause of his death. His arrival to Hawaii would eventually be followed by mass migrations of Europeans and Americas to the islands that would eventually end with the overthrow of the Kingdom of Hawaii by pro-American elements.

=== Ships arrive during different seasons ===
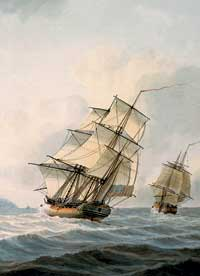
HMS Resolution and HMS Discovery

James Cook led three separate voyages to chart unknown areas of the globe for the Kingdom of Great Britain. It was on his third and finale voyage that he encountered what we know today as the Islands of Hawaii. He arrived in the islands on January 18, 1778. After Cook's initial visit he left but was forced to return to Hawaii in mid February 1779 after a ship's mast broke in bad weather. When Cook had first arrived in the islands he was greeted with great honor. His arrival coincided with the Makahiki, a festival celebrating the yearly harvest while worshipping the Hawaiian deity, Lono. On February 13, while anchored in Kealakekua Bay a small boat was stolen by one of the lesser chiefs, testing the foreigner's reaction to see how far they could go. After he and the crews of both ships, HMS Resolution and HMS Discovery left the islands, the festival season had ended and the season for battle and war had begun under the worship and rituals for Kūkaʻilimoku, the god of war. The Hawaiians refused to return the stolen boat. To try and force them to do so, Cook attempted to kidnap the aliʻi nui of the island of Hawaii, Kalaniʻōpuʻu. Cook made several mistakes on his third journey being quite sick and ill-tempered. The hostage attempt would prove fatal. The idea or suggestion that the Native Hawaiians considered Cook to be the God Lono himself is considered to be attributed to William Bligh and disputed by modern scholars. Hawaiian mythology author William Drake Westervelt, after referencing all known published accounts, wrote "The historian must remember that there were thousands of native eye-witnesses whose records cannot be overlooked in securing a true history. The following account is almost entirely from the Hawaiians only...He was called by the Hawaiians "O Lono," because they thought he was the god Lono, one of the chief gods of the ancient Hawaiians." and "When the chiefs heard this report they said, 'Truly this is the god Lono with his temple,'" as well as several similar quotes from natives. It is possible that some Hawaiians may have used the name of Lono as a metaphor when describing Cook or other possible explanations other than that the Hawaiians mistook the explorer for their own deity.

=== Attempt to take the aliʻi nui hostage ===
The following morning of February 14, 1779, Cook and his men launched from Resolution along with a company of armed marines. They went directly to the ruling chief's enclosure where Kalaniʻōpuʻu was still sleeping. They woke him and directed him to come with them away from the town. As Cook and his men marched the ruler out of the royal enclosure, Cook himself held the hands of elder chief as they walked away from the town towards the beach. Kalaniʻōpuʻu's favorite wife, Kānekapōlei, saw them as they were leaving and yelled after her husband but he did not stop. She called to the other chiefs and the townspeople to direct their attention toward the ruling chief being led away. Two chiefs, including Kanaʻina and the king's personal attendant named Nuaa, followed the group to the beach with the king's wife behind them pleading along the way for the aliʻi nui to stop and come back.

By the time they got to the beach, Kalaniʻōpuʻu's two youngest sons, who had been following their father believing they were being invited to visit the ship again with the ruler, began to climb into the boats that were waiting at the shore. Kānekapōlei shouted to them to get out of the boat and pleaded with her husband to stop. The ruler then realized that Cook and his men were not inviting him to visit the ship, but forcing him. At this point he stopped and sat where he stood.

=== Death of Cook ===
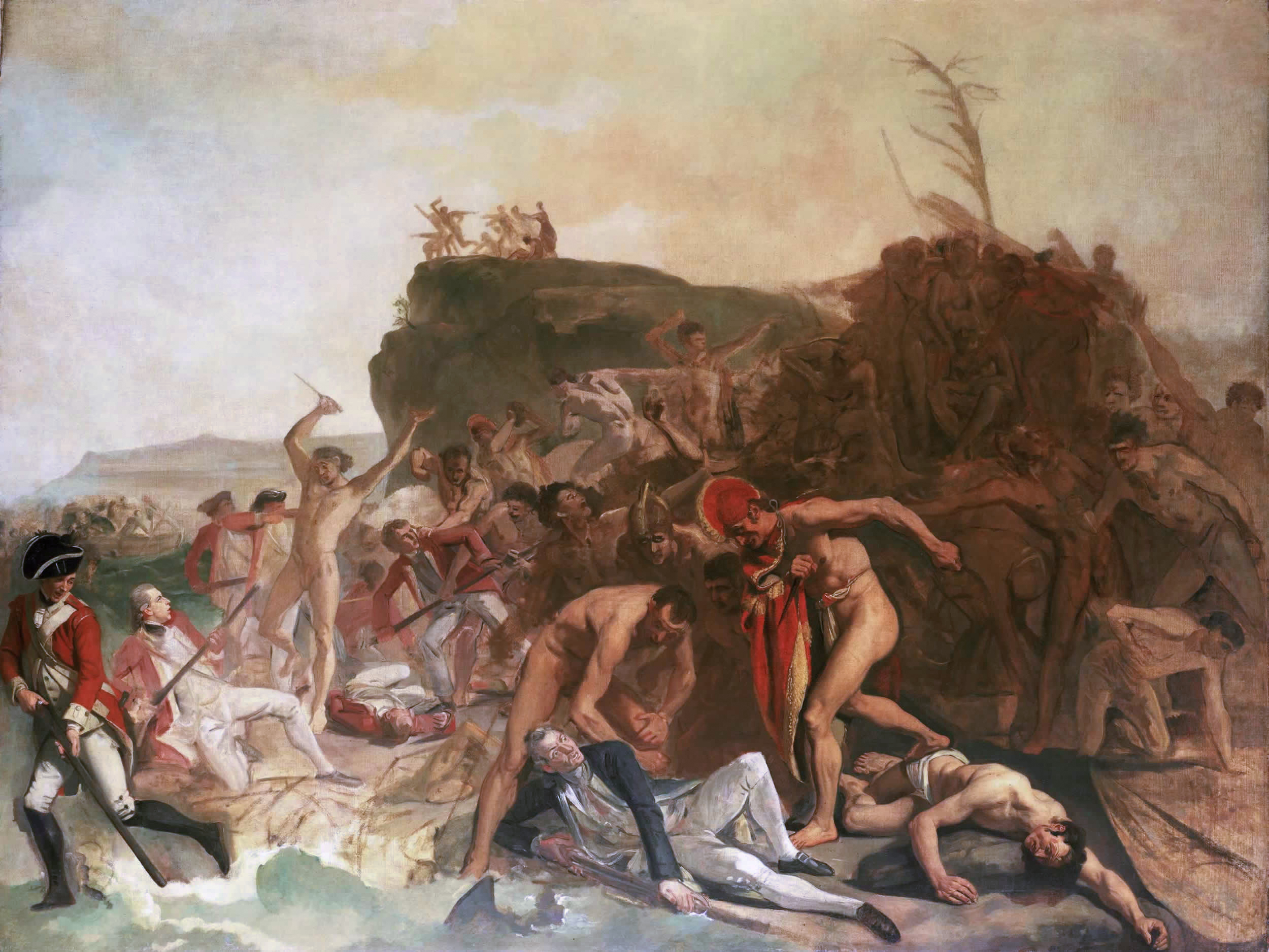
Painting, "Death of Captain Cook" by Johann Zoffany

Cook's men were confronted on the beach by an elderly kahuna who approached them holding a coconut and chanting. They yelled at the priest to go away but he kept approaching them while singing the mele. When Cook and his men looked away from the old kahuna, the beach was now swarmed by thousands of Native Hawaiians. Cook yelled at Kalaniʻōpuʻu to get up but the ruler refused. As the townspeople began to gather around them, Cook and his men began to back away from the crowd and raise their guns. The two chiefs and Kānekapōlei shielded the aliʻi nui as Cook tried to get him to his feet. The crowd was now very hostile. Kanaʻina approached Cook, who reacted by striking the chief with the broad side of his sword. Kanaʻina instantly grabbed Cook and lifted the man. Some accounts state that Kanaʻina did not intend to hit Cook while other descriptions say the chief struck the navigator across the head with his leiomano. Either way, Kanaʻina released Cook where he fell to the ground. As Cook tried to get up, the attendant Nuaa stabbed Captain Cook with a metal dagger.

The Marines fired as they fled, killing a number of the angered crowds people, including Kanaʻina and his brothers. They got into the boats and fled back to the ship where, with a spyglass, a young William Bligh (the future captain of HMS Bounty) watched as Cook's body was dragged up the hill to the town where it was torn into pieces in full view of his ship's crew.
