= Charles Kanaʻina =

Hawaiian judge and noble (1798–1877)

Kanaʻina II
- His Honour/His Highness
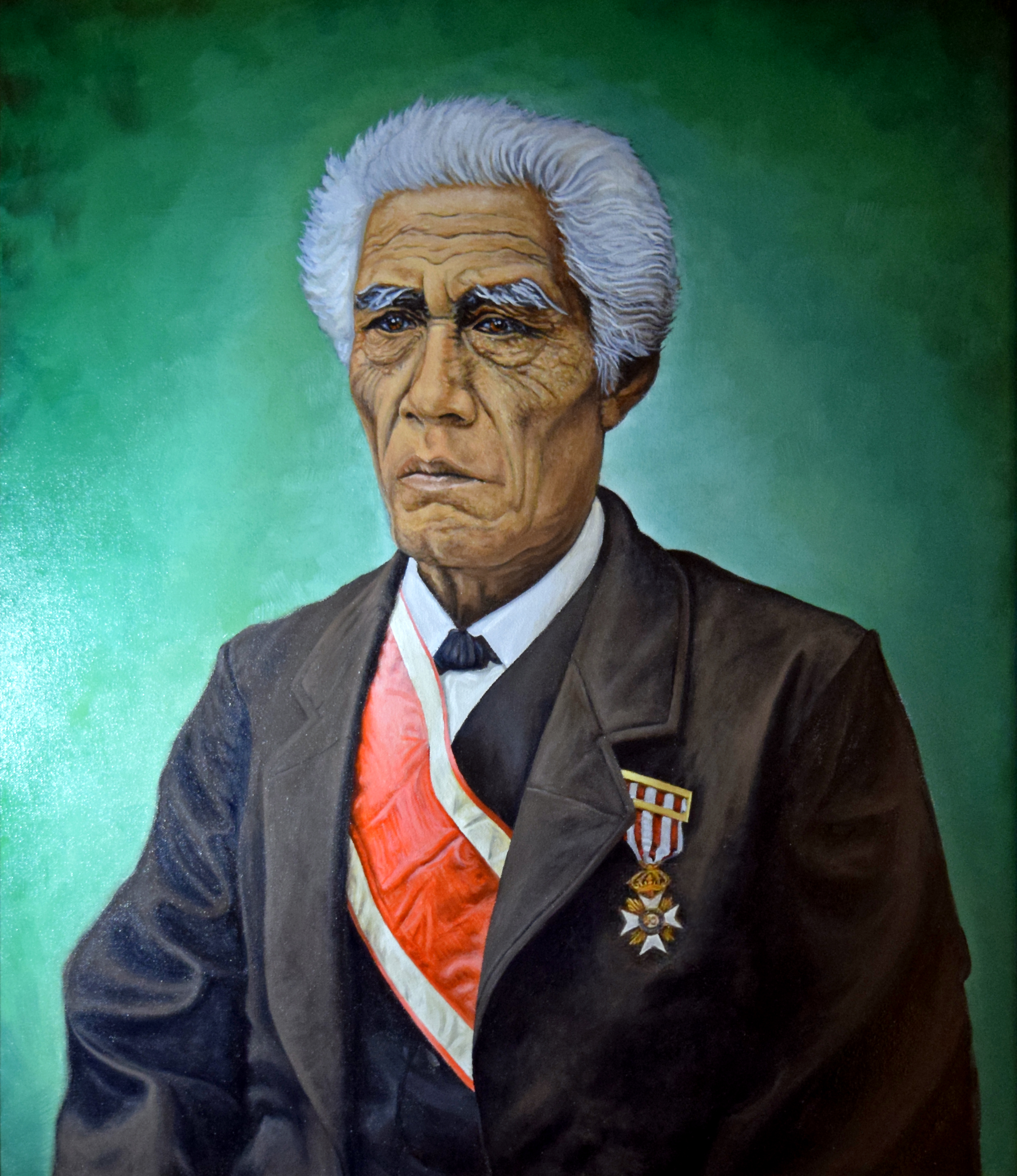
- Charles Kanaʻina, from a 2016 painting
- Born: c. May 4, 1798; Napoʻopoʻo, Hawaiʻi
- Died: March 13, 1877 (aged 78); Honolulu, Oahu
- Burial: March 29, 1877; Kawaiahaʻo Church
- Spouse: Miriam Auhea Kekāuluohi
- Issue: Davida; William Charles Lunalilo
- House: House of Moana; House of Kamehameha
- Father: Eia Kalaiku'ahulu
- Mother: Kauwā Palila
- Occupation: House of Nobles; Privy Counsel; Royal attendant Kāhili Bearer

Charles Kanaʻina (Kanaʻina II; c. May 4, 1798 – March 13, 1877) was an aliʻi (hereditary noble) of the Kingdom of Hawaii, prince consort of Kuhina Nui, Kaʻahumanu III and father of William Charles Lunalilo, the 6th monarch of the Kamehameha Dynasty. Kanaʻina was a descendant of several figures from ancient Hawaiian history, including Liloa, Hakau and Umi-a-Liloa of Hawaiʻi Island as well as Piilani of Maui. He served on both the Privy Counsel and in the House of Nobles. He was named after his uncle Kanaʻina, a name that means "The conquering" in the Hawaiian Language. This uncle greeted Captain James Cook in 1778 and confronted the navigator before he was killed.

His wife Miriam Auhea Kekāuluohi was a widow and niece of Kamehameha I. She was also married to Kamehameha II before he converted to Christianity and gave up all but one wife. Kanaʻina and Kekāuluohi lived in a traditional aliʻi style home in a sacred neighborhood in Honolulu called Pohukaina near Kekūanaōʻa, Kaʻahumanu and their offspring. The compound would eventually become the Iolani Palace (the official Royal Residence of the Hawaiian Royal Family) and Palace Walk when Kekūanaōʻa built Hale Aliʻi in the center of the families estates as a gift to his daughter Victoria Kamāmalu. Kanaʻina kept his property at the palace until his death and would be the only original owner to do so while the Palace was in use, living there through five monarchs, from the 1820s to 1877. Kanaʻina's son, William Charles Lunalilo, was named by Kamehameha III as an heir to the throne of the kingdom and ascended in 1873 while his father still lived. Lunalilo died only a year later, three years before his father's death on March 13, 1877. Having not re-written his will, which left everything to his son who had predeceased, Kanaʻina died intestate. Probate hearings proceeded for 5 years. On final adjudication his property was auctioned with the proceeds going to several of Kanaʻina's cousins including Ruth Keelikōlani and Bernice Pauahi Bishop.

== Birth, early life and marriage ==
Charles Kanaʻina Eia was born about May 4, 1798 (Note: Church records indicate a birth month and day: (Mormon Church Genealogical Library, Honolulu): CHAS. KANAINA EIA born 4 May 1798; (married Kekauluohi about 1822[sic]).) to his mother Kauwā and father Eia, at Napoʻopoʻo, Hawaiʻi, although the year has been dated as late as 1812. (Note: Many sources have different dates. Author Barrère has compiled all other known birth dates as follows; Charles Kanaina was born ca. 1802 in Napoopoo, Kona. Born ca. 1801: Friend, April 1877, says he died aged 76 Born 1802 or 1804: "I am about 58 years old, it may be 60" (Kanaina's testimony 7 Feb. 1862 in Equity 200) Born ca. 1802: KiA Paulo Kanoa's testimony in Probate 1562 (Kalama, 1870): "I was 10 years old when 1 first knew Kanaina [Kanoa was born ca. 1802-4]. He was born in Napoopoo, Hawaii; it was the time when Kamehameha went to Hawaii" [1812, when Kanoa was ca. 10]. Kapahu, w. and Kahele, w. were his kahu "in the latter years of his life." "Kapahu and Auwae, long time servants to Chas. Kanaina " Auwae named a son Kanaina, but he is "not related to him." (Mis. Pam. Vol. II, BishopMusDU 620M 67).)

There was speculation Kanaʻina was not a High Chief by birth, however recent research has identified his father to be Eia Kalaikuʻahulu, (Note: The genealogy of Henry Howard Kauauanuiamahi De Fries, given on August 22, 1901, and printed by The Honolulu Advertiser.) making him a descendant of the first aliʻi nui Liloa through both sons, Umi-a-Liloa and Hakau. Abraham Fornander states in his 1916-17 publication; "Fornander Collection of Hawaiian Antiquities and Folk-lore" that C. Kanaina was descended from Kanealai, aliʻi nui wahine (female ruler) of Molokai, through a grandmother named Kaha. Fornander records that Kanealai was one of the recognized wives of Keaweʻīkekahialiʻiokamoku with whom she had four children, including Kumukoa (k) who became the father of Kalaikuʻahulu who is connected to Molokai.

In the 2000 publication; "Kamehameha's Children Today", authors Charles Ahlo, Rubellite Kawena Kinney Johnson and Jerry Walker state that Kanaʻina's maternal grandfather, Palila Nohomualani was Kamehameha I's grandson through the monarch's first born child named Kahiliopua, a daughter of Kalola-a-Kumukoa. This genealogy is based on previously unpublished family trees compiled by the DeFries family. Eia and Kauwā's other four children were named Naʻea, Iʻahuʻula, Kahele and Kaikumoku.

He was named Kanaʻina, after the nickname of his uncle Kalaimanokahoʻowaha, the Native Hawaiian drawn by artist John Webber, who greeted Captain James Cook and was present at the navigator's death at Kealakekua Bay. In the Hawaiian language, ka naʻina means "the conquering". Kanaʻina was part of the kaukau aliʻi class, which was one of five levels of kānaka maoli (ʻōiwi) (Native Hawaiian) aliʻi (hereditary noble) status that served the ruling class as close relatives.

=== Marriage ===
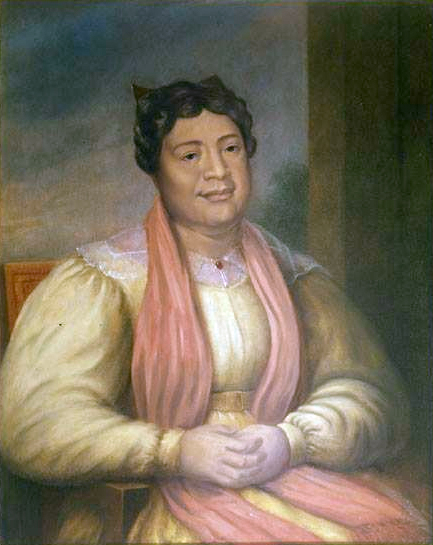
Kanaʻina's wife, Miriam Auhea Kekāuluohi, co-ruled as Kuhina Nui, styled as Kaʻahumanu III from April 5, 1839, to June 7, 1845

In 1810 the monarch of the independent Island of Kauaʻi, Kaumualii (c. 1778 – May 26, 1824), negotiated a peaceful agreement that allowed Kauaʻi to become a part of Kamehameha I's new Hawaiian Kingdom, while still allowing Kaumualii to remain the islands ruler until his death. The agreement established Kamehameha's son Liholiho as supreme monarch after Kaumauii's death. After Kamehameha I's death, a council was held in July 1821 with Kaumualii and Liholiho, now styled as "Kamehameha II" along with the top chiefs and advisors, including Charles Kanaʻina. Kamehameha II decided to continue his father's arrangements. For this, Kaumualii asked the new monarch to take some Kauaʻi lands for his wives, to appease Liholiho's guardians. While Kamehameha II refused to do so—stating that his father had left no instructions about the land, only that he should be the supreme monarch—he did take Kaumualii's wife Kekaihaʻakūlou as one of his own wives and gave his wife Kekāuluohi to his most trusted advisor, Kanaʻina, as a way to please the chiefs. It is believed the council decision displeased the new Kuhina Nui, Kaʻahumanu. A year later, she would take Kaumualii and later his son Kealiiahonui as her husbands, using the teachings of the missionaries on marriage, to make herself their heirs. Kanaʻina married Miriam Auhea Kekāuluohi that same year on Kauaʻi. Kekāuluohi had been one of several wives of both Kamehameha I and Kamehameha II. She became co-ruler of the Hawaiian Kingdom with Kamehameha III in 1839 as Kuhina Nui (co-regent), styled as Kaahumanu III.

=== Residence ===
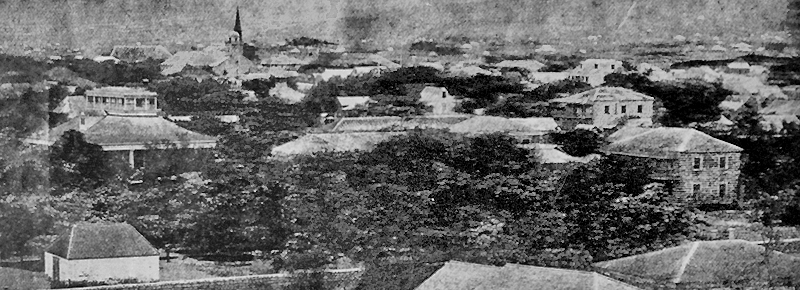
The Pohukaina property of Kekāuluohi and Charles Kanaʻina included the Royal Tomb (bottom left) as well as the two story brick house (to the right) where Lunalilo was born

Kanaʻina and Kekāuluohi lived near Kekūanaōʻa, who had his home just west of theirs called Haliimaile. The homes were in the area called Pohukaina. This area was a sacred burial site for aliʻi. Their home was similar to that of the other estates in the neighborhood consisting of small buildings used for different purposes. The sitting and sleeping area had a folding door entrance of green painted wood under glass upper panels. The house had two rooms separated by a festooned tent door of chintz fabric and was carpeted with hand crafted makaloa mats. In the front was a lounge area opposite a sideboard and mirror. In the middle they placed a semi circle of armchairs with a center table where the couple would write. Four matching cabinet-bookshelves with glass doors were set in each corner of the room with silk scarves hanging from each. In his book, A visit to the South Seas, in the U.S. Ship Vincennes: during the years 1829 and 1830, Charles Samuel Stewart states:

"They both write with great readiness; and the husband with a freedom and command of hand that would class him among good penman anywhere. Both are among the most studious and improving of their compeers".

Next to their home was an old estate that had been demolished called Hanailoia. This was the spot of an ancient heiau called Kaahaimauli. In July 1844 Kekūanaōʻa began building a large home here as a gift to his daughter Victoria Kamāmalu. Instead, Kamehameha III would buy the estate and use as his Royal Residence after moving the capitol of the kingdom to Honolulu. It would become the Iolani Palace. As older aliʻi died, the lands were passed down and concentrated into fewer hands. Kekāuluohi's lands were passed down to her from the Kamehameha family. When she died, she left her accumulated lands and wealth to her son, not her husband Kanaʻina however, Lunalilo predeceased his father. Kanaʻina served as a member of the House of Nobles of Kamehameha III from 1841 to 1876, on the Privy Council from July 29, 1845, to 1855, and on the Supreme Court from when it was first founded on May 10, 1842. In the tradition of European royalty, he was granted the style (manner of address) of "His Highness".

=== Children ===
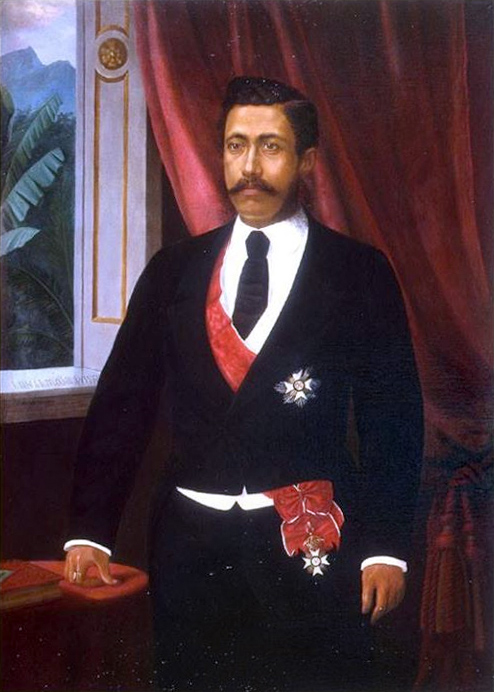
Kanaʻina's son, William Charles Lunalilo ruled as king from January 8, 1873, to February 3, 1874

Kanaʻina and Kekāuluohi had two sons. Their first son Davida, died young. Their surviving natural son, William Charles Lunalilo was born on January 31, 1835, at Pohukaina. He was considered the grandnephew of Kamehameha I, and second cousin to King Kamehameha V, King Kamehameha IV, and Princess Victoria Kamāmalu, through his mother, Kekāuluohi, who was the cousin of Elizabeth Kīnaʻu (later called Kaʻahumanu II). Lunalilo was declared eligible to succeed by the royal decree of King Kamehameha III and sent to the Chief's Children's School (later called the Royal School) when it was founded by missionaries Amos Starr Cooke and Juliette Montague Cooke. They had several hānai (informal adoption) children including Kalama, the daughter of Iʻahuʻula (Kanaʻina's sister) and Naihekukui. Kalama became the queen consort and wife of Kamehameha III. Kanaʻina and Kekāuluohi also hānai adopted Kalama and Kamehameha III's second son Keaweaweulaokalani II.

==== Lunalilo Trust ====
Kanaʻina acted as trustee of the royal lands that had been inherited by his wife while his son was a minor, and after his son's death. When Kanaʻina died, the court appointed nine trustees, six of which would take part in the militia that overthrew the monarchy and also take part in the new provisional government. Dole himself had been on the record as supporting the break up of crown lands to promote American style farming in his newspaper in 1872. Various lawsuits ensued over the property including a suit questioning the validity of the will due to Lunalilo being under the guardianship of his father when he made it out. Lunalilo had requested in his will to use the estate to fund a charity. The trustees favored splitting up the estate by selling it off, while others claimed the value of land was underestimated, and an endowment to run the charity could have been funded by lease income. For example, Kanaʻina leased (and later his heirs would sell) thousands of acres of land on the island of Hawaii to businessman (and son of missionaries) William Herbert Shipman.

== Death and legacy ==
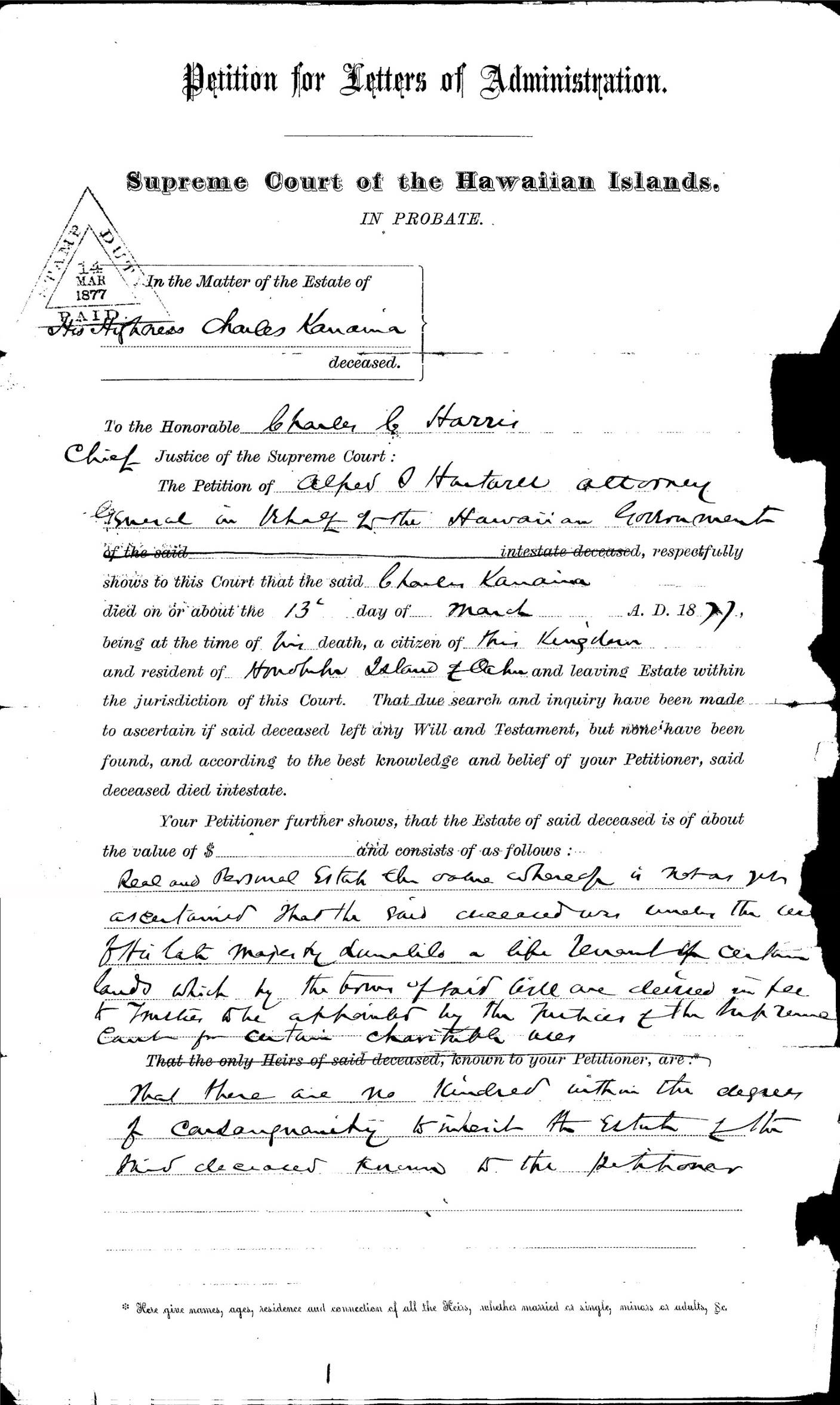
The first petition for administration of the Kanaʻina estate filed on March 14, 1877. The day after Kanaʻina's death

Kanaʻina died on March 13, 1877, in Honolulu, Oahu, and was buried at Kawaiahaʻo Church in the Lunalilo Mausoleum, next to his son who had died before him. While Kanaʻina had made out a will, he had left everything to his son, and so had died intestate. Petitions to administer the estate began the following day. Probate proceedings were litigated for four years, between 1877 and 1881, and re-affirmed in 1886.

Attorney General Alfred S. Hartwell applied for the appointment of trustees shortly after Kanaʻina's death under the articles of Lunalilo's will. Article three of that will bequeathed the entirety of his estate to three trustees appointed by the Justices of the Supreme Court of the Hawaiian Kingdom. The property was to be sold and invested until the sum of $25,000.00 was raised to fund a home for the poor and destitute. Chief Justice Charles Coffin Harris ordered a hearing for April 5, 1877, to hear the petition pertaining to the estate of the late Charles Kanaʻina and anyone who could show reason not to grant it.

=== Estate probate ===
A petition was filed by King David Kalakaua, his sisters and brother-in-law, Lydia K. Dominis, Miriam K. Cleghorn and Archibald Scott Cleghorn, with a hearing set by Justice Lawrence McCully. In July 1878, Justices Harris, Judd and McCully heard Kalakaua's appeal. While the Justices felt that the claim of Kalakaua and his sisters had not been proven, they were impressed with that of Kilinahe (Kanaʻina's first cousin) and other claimants based on testimony and witnesses. The court decreed that the estate be split into four equal shares: one quarter to go to Haalilio (k), Haalelea (k) and Kahukaiola (k); one quarter each to Pahua (w) and Kaahua (k); and one quarter to the widow and children of Kilinahe, who had died before the adjudication of his claim.

Claimants from the line of Moana Wahine made petitions to the court under the act of 1874 to quite land titles. The act was later deemed unconstitutional and a new decree of heirship was made. By December 1879 disbursement of land in trust with William Cooper Parke, (Marshal of Hawaii from 1853 to 1884) and owned by heirs, could not be agreed upon for settlement. Most supported the sale of the lands, so an order was made and all land sold at auction.

=== Heirs and legacy ===
Final adjudication of probate found a total of eight parties or groups of relatives, most of whom were descended from Moana and her four husbands, as heirs to the Kanaʻina estate splitting a total of 9 shares, with 2 shares going to one party. The probate records include a great deal of information from the four years of litigation. A great number of people petitioned the courts to claim title as heirs after the initial 1878 judgement. In the final adjudication, Bernice Pauahi Bishop received two of the nine shares. The remaining seven of the nine shares were divided equally in 1/9th and distributed to Ruth Keelikōlani, Haalilio and Haalelea (namesakes of the historic figures), Kilinahe (Whose grandmother was the older sister of Kanaʻina's mother and 5 other parties. The first three trustees included John Mott-Smith and Sanford B. Dole.

The Hawaii public archives building, built in 1906 on the ʻIolani Palace grounds, in a section that was formerly the Kanaʻina's estate, was dedicated as the Kanaʻina building. It originally held the public archives but today hold the administrative offices of Friends of ʻIolani Palace.

== Honours ==
- K.G.C. Knight of the Grand Cross of the Royal Order of Kamehameha I May 28, 1874 (Note: Government Proclamation, 1874. On the 28th of May last, it pleased His Majesty to confer the distinction of Knight Grand Cross of the Royal Order of Kamehameha I. upon the following gentlemen: H. H. Charles Kanaina, Hon. Charles R. Bishop, Hon. John O. Dominis, Hon. Archibald S. Cleghorn.)
- K.G.C. Knight of the Grand Cross of the Royal Order of Kalakaua

=== Arms ===

Precursor of Hawaii's Coat of Arms

Coat of arms after 1850

== Family tree ==
Charles Kanaina family tree

Liloa (k)	Pinea (w)	Akahiakuleana (w)
Hakau (k)	Kukulaniapea (w)	Umi-a-Liloa (k)	Kapulani-o-Liloa (w)
Pineaikalani (k)	Keauomeha (w)
Hakaukalalapuakea (w)	Keawenuiaumi (k)	Kawaihalaniwailuau (w)
Keliiolono (k)	Ilikikualiine (w)
Opua (k)	Hinakaubiohope (w)	Kanaloakuaana (k)	Kaikilanialiiwahineopuna
Ilikieleele (w)	Makakuokalani (k)
Mahi (k)	Umiiwiula (w)	Keākealanikāne; Aliʻi Nui o Hawaiʻi
Kauauanuiamahi (k)	Kepookapuokalani (w)	Kauhiakama; Aliʻi Nui o Maui	Kapukini
Kaleiheana (w); Half sister of Alapainui	Kalanikaumakaowakea (k); Aliʻi Nui o Maui	Kekaikuihala I
Moana (k)	Piilaniwahine II
Kauhiapiiao (k)	Iliki A Moana (w)
Moana (w)	Palila Nohomualani (k)	Keaweopala (k); Aliʻi Nui o Hawaiʻi	Heulu (k)
Makakaualii	Kapulaoa
Kaikailua	Keakaokalani	Kalaipuwaa	Kaleimanokahoʻowaha	Eia	Kauwa	Kanaʻina I	Hakau
Kanemano II	Kepaalani	Paihewa	Maunakapu	Kanaʻina II; Charles Kanaʻina	Kaʻahumanu III	Kiʻilaweau	Kaleimanokahoʻowaha	Hao	Kailipakalua
Pahau; Legal heir of Kanaʻina	Kilinahe; Legal heir of Kanaʻina	William Charles Lunalilo	Kekūanaōʻa	Kalanipauahi	Kaʻōleiokū	Kahailiopua Luahine
Keʻelikōlani; Legal heir of Kanaʻina	Kōnia	Pākī
Bernice Pauahi Bishop; Legal heir of Kanaʻina

== Notes ==
Noted from above: Charles Kana'ina had a 1/2 sister named Kapau, and a full sister named Kahele. This would make sense that these woman were his kahu in his later years.
