= House of Moana =

Princely line of the Islands of Hawaii

The House of Moana is a princely line of the Islands of Hawaii. The line begins with Moana kāne (sometimes Moanakāne), the son of Keākealani Kāne, aliʻi nui of the island of Hawaiʻi, and is also the name of the ruler's granddaughter. Moana kāne and Moana Wahine's descendants include many, if not most, of the monarchs from the House of Kamehameha. In the Hawaiian language moana means 'ocean'. The word combines moe and ana ('a lying down') and can also mean the act of prostrating oneself by leaning forward on one's hands and knees in the presence of a chief, or the act of worship. Ku-hai-moana is the most famous of the Hawaiian shark gods.

== Origins of the House of Moana ==
Moana (k) is directly descended from the notable aliʻi ʻaimoku (noble ruling a district or districts) named Liloa through both of the high chief's two sons. Kaleiheana is descended from Liloa's first born son Hakau and from Liloa's grandson Keawenuiaumi is descended Keākealani Kāne. Kaleiheana is a step sister of Alapainui. The couple's son would be referred to similarly as his father with the addition of the word or title kāne, meaning: male or husband and is also the name of the leading Hawaiian god. Moana Kāne married Piʻilaniwahine and from their union the chiefly lines of Piʻilani and the full Liloa/Umi/Hakau lines are merged. The couple had three children, ʻIlikiāmoana, Lonoamoana and Kapuniamoana.

ʻIlikiāmoana (w) would marry Kauhiapiiao (k) and from their union would come the high priestess Moanawahine. She would become the most sought after woman of her time to father the children of future kings from numerous high chiefs. Much of the Hawaiian Royal Family are directly related to this line, including many of the monarchs of the Kingdom of Hawaii from the House of Kamehameha. Moana (k) represents the beginning of a new kaukau aliʻi service line of Hawaiian nobility up to Kanaʻina. As a secondary aliʻi family line, members would often marry into the ruling family. She is the great grandmother of Lunalilo and great, great grandmother of Kamehameha IV, Kamehameha V, Keʻelikōlani and a more distant great, great, great grandmother of Bernice Pauahi Bishop. The genealogy books of Queen Kalama, Book C on page 2, lists Moana (w) as cohabitating with Keaweʻopala as entered in her own handwriting. ʻIlikiāmoana and Kauhiapiiao would also have other children named: Kahanaumalani, Heiaholani, and Ko'iali'ipuhe'elani.

- Moana Kāne
- ʻIlikiāmoana
- Lonoamoana
- Kapuniamoana
- Moana Wahine

== Family tree of Kamehameha and Moana ==
Moana Family Tree

Piilani I Mo'i, Ruling Chief of Maui	Kumunuiakapokii
Liloa; Ruling Chief of Hawai'i Island	Pinea	Akahiakuleana (w)	Kealana-a-waʻauli (w)	Lono-a-Piilani (k); Mo'i, Ruling Chief of Maui	Nihokela (k)	Kapumakokoula (w)
Hakau	Kukulaniapea	Umi-a-Liloa I Ruling Chief of Hawai'i Island	Kapulani-o-Liloa (w)	Kaakaupea	Keliiokaloa I Mo'i, Ruling Chief of Maui	Hikaalani
Keawenui-a-Umi; Mo'i, Ruler of Hawaii by Conquest	Kawaihalaniwailuau (w)	Kamalalawalu; Moi ruler of Maui	Piilaniwahine I	Hoikahu (k)	Kaumaka (w)
Kanaloakuaana (k)	Kaikilanialiiwahineopuna I Ruling Queen of Hawaii	Kauhiakama I Mo'i, Ruler of Maui	Kapukini III	Umikaumaka	Liloakaai
Keakealanikane; Mo'i, King of Hawai'i (k)	Kealiiokalani (w)	Kaleiheana (w) (Note: >http://kanakagenealogy.files.wordpress.com/2010/04/haalelea-liwai-levi-lca-5382.pdf)	Kalanikaumakaowakea I Moi, Ruler of Maui	Kekaikuihala I	Makakuwahine	Keliiokaloa II	Liloa'ilima'ohulani
Keakamahana	Iwikau-i-kaua	Moana-kane (k)	Piilaniwahine II 'I Chiefess of Hilo	Umi-a-Liloa II	Ku'ihewa-maka-walu	Haki (k)	Piiao (w)
Kanalohanauikawela	Keakealaniwahine	Iliki A Moana (w)	Kauhiapiiao (k)	Ulu'ehu	Kalaniomaiheuila
Keaweikekahialiiokamoku	Kalanikauleleiaiwi	Kauaua-a-Mahi (k)	Moana Wahine (w); High Priestess	Nohomualani Palila (k)	Keaweopala (k)	Heulu (k)
Keeaumoku I	Kamakaimoku	Haae-a-Mahi	Kekelakekeokalani	Kanaina	Hakau
Kahekili II	Keōua	Kekuiapoiwa II	Kalaipuwaa	Kaleimanokahoowaha	Kauwa (w)	Eia
Kamehameha I	Paihewa	Maunakapu	Charles Kanaina	Kekāuluohi
Kilinahe	Wahineole	Luika	Lama	Lunalilo
