= Aliʻi =

Hereditary nobles of ancient Hawai'i

The aliʻi (/ə.ˈli.i/, ə-LEE-ee; Hawaiian: [a.li.ʔi]) were the traditional nobility of the Hawaiian islands. They were part of a hereditary line of rulers, the noho aliʻi. There were many classes of aliʻi (or chief) and the position could be held by a man or a woman.

Cognates of the word aliʻi have a similar meaning in other Polynesian languages; in Māori it is ariki and in Tahitian ari'i.

== Background ==
In ancient Hawaiian society, the aliʻi were hereditary nobles (a social class or caste). The aliʻi consisted of the higher and lesser chiefs of the various levels on the islands. The noho aliʻi were the ruling chiefs. The aliʻi were believed to be descended from the deities.

There were eleven classes of aliʻi, of both men and women. These included the kahuna (priestesses and priests, experts, craftsmen, and canoe makers) as part of four professions practiced by the nobility. Each island had its own aliʻi nui, who governed their individual systems. Aliʻi continued to play a role in the governance of the Hawaiian islands until 1893, when Queen Liliʻuokalani was overthrown by a coup d'état backed by the United States government.

In Hawaiian, nui means 'grand', 'great', or 'supreme', so aliʻi nui were ruling chiefs. The nui title could be passed on by right of birth.

== Social designations of noho aliʻi (ruling line) ==
Historians David Malo, Samuel M. Kamakau and Abraham Fornander wrote extensively about the different aliʻi lines and their importance to Hawaiian history. The distinctions between the aliʻi ranks and lines comes from their writings.

- Aliʻi nui were supreme high chiefs of an island and no others were above them (during the Kingdom period this title would come to mean 'governor'). The four largest Hawaiian islands (Hawaiʻi proper, Maui, Kauaʻi, and Oʻahu) were usually ruled each by their own aliʻi nui. Molokaʻi also had a line of island rulers, but was later subjected to the superior power of nearby Maui and Oʻahu during the seventeenth and eighteenth centuries. Mōʻī was a special title for the highest chief of the island of Maui. Later, the title was used for all rulers of the Hawaiian Islands and the Hawaiian monarchs.
- Aliʻi nui kapu were sacred rulers with special taboos.
- Aliʻi Nīʻaupiʻo were a rank of chiefs who were considered the very highest in descent and power. Nīʻaupiʻo chiefs can be from Piʻo or Naha unions.
- Aliʻi Piʻo were a rank of chiefs who were products of full blood sibling unions. Famous Piʻo chiefs were the royal twins, Kameʻeiamoku and Kamanawa.
- Aliʻi Naha were a rank of chiefs who were products of either half-blood sibling unions or the unions of uncle and niece or father and daughter. The exact definition is disputed amongst Malo, Kamakau and Fornander. Chiefs of this rank traditionally possessed the kapu noho ('sitting kapu'). Famous Naha chiefs include Keōpūolani.
- Aliʻi Wohi were a rank of chiefs who were products of marriage of close relatives other than siblings; one famous Wohi chief was Kamehameha I. These chiefs possessed the kapu wohi, exempting them from kapu moe ('prostration taboo').
- Papa were chiefs born to mother of the nīʻaupiʻo, piʻo, or naha rank with a lower-ranking male chief.
- Lōkea were chiefs born to high-ranked father with a mother who was a relative through younger siblings.
- Lāʻau aliʻi' were chiefs born to parents who are children of high chiefs through secondary unions.
- Kaukaualiʻi were lesser chiefs who served the aliʻi nui. It is a relative term and not a fixed level of aliʻi nobility. The expression is elastic in terms of how it is used. In general, it means a relative who is born from a lesser ranking parent. A kaukaualiʻi son's own children, if born of a lesser ranking aliʻi mother, would descend to a lower rank. Eventually the line descends, leading to makaʻāinana ('commoner'). Kaukaualiʻi gain rank through marriage with higher-ranking aliʻi.
- Aliʻi noanoa were chiefs born to a high chief and a commoner.

One kaukaualiʻi line descended from Moana Kāne, son of Keākealanikāne, became secondary aliʻi to the Kamehameha rulers of the kingdom and were responsible for various hana lawelawe ('service tasks'). Members of this line married into the Kamehamehas, including Charles Kanaʻina and Kekūanaōʻa. Some bore kāhili, royal standards made of feathers, and were attendants of the higher-ranking aliʻi. During the monarchy some of these chiefs were elevated to positions within the primary political bodies of the Hawaiian legislature and the king's Privy Council. All Hawaiian monarchs after Kamehameha III were the children of Kaukaualiʻi fathers who married higher ranking wives.

== List of monarchs of Hawaiian Islands ==
- Aliʻi nui of Hawaiʻi
- Aliʻi nui of Maui
- Aliʻi nui of Oʻahu
- Aliʻi nui of Kauaʻi
- Aliʻi nui of Molokai

== See also ==
- List of monarchs of Tonga
- List of monarchs of Tahiti
- List of monarchs of Huahine
- List of monarchs of Mangareva
