= Kuleana Act of 1850 (Hawaii) =

The Kuleana Act of 1850, proposed by the King in Privy Council passed by the Hawaii legislature created a system for private land ownership in seven parts. Section 1 recognized ownership of government plots occupied and improved by families. Section 2 expanded title to other types of land. Section 3 defined land boundaries and the ability to exchange portions of land. Section 4 established a system for the Hawaiian government to distribute larger parcels of land. Section 5 established the largest size of family owned lots. Section 6 attempted to distinguish between cultivated and waste lands. Section 7 established access to roads, water sources, and other natural resources.

Kuleana is a Hawaiian word, defined in the Hawaii Electronic Library as a "Right, privilege, concern, responsibility, title, business, property, estate, portion, jurisdiction, authority, liability, interest, claim, ownership, tenure, affair, province; reason, cause, function, justification; small piece of property, as within an ahupuaʻa; blood relative through whom a relationship to less close relatives is traced, as to in-laws."

== Contemporary examples ==
The Facebook founder and billionaire Mark Zuckerberg came under scrutiny in 2017 when he attempted to integrate property titles that had been established by the Kuleana Act into a 700-acre (280 ha) estate, which he intended to assemble in Hawaii by using quiet title lawsuits to establish the ownership of ambiguously-titled parcels of land.

== See also ==
- Kuleana rights
- Ahupuaʻa
- Ceded lands
- Great Māhele
- Aboriginal title in the United States
