= Monarchs of the Hawaiian Islands =

The original rulers of the Hawaiian islands (noho aliʻi o ko Hawaiʻi Pae ʻAina) were a line of native Hawaiians who were independent monarchs of various subdivisions of the land and islands of Hawaii. Their genealogy is traced to Hānalaʻanui and others. The caste system of ancient Hawaiian society was established around 1200 AD and separated the people into 4 distinct ranks that were all below the supreme ruler (ali‘i nui) of the island. The ali‘i nui would distribute the land to the lower ranking chiefs who would run the land and collect offerings and taxes. The ali‘i nui would also ultimately be responsible for the sacred kapu, a system of rules designed to control social order. The noho ali‘i were known for their brightly colored and intricately constructed battle regalia of feathered capes and helmets called a mahiole (helmet) and ʻahu ʻula (cloak or cape).

== History ==
The history of the ancient Polynesians was passed down through oral genealogy chants that were recited at both formal and family functions. The genealogy of the high chiefs could be traced back to the period believed to be inhabited by gods. The pua ali‘i were considered to be living gods. Sometime before 600, the first Polynesians began to settle the islands. By about 1000, settlements founded along the perimeters of the islands were beginning to cultivate their own foods in gardens, and by 1500, they would begin to spread inward to the interiors of the islands and religion began to be more emphasised.

A Tahitian priest named Pā‘ao is said to have brought a new order to the islands around 1200. The new order included new laws and a new social structure for the islands separating the people into classes. The Ali‘i Nui was the king, with his ‘aha kuhina just below him. The ali‘i were the royal nobles with the kahuna (priests) below them, the maka‘āinana (commoners) next, and the kauā as the lowest social caste.

== Land division ==
Land was divided up in strict adherence to the wishes of the Ali‘i Nui. The mokupuni (island) was split into several ʻāpana districts with boundaries running from the highest mountain peak to the beach and about a mile out to sea. Each district was ruled by an Aliʻi ʻAikapana appointed by the ruling chief (Alii 'Aimoku). The 'apana were further split into ahupua'au, named after the boundary altar where local taxes were collected during the Makahiki. An ahupua'au was ruled by an Alii 'Ai Ahupua'a and managed by a headman called a Konohiki.

Furthermore, each ahupua'a was cut into smaller slivers of land ('Ili Ahupua'a), each ruled by an Alii 'Ai 'Iliahupua'a. These were the divisions of land which belonging to commoners (maka'ainana). Although the Chiefs were the formal owners, the commoners were their tenants and were given use of the land.

== Duties and responsibilities ==
The ali‘i nui were responsible for making sure the people observed a strict kapu (a code of conduct relating to taboos). The system had rules regarding many aspects of Hawaiian social order, fishing rights, and even where women could eat. After the death of Kamehameha I the system was abolished, and the Hawaiian religion was also banned as Hawai’i was forcefully assimilated.

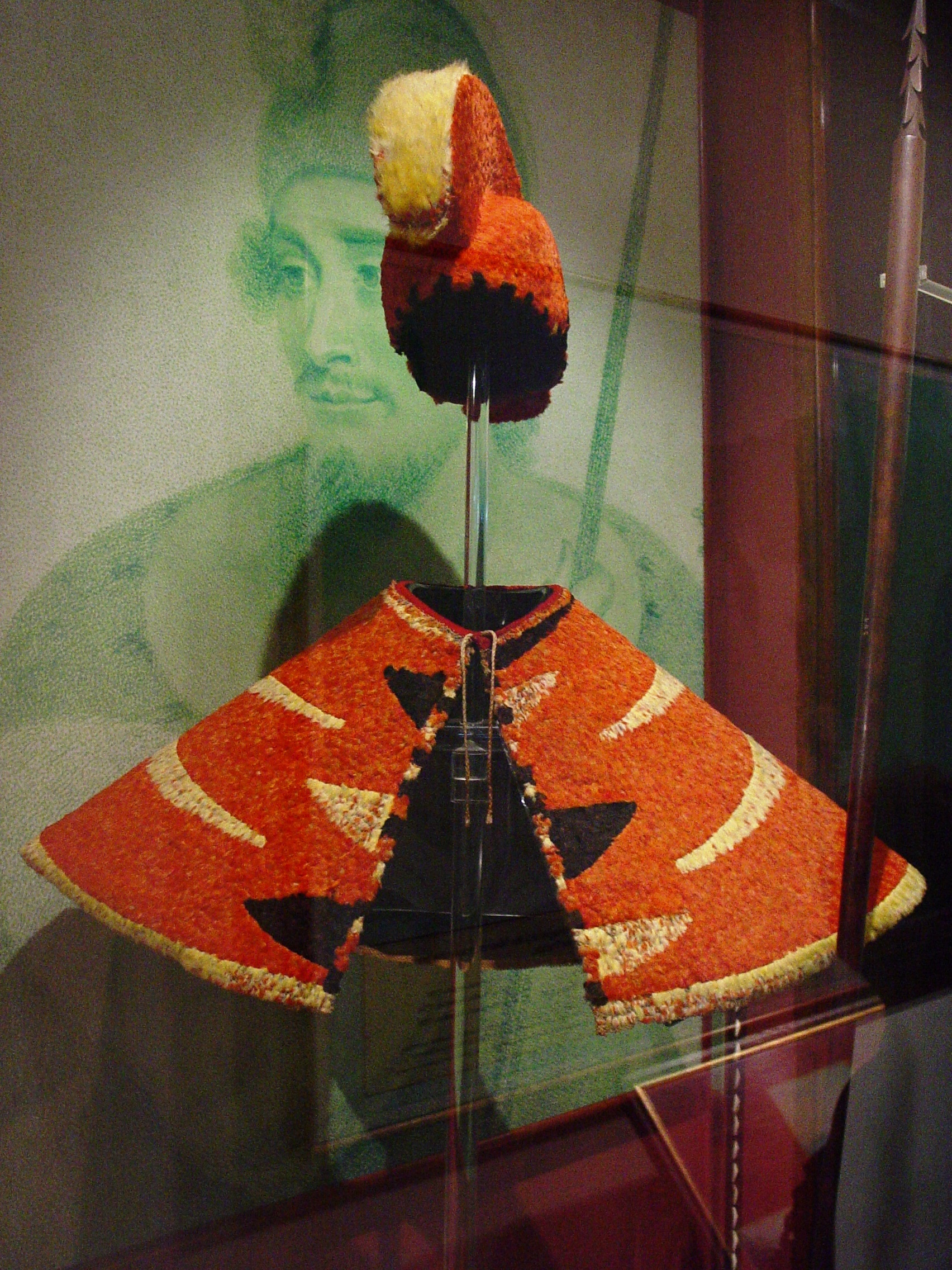
Hawaiian ruling chief's feathered 'ahu 'ula and mahiole in the Bishop Museum Oahu, Hawaii.

== Regalia and privilege ==
The ali‘i had a number of specific items, tokens and other regalia that identified them as divine, powerful, high ranking and wealthy by ancient Hawaiian standards. Many of these items were status symbols for their rarity, high value, or magnificence. The regalia was also designed to emulate European royalty after foreign contact was established on a regular basis.

The mahiole (helmet) and ʻAhu ʻula (cloak or cape) were the right of only the highest ranking chiefs. They were created using intricate feather crafting in designs to represent the divinity of the chiefs as well as their power. A single ʻahu ʻula took thousands of birds to supply feathers. The regalia were worn only during battle or ceremonial acts.

On his contact with the islands, Captain James Cook was given several ʻahu ʻula and a mahiole as gifts from Kalaniʻōpuʻu.

The Niho Palaoa is a sperm whale ivory tooth carved for the use of the ruling chiefs. It would be worn, suspended by finely coiled human hair and, when worn, is called a lei niho palaoa.

The royal standard of the ali‘i was the kāhili, a symbol of the ruling chiefs. It was a stem of bundled feathers that were carried by attendants.
