= Kuleana rights =

Kuleana rights are certain land use rights once enjoyed by Hawaiian tenant farmers and in the modern day are attached to particular plots of land. The six distinct kuleana rights are:

(1) reasonable access to the land-locked kuleana from major thoroughfares;

(2) agricultural uses, such as taro cultivation;

(3) traditional gathering rights in and around the ahupua'a [neighborhood];

(4) a house lot not larger than 1/4 acre;

(5) sufficient water for drinking and irrigation from nearby streams, including traditionally established waterways such as 'auwai;

(6) fishing rights in the kunalu (the coastal region extending from beach to reef).

A kuleana is the smallest portion of land in the traditional ahupuaʻa system of land management and would be cultivated by a single tenant family on behalf of a regional chief. These rights were first acknowledged in statute as part of the Great Māhele of King Kamehameha III and the Kuleana Act of 1850 and continue to be protected by the modern-day constitution of Hawaii and Hawaiian state law. Kuleana rights can be attached to the kuleana land itself or to a descendant's use of a specific plot.

In 2012 the Hawaiian Supreme Court confirmed the viability of Kuleana rights in the present day.

In late 2016 Mark Zuckerberg filed suit to eliminate the ownership interests of more than 100 Hawaiians in Kuleana lands located within his larger parcel. In early 2017 Zuckerberg announced that he would drop the litigation.

== See also ==
- Kuleana Act of 1850
- Ahupuaʻa
- Ceded lands
- Great Māhele
- Hawaiian home land
- Aboriginal title in the United States
