= Great Māhele =

Royal Hawaiian land redistribution program

The Great Māhele ("to divide or portion") or just the Māhele was the Hawaiian land redistribution proposed by King Kamehameha III. The Māhele was one of the most important episodes of Hawaiian history, second only to the overthrow of the Hawaiian Kingdom. While intended to provide secure title to Indigenous Hawaiians, it separated many of them from their land.

== Prior forms of land tenure ==
Hawaiian chiefs for centuries had administered lands, however unlike Western serfdom, individual people were free to move on and off these lands. Ordinary people were still required to pay tribute to ruling chiefs, but were still allowed to use natural resources as long as they respected the chiefs and environment.

With the unification of the islands by Kamehameha I, the original system of communal land tenure was used, and Kamehameha I also set aside lands for himself with his chosen chiefs running the day to day operations for him. He continued the requirement of having tenants pay a tax if they lived on the land, but could additionally request services from any tenant on the land. The latter would be reversed by Kamehameha II during his reign.

When the kingdom was united, foreigners were already spreading democratic ideas of individual rights, and soon began to influence how people saw land tenure. Western styled land tenure began to spread to the ruling aliʻi with great influence from foreign missionaries.

== Bill of Rights ==
After the 1839 Laplace Affair, advisors close to King Kauikeaouli Kamehameha III sought to protect the rights of Native Hawaiians given the growing presence of foreign gunboats. Many scholars knowledgeable in constitutional government were brought in to assist Kamehameha III and the aliʻi in drafting a new document to protect the people. This document would become the "Hawaiian Magna Carta," also known as the 1839 Hawaiian Bill of Rights.

The 1839 Hawaiian Bill of Rights was drafted by Kamehameha III and his chiefs to guarantee that the Hawaiian people would not lose their tenured land, and provided the groundwork for a free enterprise system. It guaranteed many civil liberties for Hawaiian citizens, while also ensuring their lands would not be taken without official law, nor could the government force people off their lands without official cause. The bill, however, did not guarantee any citizen the right to acquire the land they lived on.

The Hawaiian Bill of Rights document, which had an attached code of laws, was drafted by Lahainaluna missionary school alumnus Boaz Mahune, revised by the Council of Chiefs and by Kamehameha III in June 1839. The bill also served as the precursor to the 1840 Constitution of the Kingdom of Hawaii.

== 1840 Constitution of the Kingdom of Hawaii ==
The 1840 Constitution of the Kingdom of Hawaii established a constitutional monarchy. It stated that the land belonged to its people and was to be managed by the king. It established executive, legislative and judicial branches of government. The document established allodial title property rights which maintained the lands in the hands of Hawaiian subjects to mālama (nurture and sustain).

== The Land Commission ==
With growing competing interests among the foreign class and citizens of the Kingdom, Kamehameha III authorized the creation of The Land Commission in 1845. The Land Commission was created in order to assess the claims to land made by any person, foreign or native, prior to the establishment of the Māhele. This body was tasked with assessing any claim made to parcels of land, and would then determine whether or not there existed enough evidence to justify this claim. A claim would then be accepted and provided the correct award, or rejected by The Land Commission. The Land Commission worked to review claims to land, it did not distribute lands to the common people.

At the time of its creation, foreigners were not permitted to acquire any title to lands or lands in fee simple by The Land Commission. Non-citizens could own land only if they obtained a “certificate of nationality” from the government.

== The Māhele of 1848 ==
After The Land Commission had examined land claims and honored many prior claims to land, Kamehameha III met with his chiefs and with the Commission to discuss the next steps. In 1846, the Land Commission proposed the idea of dividing valuable lands into three parts: one part to be retained by the king, one part to be set aside for the chiefs and konohiki, and the third part to be distributed to the tenants or common people. Although initially hesitant, Kamehameha III agreed to the divison.

In order to protect Hawaiian lands from foreigners, Kamehameha III divided the lands among all the people of Hawaiʻi, aliʻi, konohiki and makaʻainana alike. The Mahele changed the previous land system under which the kuleana (responsibility and obligation) to mālama ʻāina was given by the mōʻī (king) to an aliʻi nui (high chief), his subordinate aliʻi and konohiki who received taxes and tribute from the people who worked the land collectively.

The Māhele came into effect on March 7, 1848. It allocated one-third of the land to the mōʻī (monarch), known as Hawaiian crown lands. Another third was allocated among the aliʻi and konohiki (chiefs and managers of each ahupuaʻa (traditional land division running from the coast to the mountaintop). The remaining one-third was given to the makaʻāinana (common people). The law required land claims to be filed within two years under the Kuleana Act of 1850. Many Hawaiians made no claim.

Most of the land was sold by the government of the Republic of Hawaii to settlers from the continental United States or auctioned to the Big Five corporations.

== Legislative action ==
=== Alien Land Ownership Act ===
While opponents Kamehameha IV, Kamehameha V and missionary physician Gerrit Judd were traveling, on July 10, 1850 the legislature passed the Alien Land Ownership Act. It allowed foreigners to hold title to land. The Act was written by Chief Justice William Little Lee. The justification was the promise of prosperity resulting from an influx of capital and labor.

=== Kuleana Act-August 6, 1850 ===
The Kuleana Act of 1850 allowed commoners to petition for title to land that they cultivated and lived on, similar to the homesteading laws used to manage land tenure in territories of the United States in the nineteenth century. It abolished the right of cultivation and pasturage on the larger, common lands, title of which went to the chief, the crown or the government.

Commoners previously could not own land and lived as tenants on land owned by their chiefs. Although the Kuleana Act gave them the opportunity to purchase land, many were not informed of this right, with communication depending upon word-of-mouth or literacy. Making a claim required money to pay for a pre-claim land survey, which many did not have. The system also required two witnesses to confirm that the claimant had worked the land. In practice, these conditions made land purchases difficult for most commoners.

About 18,000 plots of 3 acres (1.2 hectares) each were successfully claimed, representing 28,658 acres (11,597 hectares), or less than 1% of Hawaii’s land area, partly because of the commoners' unfamiliarity with the concept of private land ownership. The Kingdom's native population at the time was some 82,000. Members of higher classes and aliʻi obtained most Hawaiian land. Many successful claimants later lost their property due to the ongoing effect of Western diseases and property taxes.

== See also ==
- 1852 Constitution of the Kingdom of Hawaii
- 1864 Constitution of the Kingdom of Hawaii
- 1887 Constitution of the Kingdom of Hawaii
- 1893 Constitution of the Kingdom of Hawaii
- Hawaiian home land
- Kuleana rights
- Native Hawaiians
