= Ancient Hawaii =

Period in Hawaiian history

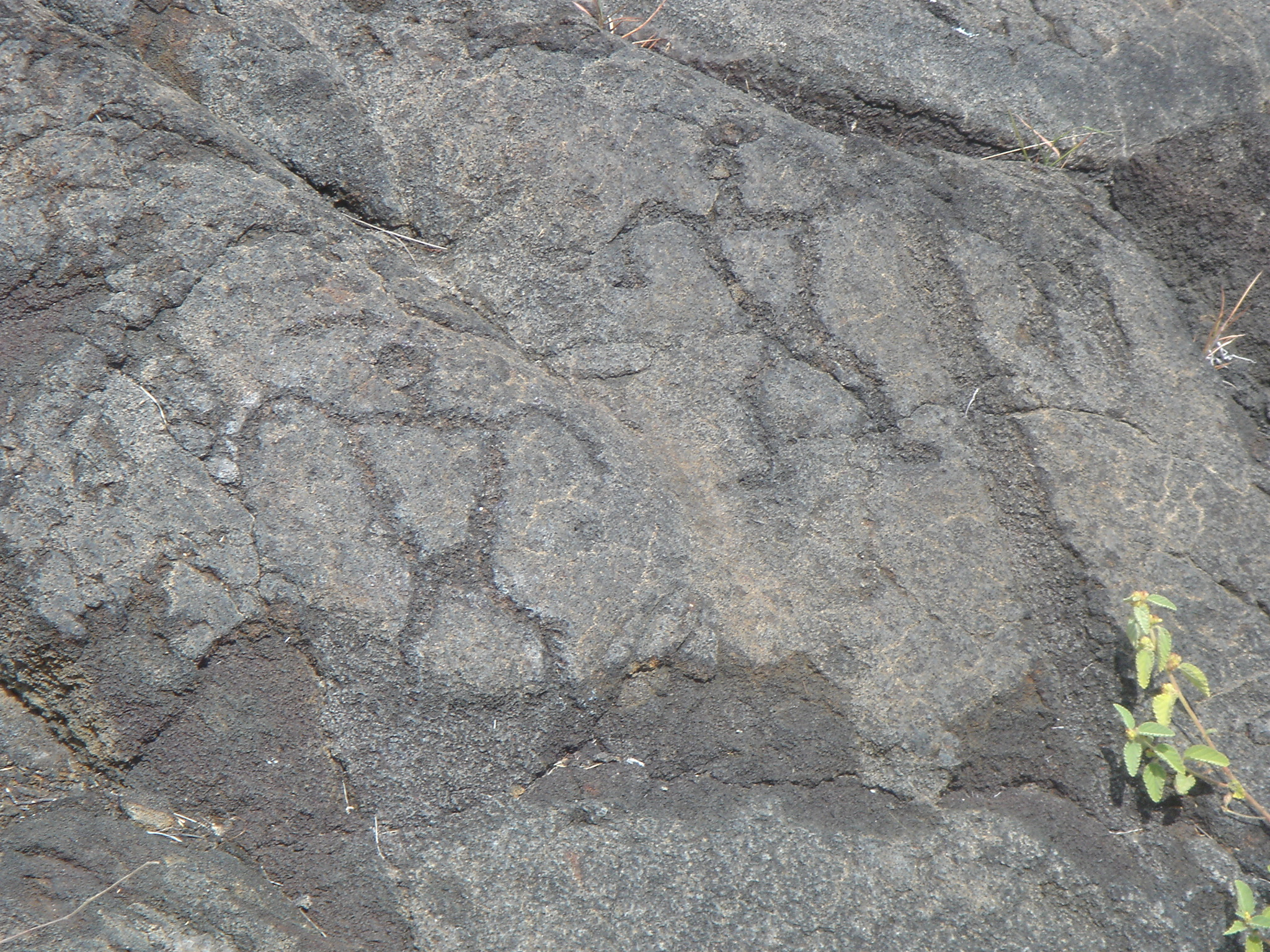
Petroglyphs at Hawaiʻi Volcanoes National Park

Ancient Hawaii is the period of Hawaiian history preceding the establishment in 1795 of the Kingdom of Hawaiʻi by Kamehameha the Great. Traditionally, researchers estimated the first settlement of the Hawaiian islands as having occurred sporadically between 400 and 1100 CE by Polynesian long-distance navigators from the Samoan, Marquesas, and Tahiti islands within what is now French Polynesia. In 2010, a study was published based on radiocarbon dating of more reliable samples which suggests that the islands were settled much later, within a short timeframe, in about 1219 to 1266.

The islands in Eastern Polynesia have been characterized by the continuities among their cultures, and the short migration period would be an explanation of this result. Diversified agroforestry and aquaculture provided sustenance for Native Hawaiian cuisine. Tropical materials were adopted for housing. Elaborate temples (called heiau) were constructed from the lava rocks available.

The rich natural resources supported a relatively dense population, organized by a ruling class and social system with religious leaders. Captain James Cook made the first known European contact with ancient Hawaiians in 1778. He was followed by many other people globally.

== Human migration and arrival ==
Map showing the migration of the Austronesians

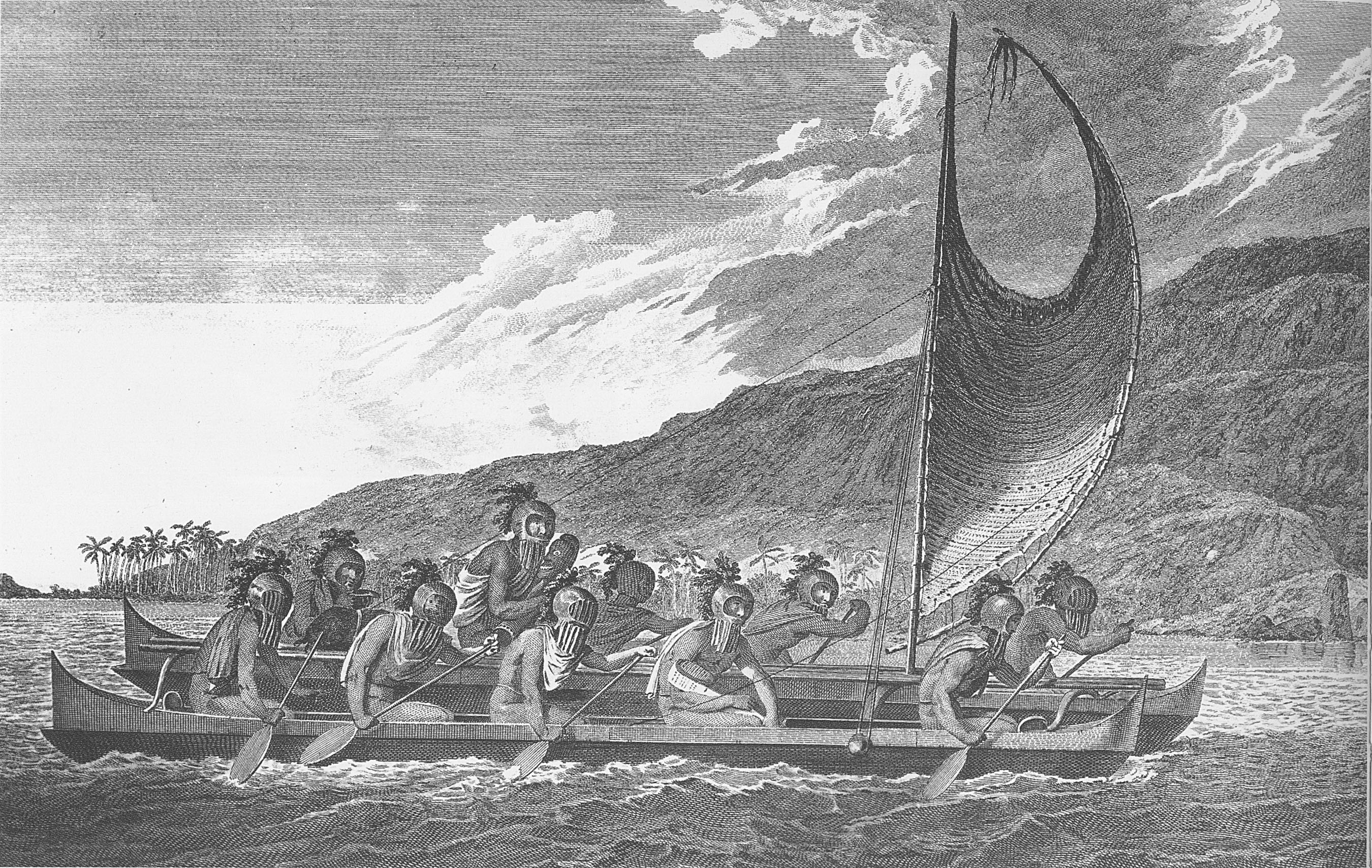
Priests traveling across Kealakekua Bay for first contact rituals. Each helmet is a gourd, with foliage and tapa strip decoration. A feather-surrounded akua is in the arms of the priest at the center of the engraving.

There have been changing views about initial Polynesian arrival to Hawai'i. Radiocarbon dating in Hawai'i initially indicated a possible settlement as early as 124 CE. Patrick Vinton Kirch's early books on Hawaiian archeology date the first Polynesian settlements to about 300 CE with more recent suggestions by Kirch of 600 CE. Other theories suggest dating as late as 700–800 CE.

In 2010, researchers announced new findings using revised, high-precision radiocarbon dating based on more reliable samples than were previously used in many dating studies. This new data indicates that the period of eastern and northern Polynesian arrival took place much later, in a shorter time frame of two waves: the "earliest in the Society Islands c. 1025–1120, four centuries later than previously assumed; then after 70–265 years, dispersal continued in one major pulse to all remaining islands c. 1190–1290." According to this research, the migration and arrival to the Hawaiian Islands took place c. 1219–1266. This rapid migration is believed to account for the "remarkable uniformity of East Polynesia culture, biology and language".

=== Establishment of permanent communities ===
Early people brought along with them clothing, plants (called "canoe plants") and livestock and established settlements along the coasts and larger valleys. Upon their arrival, the settlers grew kalo (taro), maiʻa (banana), niu (coconut), ulu (breadfruit), and raised puaʻa (pork), moa (chicken), and ʻīlio (poi dog), although these meats were eaten less often than fruits, vegetables, and seafood. Popular condiments included paʻakai (salt), ground kukui nut, limu (seaweed), and ko (sugarcane) which was used as both a sweet and a medicine. In addition to the foods they brought, the settlers also acquired ʻuala (sweet potato), which began to be cultivated across Polynesia around the year 1000 or earlier, with the earliest evidence of cultivation in Hawaii around 1300.

The Pacific rat accompanied humans on their journey to Hawaiʻi. David Burney argues that humans, along with the vertebrate animals they brought with them (pigs, dogs, chickens and rats), caused many native species of birds, plants and large land snails to become extinct in the process of colonization.

Estuaries and streams were adapted into fishponds by early Polynesian settlers, as long ago as 500 CE or earlier. Packed earth and cut stone were used to create habitat, making ancient Hawaiian aquaculture among the most advanced of the original peoples of the Pacific. A notable example is the Menehune Fishpond dating from at least 1,000 years ago, at Alekoko (Kaua'i). At the time of Captain James Cook's arrival, there were at least 360 fishponds producing 2,000,000 pounds (900,000 kg) of fish per year. Over the course of the last millennium, Hawaiians undertook "large-scale canal-fed pond field irrigation" projects for kalo (taro) cultivation.

The new settlers built hale (homes) and heiau (temples). Archaeologists currently believe that the first settlements were on the southern end of the Big Island of Hawaiʻi and that they quickly extended northwards, along the seacoasts and the easily accessible river valleys. As the population increased, settlements were made further inland. With the islands being so small, the population was very dense. Before European contact, the population had reached somewhere in the range of 200,000 to 1,000,000 people. After contact with the Europeans, however, the population steeply dropped due to various diseases including smallpox.

== Early Hawaiian sites ==
=== Waiʻahukini Rockshelter (Site H8) ===
The Wai'ahukini Rockshelter, site H8, lies within a lava tube about 600 feet (183 m) inland from the shore on the southern part of the island of Hawai'i. Based on the lack of light and space necessary for normal living conditions, it was unlikely that site H8 was used as a dwelling. Excavations of site H8 began in 1954 by William J. Bonk and students from the University of Hawaii, Hilo, and concluded in 1958. Excavation of the site revealed eight fireplaces at varying depths, as well as 1671 artifacts which included faunal remains, fishhooks, and lithic materials made of basalt and volcanic glass. The distribution of artifacts in site H8 indicated that it was continuously used as a fishing shelter until the eruption of Mauna Loa in 1868. An early estimation of the site's initial occupation was A.D. 750 by Emory and Sinoto in 1969, but a more recent study using updated radiocarbon dating methods suggested a much later date, somewhere within the mid-14th century.

=== Hālawa Dune Site ===
Located on the island of Moloka'i, the Hālawa Dune Site was first discovered in 1964 and consists of two mounds. In the summer of 1970, Patrick Vinton Kirch performed excavations on the larger of the two mounds, Mound B, revealing six major layers. Within the fourth layer were artifacts, faunal remains, and house foundations. Of the 496 artifacts unearthed in this layer, the most significant included fishhooks and adzes. The adzes recovered from Mound B were similar to those found in Nīhoa and the Necker Islands and, according to Kirch and McCoy, served as "evidence that the Hālawa Dune Site represented an early phase in the development of Hawaiian material culture." Initial radiocarbon dating for the site by Kirch suggested a range of 600 to 1200 CE, however a re-dating of samples in 2007 showed the site dated no earlier than 1300 CE, and was occupied primarily between 1400 and 1650 CE.

== Village ==
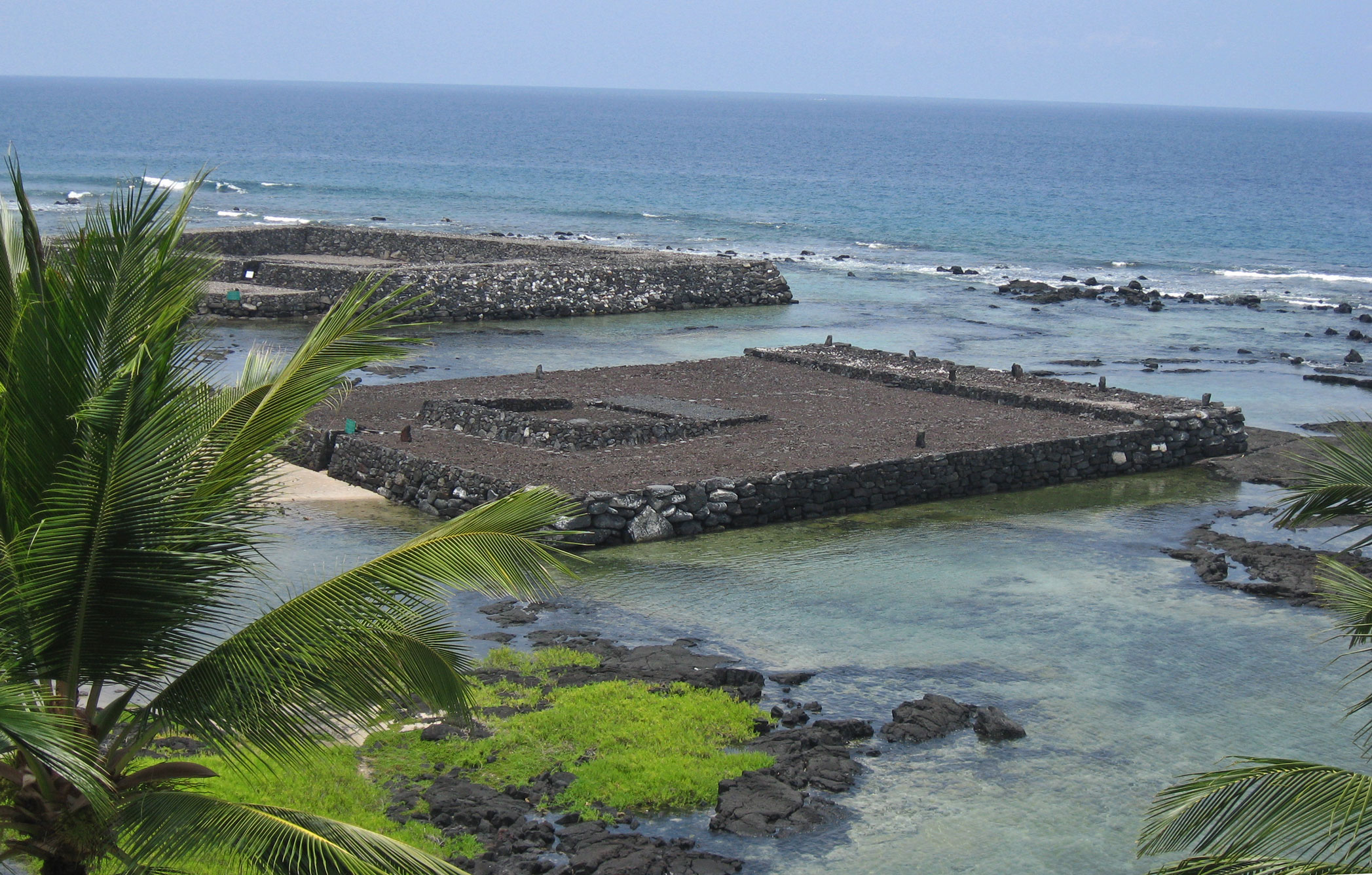
Hāpaialiʻi and Keʻeku Heiau

A traditional town of ancient Hawaiʻi included several structures. Listed in order of importance:

- Heiau, temple to the gods. There were two major types. The agricultural mapele type was dedicated to Lono, and could be built by the nobility, priests, and land division chiefs, and whose ceremonies were open to all. The second type, luakini, were large war temples, where animal and human sacrifices were made. They were built on high-rising stone terraces and adorned with wood and stone carved idols. A source of great mana or divine power, the luakini could only be entered by aliʻi, the king, important chiefs and nobility, and kahuna who were members of the Kū priesthood.
- Hale aliʻi, the house of the chief. It was used as a residence for the high chief and meeting house of the lesser chiefs. It was always built on a raised stone foundation to represent high social standing. Kāhili, or feather standards, were placed outside to signify royalty. Women and children were banned from entering.
- Hale pahu, the house of the sacred hula instruments. It held the pahu drums. It was treated as a religious space as hula was a religious activity in honor of the goddess Laka.
- Hale papaʻa, the house of royal storage. It was built to store royal implements including fabrics, prized nets and lines, clubs, spears and other weapons.
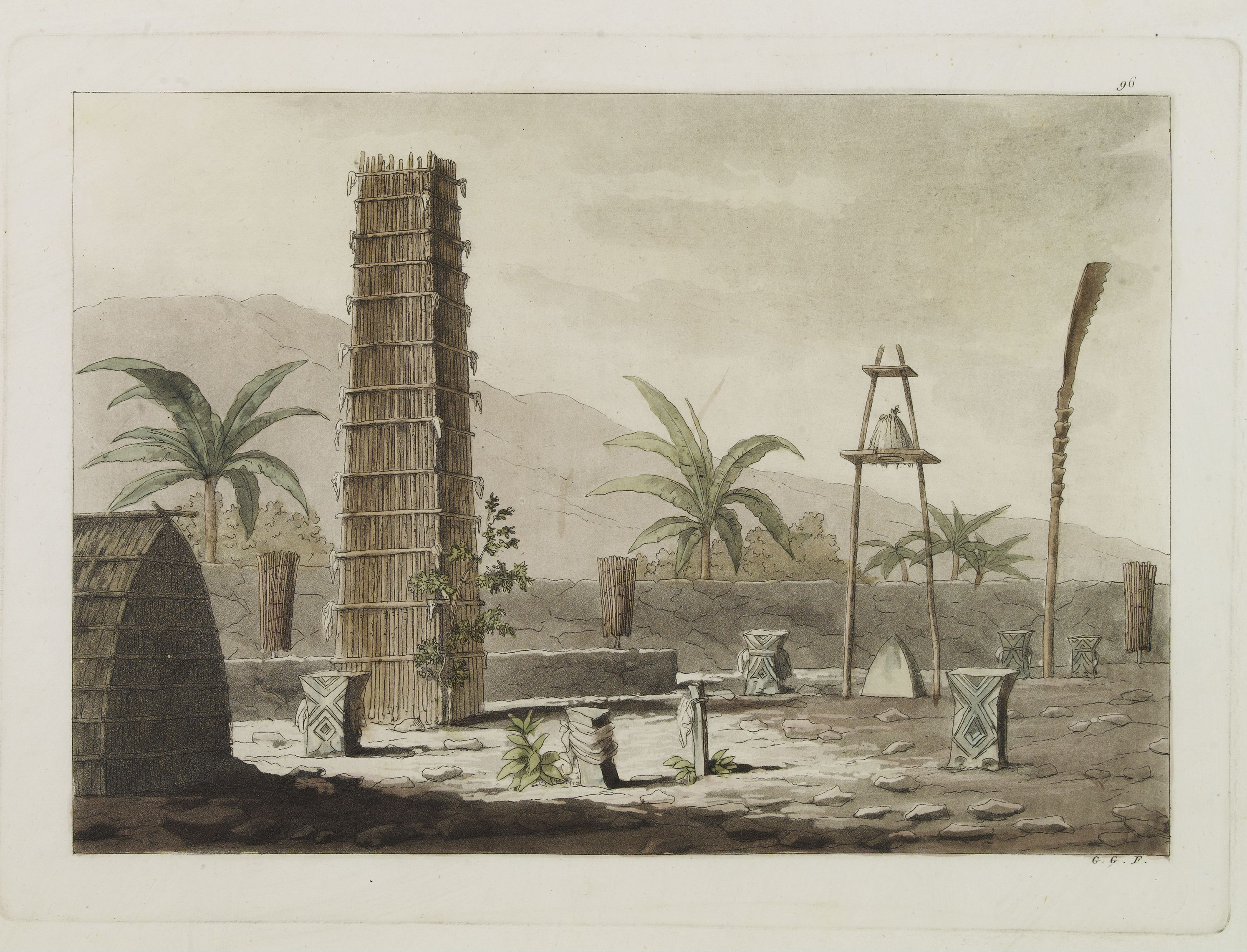
- A drawing of a heiau at Waimea, Kauai.
  Hale ulana, the house of the weaver. It was the house where craftswomen would gather each day to manufacture the village baskets, fans, mats and other implements from dried pandanus leaves called lauhala.
- Hale mua, the men's eating house. It was considered a sacred place because it was used to carve stone idols of ʻaumakua or ancestral gods. The design was meant for the men to be able to enter and exit quickly.
- Hale ʻaina, the women's eating house. Women ate at their own separate eating house. Men and women could not eat with each other for fear that men were vulnerable while eating to have their mana, or divine spirit, stolen by women.
- Hale waʻa, the house of the canoe. It was built along the beaches as a shelter for their fishing vessels. Hawaiians also stored koa logs used to craft the canoes.
- Hale lawaiʻa, the house of fishing. It was built along the beaches as a shelter for their fishing nets and lines. Nets and lines were made by a tough rope fashioned from woven coconut husks. Fish hooks were made of human, pig or dog bone. Implements found in the hale lawaiʻa were some of the most prized possessions of the entire village.
- Hale noho, the living house. It was built as sleeping and living quarters for the Hawaiian family unit.
- Imu, the communal earth oven. Dug in the ground, it was used to cook the entire village's food including puaʻa or pork. Only men cooked using the imu.

== Caste system ==
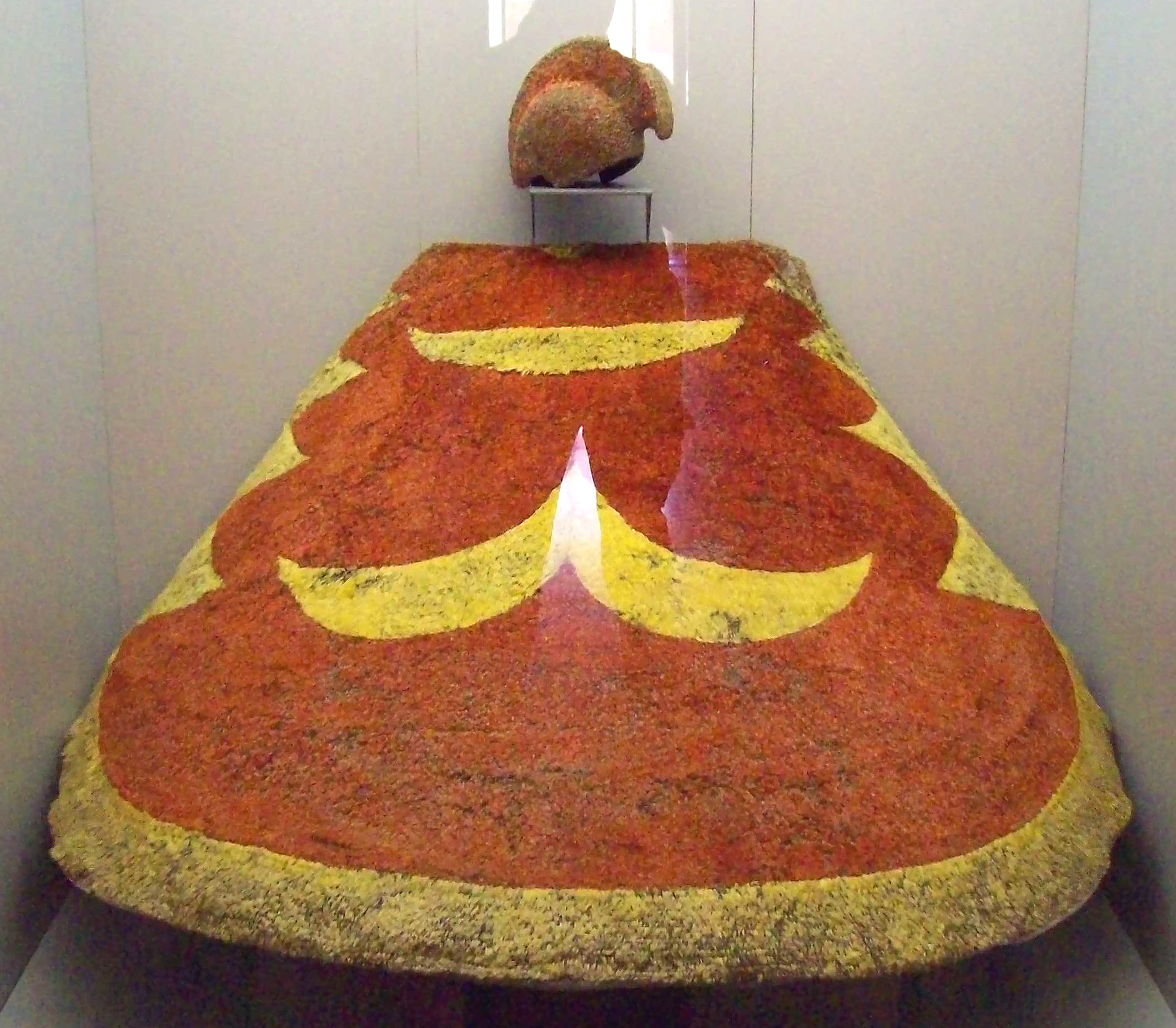
18th-century Hawaiian helmet and cloak, signs of royalty

Ancient Hawaiʻi was a caste society developed from ancestral Polynesians. In The overthrow of the kapu system in Hawaii, Stephenie Seto Levin describes the main classes:

- Aliʻi. This class consisted of the high and lesser chiefs of the realms. They governed with divine power (mana) within a sometimes theocratic system.
- Kahuna. Priests who conducted religious ceremonies, at the heiau and elsewhere. Professionals included master carpenters and boatbuilders, chanters, dancers, genealogists, physicians and healers.
- Makaʻāinana. Commoners who farmed, fished, and exercised the simpler crafts. They labored not only for themselves and their families, but to support the chiefs and kahuna.
- Kauwā. A broad and degrading category of servants, slaves, and outcasts. Marriage between higher castes and the kauwā was strictly forbidden. The kauwā worked for the chiefs, and males were often used as human sacrifices (via drowning) at the luakini heiau. (Lawbreakers of other castes and defeated political opponents were also sometimes used in human sacrifices.)

== Education ==
Hawaiian youth learned life skills and religion at home, often with grandparents. For "bright" children a system of apprenticeship existed in which very young students would begin learning a craft or profession by assisting an expert, or kahuna. As spiritual powers were perceived by Hawaiians to imbue all of nature, experts in many fields of work were known as kahuna, a term commonly understood to mean priest. The various types of kahuna passed on knowledge of their profession, be it in "genealogies, or mele, or herb medicine, or canoe building, or land boundaries", etc. by involving and instructing apprentices in their work. More formal schools existed for the study of hula, and likely for the study of higher levels of sacred knowledge.

The kahuna took the apprentice into his household as a member of the family, although often "the tutor was a relative". During a religious "graduation" ceremony, "the teacher consecrated the pupil, who thereafter was one with the teacher in psychic relationship as definite and obligatory as blood relationship". Like the children learning from their grandparents, children who were apprentices learned by watching and participating in daily life. Children were discouraged from asking questions in traditional Hawaiian culture.

== Land tenure ==
In Hawaiian ideology, one does not "own" the land, but merely dwells on it. The belief was that both the land and the gods were immortal. This then informed the belief that land was also godly, and therefore above mortal and ungodly humans, and humans therefore could not own land. The Hawaiians thought that all land belonged to the gods (akua).

The aliʻi were believed to be "managers" of land. That is, they controlled those who worked on the land, the makaʻāinana.

On the death of one chief and the accession of another, lands were re-apportioned—some of the previous "managers" would lose their lands, and others would gain them. Lands were also re-apportioned when one chief defeated another and re-distributed the conquered lands as rewards to his warriors.

In practice, commoners had some security against capricious re-possession of their houses and farms. They were usually left in place, to pay tribute and supply labor to a new chief, under the supervision of a new konohiki, or overseer.

This system of land tenure has similarities with the feudal system prevalent in Europe during the Middle Ages.

The ancient Hawaiians had the ahupuaʻa as their source of water management. Each ahupuaʻa was a sub-division of land from the mountain to the sea. The Hawaiians used the water from the rain that ran through the mountains as a form of irrigation. Hawaiians also settled around these parts of the land because of the farming that was done.

== Religion and the kapu system ==
Religion held ancient Hawaiian society together, affecting habits, lifestyles, work methods, social policy and law. The legal system was based on religious kapu, or taboos. There was a correct way to live, to worship, and even to eat. Examples of kapu included the provision that men and women could not eat together (ʻAikapu religion). Fishing was limited to specified seasons of the year. The shadow of the aliʻi must not be touched as it was stealing his mana.

The kapu system is hypothesized to have come from a second wave of migrations in 1000–1300. Tahitian influence spread the kapu system, which governed Hawaiian society by strict rules. Human sacrifice was a part of their new religious observance, and the aliʻi gained power over the counsel of Kahuna on the islands.

Kapu was derived from traditions and beliefs from Hawaiian worship of gods, demigods and ancestral mana. The forces of nature were personified as the main gods of Kū (God of war), Kāne (god of light and life), Kanaloa (god of death), and Lono (god of peace and growth). Well-known lesser gods include Pele (goddess of fire) and her sister Hiʻiaka (goddess of dance). In a famous creation story, the demigod Māui fished the islands of Hawaiʻi from the sea after a little mistake he made on a fishing trip. From Haleakalā, Māui ensnared the sun in another story, forcing him to slow down so there were equal periods of darkness and light each day.

The Hawaiian worldview allows for different gods and spirits to imbue any aspect of the natural world. From this perspective, in addition to his presence in lightning and rainbows, the god of light and life, Kāne, can be present in rain and clouds and a peaceful breeze (typically the "home" of Lono).

Although all food and drink had religious significance to the ancient Hawaiians, special cultural emphasis was placed on ʻawa (kava) due to its narcotic properties. This root-based beverage, a psychoactive and a relaxant, was used to consecrate meals and commemorate ceremonies. It is often referred to in Hawaiian chant. Different varieties of the root were used by different castes, and the brew served as an "introduction to mysticism".

== Rulers ==
The four biggest islands, the island of Hawaiʻi, Maui, Kauaʻi and Oʻahu were generally ruled by their own aliʻi nui (supreme ruler) with lower ranking subordinate chiefs called aliʻi ʻaimoku, ruling individual districts with land agents called konohiki.

All these dynasties were interrelated and regarded all the Hawaiian people (and possibly all humans) as descendants of legendary parents, Wākea (symbolizing the air) and his wife Papa (symbolizing the earth). Up to the late eighteenth century, the island of Hawaiʻi had been ruled by one line descended from Umi-a-Liloa. At the death of Keaweʻīkekahialiʻiokamoku, a lower ranking chief, Alapainui, overthrew the two sons of the former ruler who were next in line as the island's aliʻi nui.

Assuming five to ten generations per century, the Aliʻi ʻAimoku dynasties were around three to six centuries old at 1800 CE. The Tahitian settlement of the Hawaiian islands is believed to have taken place in the thirteenth century. The aliʻi and other social castes were presumably established during this period.

== First recorded European contact ==
By chance in January 1778, British Captain James Cook encountered the Hawaiian Islands while crossing the Pacific during his third voyage of exploration. He landed first on Kauaʻi, then Niʻihau before leaving the vicinity to continue his mission to explore the Pacific coast of North America.

Cook's two ships returned to the islands in November to re-supply, first sailing along the coast of Maui before eventually reaching an anchorage at Kealakekua Bay on Hawaii island. Some Hawaiians believed Cook was a sign from their god Lono. Cook's mast and sails coincidentally resembled the emblem (a mast and sheet of white kapa) that symbolized Lono in their religious rituals; the ships arrived during the Makahiki season dedicated to peace. Later, Cook was killed as he attempted to kidnap Kalaniʻōpuʻu, the ruling chief of the island of Hawaii and left behind on the beach by his retreating sailors. The British demanded that his body be returned, but the Hawaiians had already performed funerary rituals of their tradition.

This first European contact with the Hawaiian islands marked the beginning of the end of the Ancient Hawaiʻi period. After Cook's visit and the publication of several books relating his voyages, the Hawaiian Islands attracted European and American explorers, traders, and whalers, who found the islands to be a convenient harbor and source of supplies. Within a few decades Kamehameha I used European warfare tactics and some firearms and cannons to unite the islands into the Kingdom of Hawaiʻi.

== See also ==
- Māori culture
- Mary Kawena Pukui, scholar of ancient Hawaiian culture
- Polynesian culture
- List of monarchs (Aliʻi ʻAimoku) of Hawaii
- List of monarchs (Aliʻi ʻAimoku) of Kauai
- List of monarchs (Aliʻi ʻAimoku) of Oahu
- List of monarchs (Aliʻi ʻAimoku) of Maui
- List of monarchs (Aliʻi ʻAimoku) of Molokaʻi
