= Radiocarbon dating in Hawaii =

There have been changing views about initial Polynesian discovery and settlement of Hawaii, beginning with Abraham Fornander in the late 19th century and continuing through early archaeological investigations of the mid-20th century. There is no definitive date for the Polynesian discovery of Hawaii. Through the use of more advanced radiocarbon methods, taxonomic identification of samples, and stratigraphic archaeology, during the 2000s the consensus was established that the first arrived in Kauai sometime around 1000 AD, and in Oahu sometime between 1100 AD and 1200 AD. However, with more testing and refined samples, including chronologically tracing settlements in Society Islands and the Marquesas, two archipelagoes which have long been considered to be the immediate source regions for the first Polynesian voyagers to Hawaii, it has been concluded that the settlement of the Hawaiian Islands took place around 1219 to 1266 AD, with the paleo-environmental evidence of agriculture indicating the Ancient Hawaiian population to have peaked around 1450 AD around 140,000 to 200,000.

== Pre-radiocarbon dating theories ==
Polynesian oral traditions and genealogy studied extensively by director of the Bishop Museum in Honolulu, Abraham Fornander in the mid-1800s, relied on native Hawaiian texts suggested that by 1865 there had been 28 generations of Hawaiians. Chronologically that put the first voyages and settlement of the islands occurring around AD 965–1065. Subsequent director of the Bishop Museum, Te Rangi Hiroa postulated though that Menehune may have arrived as early as 450 AD. The next director Kenneth Emory, relying on linguistics and the oral traditions put the settlement around 1150 AD, suggesting that it could have been as early as 1000 AD. However, with the invention of radiocarbon dating Emory and his colleagues would later revisit their conclusions.

== Archaeology combined with radiocarbon dating ==
With the invention of radiocarbon dating archaeologists immediately scoured the islands in search of the earliest possible samples. One of the first samples from the Pu‘u Ali‘i sand dune came suggested as early as 124±60 AD. Over the next ten years the early radiocarbon dating of Hawaiian samples started to return dates suggesting sometime first humans arrived sometime between 300 AD to 800 AD casting doubt on Pu‘u Ali‘i sand dune sample. Accordingly, it was retested with the help of a second lab and to their dismay could not be replicated and was instead revised to roughly 1000 to 1350 AD. However a sample from Waiahukini was interpreted as beginning around AD 750 which now formed the basis of a claimed first discovery. Testing continued at sites around Hawaii to find the earliest dates. At the same time of the research done by the Honolulu Museum, the University of Honolulu excavated several sites in O'ahu which would suggest dates of AD 600 to 1100. However these results did not match the archaeological results obtained from examining the spread of Polynesians from their homeland in Tahiti. Regardless by the close of the 1970s a model of Polynesian settlement chronology emerged suggesting multiple contacts with the island relying on the Pu‘u Ali‘i sand dune sample posited (although revised in 1969 as actually sometime between 1000 and 1350 AD) as supporting a possible earlier wave of settlement in 124 AD, with a long pause in between. For a time this Polynesian triangle became the "orthodox" scenario. By the 1990s with the advances in radiocarbon dating taking place and more samples tracking the spread across the Polynesian islands, including New Zealand archaeologists found significant support for a late colonization of the eastern Polynesian islands, suggesting Hawai'i, like New Zealand was colonized around 1000-1200 AD.

== Refinements in radiocarbon dating ==
Since the invention of Radiocarbon dating in 1949 scientists started to recognize various problems with radiocarbon dating from the labs to the samples being submitted. For instance the preliminary samples tested by Emory and Sinoto who raced to determine first contact had rather large standard deviations, reflecting the crude solid-carbon counting methods first used by the pioneers of the radiocarbon dating method. By late 1970s the most significant improvement by then was the use of accelerator mass spectrometry or AMS.

Equally important to the refinements in laboratory methods was the realization by archaeologists that they needed to pay close attention to the kinds of samples they submitted for dating. This was especially the case for wood charcoal, perhaps the most commonly dated material from Polynesian sites. In the early years of radiocarbon dating, the tendency was to select the largest pieces of charcoal. The problem, of course, was that such samples in many cases included old growth timber, which had an “in built” age that was potentially much older than the time at which the wood was actually burnt in the hearth or oven. Therefore, the date returned by the radiocarbon lab may have been an accurate indication of the age of the timber, but not of the “target date” of human use of the site. Further because coastal sites were common, there was also the likelihood of older drift wood was used for fuel with age already built in. Accordingly, in the early 1990s scientists began a taxonomic identification of wood charcoal based on anatomical characteristics by comparison to a reference collection of known woody plant species for the particular region or island which allowed scientists to refine their samples for testing further. Unfortunately, not all archaeologists working Polynesia had availed themselves of these advances casting doubt in the field of study for a time.

== Emerging chronological picture for eastern Polynesia ==
Regardless a chronological picture for eastern Polynesia using AMD radiocarbon methods in the 1980s on identified samples started to lend considerable support to the "short chronology" of settlement, whereby the central archipelagoes of Eastern Polynesia did not begin to be colonized until after AD 800 or later.

By the early 1990s “chronometric hygiene” radiocarbon dating aka, high-precision radiocarbon dating approach of samples also started to be employed causing further reconsideration of old orthodoxies. Using chronometric hygiene, previous samples from all around Hawai'i were retested. On the lowest calibration of testing the retested samples returned dates of between 1100 and 1200 AD, with some samples from Kaua'i going back to around 1000 AD.

By 2010 some of the latest researchers using high-precision radiocarbon dating and more reliable samples established that the period of eastern and northern Polynesian colonization took, in a shorter time frame and much later than. Note from the perspective of Hawaiian settlement are the colonization dates for the Society Islands and the Marquesas, as these two archipelagoes have long been considered to be the immediate source regions for the first Polynesian voyagers to Hawai‘i. Accordingly, the "earliest in the Society Islands A.D. ~1025–1120, dispersal continued in one major pulse to all remaining islands A.D. ~1190–1290." Thus this put the settlement of the Hawaiian Islands taking place ~1219–1266CE. This rapid colonization is believed to account for the "remarkable uniformity of East Polynesia culture, biology and language."

== Paleo environment evidence ==
Using plant fossils, charcoal deposit particulates and organic samples and high-precision radiocarbon dating there has been evidence of influences from humans sometimes determined to be around 1000 AD in Kaua'i. and as early as 1300 AD in Moloka‘i with main occupation occurring between 1400 and 1650 AD when the population peaked. For further discussion of pre-contact population changes see Discovery and settlement of Hawaii,

== See also ==
- Ancient Hawaii
- Kingdom of Hawaii
- Hawaiian population
- Ancient Hawaiian population
- Discovery and settlement of Hawaii
