= Ancient Hawaiian population =

At time of Captain Cook's arrival

The exact population of the Hawaiian Islands at the time of Captain James Cook's arrival is not known; however, the large range of estimates from 100,000 to 1,000,000 illustrate the controversial nature of the topic and disagreement over the best methods for calculating it. What is known is that the first voyaging canoes that landed on Hawaiian shores during the discovery and settlement of Hawaii cannot have carried more than a hundred people, and perhaps even fewer. For the purposes of this article, "ancient" Hawaii is defined as the period beginning with the first arrival of human settlers, around AD 1100, and ending with their initial contact with the first Western visitors.

== Constant population growth theory ==
In the popular model of constant population growth, the human population of Hawaii expanded steadily from the first settlements until the arrival of Captain Cook, when growth halted because of the introduction of unfamiliar diseases. This theory was originally advanced by Robert C. Schmitt and Lynn Zane, and it is still used to support an estimate of 800,000 to 1,000,000 people in the Hawaiian Islands in 1778. However, this theory relies on a hypothetical settlement date of AD 500 along with a doubling of population every 110 years. Modern high-precision radiocarbon dating in Hawaii has since refuted that date, as well as the notion of linear population growth. Still, most Archaeologists of Hawaii agree that the centuries preceding Western contact were ones of population growth.

== Arrested population growth ==
The theory of constant population growth in Hawaii has scant support from the archaeological data and is contradicted by paleo-environmental evidence and radiocarbon dating of historical sites. The human imprint on the land increases along with population, as more and more people require more and more food, light, and heat. Thus there would be more fires and more wood charcoal produced, with increases correlated with population growth. Accordingly, the evidence indicates a rather complex model of arrested population growth, especially as a consequence of island life. This theory finds corroboration in archaeological censuses of abandoned habitation sites on leeward Hawai'i Island and Kaho'olawe Island, which indicate that the population peaked before Cook's arrival. The arrested growth model fits well with an estimated pre-contact population of between 100,000 and 150,000, derived primarily from the study of historical records.

Population estimates based on an initial settlement date of ca. AD 1150 and paleo-environmental evidence of early human impact on the land completely contradict the theory of constant population growth. Instead, the estimated population curve can be divided into three sections: pre-settlement, when no humans lived in Hawaii; the initial settlement and growth phase, from approximately 100 people around 1150 AD to a peak in 1450 of approximately 150,000 people; and a phase of stability between 1450 and 1778, when apparent declines were followed by periods of growth.

As population grew, so did its environmental imprint, including forest clearing by burning, building of heiau at agricultural sites, and the decline of indigenous plants. The paleo-environmental data show that during 1450-1778 the construction of heiau slowed dramatically, as did the clearing of land for agriculture. Accordingly, the estimated population in 1778 was 110,000-150,000.

== Demographic Backcasting ==
Swanson examines the controversy surrounding the Hawaiian population and uses a new method of demographic backcasting to estimate a Hawaiian population of 683,200 in the year 1778 when Captain Cook arrived. In this methodology, Swanson uses existing population data from the Kingdom of Hawaii censuses from 1850, 1860, 1890 and the US Census from 1900 to examine the existing demographic structures and then use this to estimate previous population size. He then compares the rate of population declines from 1778 to 1900 and finds it consistent with the known impact of introduced infectious diseases in new populations.

== Precontact ==
It is believed relying on the archaeological data and oral traditions, that the social organizations evolved after the initial settlement as the population increased. During the initial settlement and growth phase on the island the social organizations were characterized by semi-independent chiefdoms organized as single nonegalitarian corporate units on each island, which is essentially the same as ancestral Polynesian society. During the expansion inland and growth phase which lasted until about 1500–1550, the formation of basic ahupua'a land units which saw the widening of the gap between chief and commoner as the concept of kinship increased within the local community with the formation of ali'i and maka'ainana classes. The significant reduction of population in the 16-17th century was a result of warfare and conquest among competing chiefs

== Table ==
Estimated Population
| Term | Population | Notes |
|---|---|---|
| 1000 to 1219. | ~100's | |
| 1219–1450 | up to 160,000 | |
| 1450–1500 | ~110,000 to 160,000 | Peak of heiau construction as well as agricultural burning of lands for farming. |
| 1500–1600 | ~150,000 | Decreasing agricultural burning until ~1600. |
| 1600–1700 | ~96,000 | Population declined |
| 1700–1778 | ~100,000-400,000 | Population bounced back |
| 1778 | ~120,000 - 600,000 | |
| 1805 | 150,000 to 200,000 | |
| 1819 | ~144,000 | |
| 1850 | 84,165 | |
| 1872 | 56,897 | |
| 1896 | 109,020 | |
