= Ceded lands (Hawaii) =

Disputed land in the state of Hawaii

In 1898, the United States Congress annexed Hawaiʻi based on a Joint Resolution of Annexation (Joint Resolution). Questions about the legitimacy of the U.S. acquiring Hawaii through a joint resolution, rather than a treaty, were actively debated in Congress in 1898, and is the subject of ongoing debate. Upon annexation, the Republic of Hawai‘i transferred approximately 1.8 million acres of Hawaiian Government and Crown Lands to the United States (U.S.), which are today held by the State of Hawaiʻi. In the 1993 Apology Resolution, the U.S. government officially apologized to the Native Hawaiian people, acknowledging that the Republic of Hawaiʻi transferred these lands "without the consent of or any compensation to the Native Hawaiian people of Hawaiʻi or their sovereign government" and that "the indigenous Hawaiian people never directly relinquished their claims . . . over their national lands to the United States." Although the lands are commonly referred to as "ceded lands" or "public lands," some refer to them as "seized lands" or "Hawaiian national lands" or "crown lands" to highlight the illegal nature of the land transfer, acknowledge different interpretations of the legal effect of the Joint Resolution, and to recognize that Native Hawaiians maintain claims to these lands. Many Native Hawaiian individuals and organizations insist on the return of title, which would be consistent with international law and recognition of the rights of Indigenous peoples, whereas others seek back rent for the use of the land.

At present, control of these lands is divided mostly between the U.S. government and the State of Hawaiʻi. There have been several efforts over the years to create an accurate inventory of ceded lands. In 2018, the Department of Land and Natural Resources launched the Public Land Trust Information System, a web-based inventory of state and county-managed lands. A number of facilities, including airports and military bases, are located on former Kingdom Government and Crown lands, which contributes to controversy surrounding the issue.

== Historical background ==
The 1848 Māhele began the conversion of Hawaiʻi's communal land tenure system to a western fee simple system for the purpose of protecting Hawaiian land in the face of encroaching foreign interests.

On January 17, 1893, a small group of businessmen, backed by the U.S. military and diplomatic personnel, illegally overthrew the Hawaiian Kingdom. This led to the establishment of a Provisional Government (January 17, 1893 - July 3, 1894) and then the Republic of Hawaiʻi (July 4, 1894 - August 12, 1898). The 1895 Land Act repealed most of the land laws of the Hawaiian Kingdom and merged the Government and Crown Lands – two distinct categories of landholdings with different purposes – into one category: "public lands." The 1895 Land Act also repealed a previous 1865 law making the Crown lands inalienable, allowing commissioners of Public Lands to sell “land patents” at public auction and establish a comprehensive homesteading program on the public lands. The Joint Resolution recognized the "special nature of the Government and Crown Lands, stating that their revenues and proceeds should be used solely for the benefit of the inhabitants of the Hawaiian Islands for educational and other public purposes.”

== Status of lands during the territorial period ==
From 1900 through 1959, the United States governed Hawaiʻi as a territory. Although the U.S. asserted title to the Government and Crown lands during this period, the Territory of Hawaiʻi exercised administrative control and use of the lands. Funds received from disposition of these lands were to be used for the benefit of Hawaiʻi's people. Because both the 1898 Joint Resolution and the Organic Act of 1900 recognized that these lands were impressed with a unique trust, grounded in Hawaiian monarchs' duties to care for their people but now held under another government's proprietorship, some argue that Hawaiʻi's Government and Crown lands never became part of the federal public domain – "the United States received ʻlegal' title to the lands, while beneficial title rested with the inhabitants of Hawaiʻi."

The Hawaiian Homes Commission Act of 1921 (HHCA) withdrew approximately 203,500 acres (82,400 ha) of public land, including Crown Lands, bringing them under the jurisdiction of the Hawaiian Homes Commission, to be leased to Hawaiian Homes beneficiaries under 99-year leases. By statehood in 1959, 287,078.44 acres (116,176.52 ha) of Hawai‘i’s former Government and Crown Lands had been set aside for federal government use. For instance, the island of Kahoʻolawe and Mākua Valley on Oʻahu were set aside for military use.

== Status of lands after statehood ==
In 1959, the U.S. Congress passed the Hawaiʻi Admission Act. Effective upon Hawaiʻi's admission into the Union, the U.S. transferred the majority of Government and Crown lands to the State of Hawaiʻi, including the HHCA lands, which assumed the role of trustee as a condition of statehood. Under pressure from the federal government, the new State of Hawaiʻi leased a total of 30,176.185 acres (12,211.869 ha) back to the U.S. for sixty-five years for a dollar for each lease. Section 5(f) of the Admission Act establishes the state's responsibilities in relation to those lands as follows: "the proceeds from the sale or other disposition of any such lands and the income therefrom, shall be held by said State as a public trust for the support of public schools and other educational institutions, for the betterment of the conditions of native Hawaiians, as defined in the Hawaiian Homes Commission Act, 1920, as amended, for the development of farm and home ownership on as widespread a basis as possible[,] for the making of public improvements, and for the provision of lands for public use."

Almost twenty years later, delegates to the 1978 State of Hawaiʻi Constitutional Convention acknowledged that little attention had been given to the trust language in Section 5(f) especially as it related to Native Hawaiians, and added new sections to the State Constitution to implement the trust provisions. They created the Office of Hawaiian Affairs (OHA), and directed that OHA was to receive the income and proceeds derived from a pro rata portion of the trust revenue. In addition, Article XII, Section 6, of the Constitution "requires the OHA Trustees to manage and administer income and proceeds from a variety of sources, including a pro rata portion of the public land trust".

== Income and proceeds from trust lands ==
In 1980, the State Legislature passed legislation requiring that 20 percent of ceded land revenues would go to OHA. Since then, the state and OHA have disagreed about which lands OHA should receive revenues from, among other issues. In 1990, the Legislature passed Act 304, which defined how OHA’s 20 percent share would be derived. Despite this, OHA and the state remained in dispute about some categories of trust revenue, including proceeds from the Honolulu airport on ceded lands. In 2001, the Hawaiʻi Supreme Court invalidated Act 304 in the case OHA v. State, but acknowledged the State's obligation: “it is incumbent upon the legislature to enact legislation that gives effect to the rights of native Hawaiians to benefit from the ceded lands trust.” In 2006, the Legislature passed Act 178, which established the interim revenue to be transferred to OHA annually as $15.1 million. It also required a one-time payment of $17.5 million to OHA for past underpayments of revenues and required the Department of Land and Natural Resources to conduct annual accounting for revenues from all ceded lands. In 2012, OHA and the state reached another settlement through Act 15, which resolved back payment claims from 1978 through June 2012 and transferred ten parcels of property in Kakaʻako to OHA.

The controversy over public land trust revenue remains ongoing, and recent efforts to determine the actual amount of OHA's pro rata share have not been successful. For example, in 2018 and 2019, relying on the definition of revenue historically agreed to by OHA and the state, data collected from agency reporting, and an analysis of underreported receipts, proposed legislation declared that the amount of revenue OHA should receive annually is closer to $35 million, not $15.1 million.

== Litigation involving the sale and transfer of trust lands ==
After the U.S. Congress passed the landmark Apology Resolution in 1993, the Hawaii State Legislature passed similar legislation acknowledging that many Native Hawaiians view the 1893 overthrow as illegal and that lands taken without their consent should be returned. OHA and four individual plaintiffs filed suit to challenge a pending transfer of ceded lands and further enjoin the state from selling any other ceded lands. In January 2008, the Hawaiʻi Supreme Court ruled in favor of OHA and the individual plaintiffs. The Court also determined that monetary payments would not suffice because of Hawaiians' intimate cultural and spiritual connection with the lands. The Court acknowledged: "(1) the cultural importance of the land to native Hawaiians, (2) that the ceded lands were illegally taken from the native Hawaiian monarchy, (3) that future reconciliation between the state and the native Hawaiian people is contemplated, and, (4) once any ceded lands are alienated from the public lands trust, they will be gone forever."

In 2009, the U.S. Supreme Court reversed, overturning the portion of the decision based on federal law and remanding the case to the Hawaiʻi Supreme Court to reconsider its decision based on state law. The majority of the suit was subsequently settled out of court, and the Hawaiʻi Supreme Court dismissed the remaining, non-settled claims as unripe.

In 2011, a law was passed requiring a two-thirds majority approval in the Legislature for any permanent alienation of ceded lands. In 2014, a law was passed requiring a simple majority approval for the proposed exchange of public lands for private lands.

== Litigation involving the state's management of trust lands ==
One major concern of Native Hawaiians and other Hawaiʻi residents has been the U.S. military’s use of large areas of trust land and its misuse of the land. In August 2019, the Hawaiʻi Supreme Court published Ching v. Case, ruling that the state has an affirmative duty to preserve and protect ceded lands. The case involved the state’s lease of approximately 22,900 acres (9,300 ha) to the U.S. military at Pōhakuloa on Hawaiʻi Island. The court concluded that an essential part of the state’s duty is an obligation to reasonably monitor a third party’s use of the property.

Mauna Kea is also part of the corpus of Crown and Government Lands. Some Native Hawaiians continue reiterating that lands were illegally seized, that the United States and State of Hawaiʻi therefore do not have rightful jurisdiction, and have asserted a number of legal claims to this effect.

== See also ==
- Ahupuaʻa
- Great Māhele
- Hawaiian sovereignty movement
- Hawaiian home land
- Kuleana rights
