= Hoʻokupu =

Hawaiian ceremony of gifts and offerings

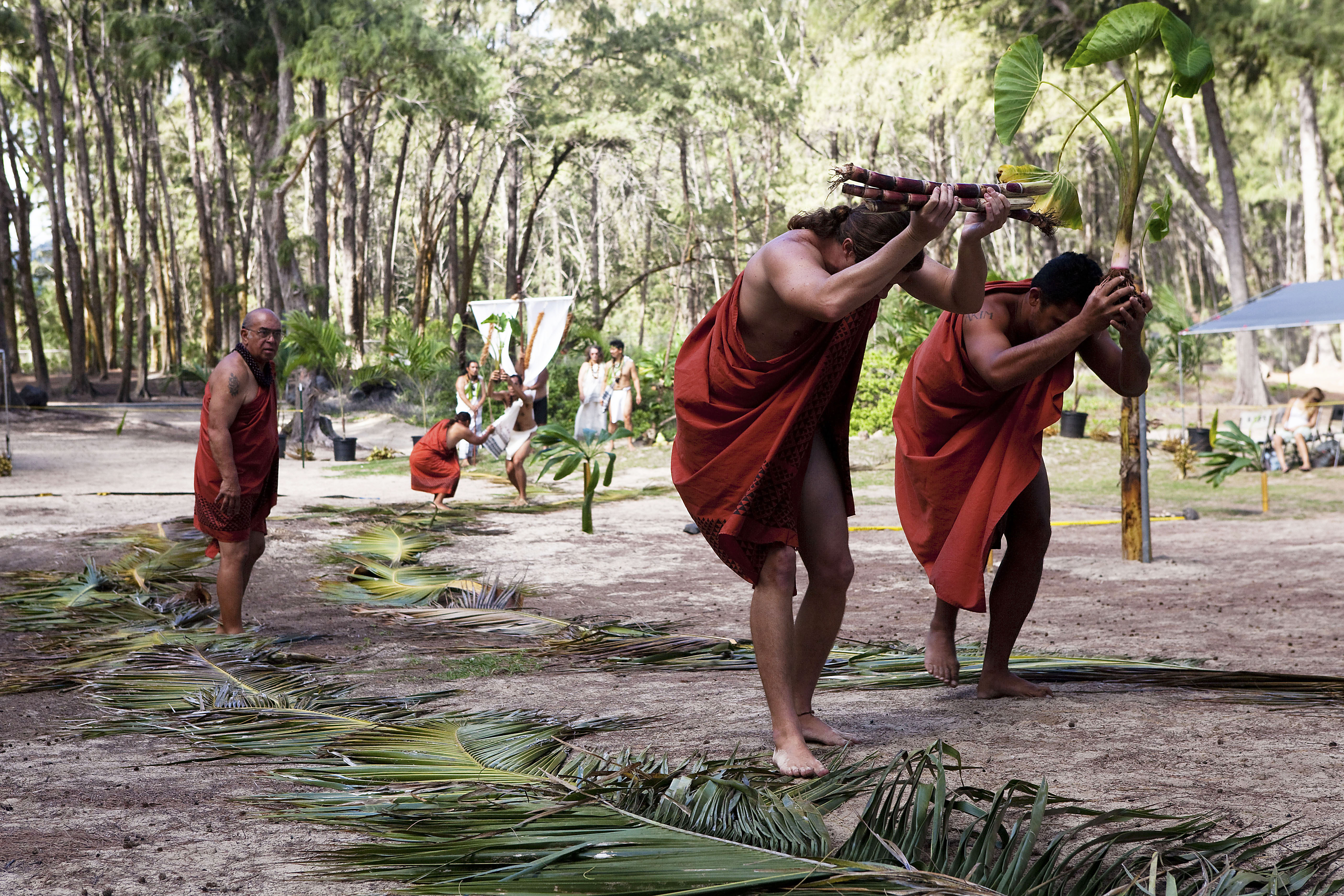
Gifts to the Hawaiian god Lono during the hookupu protocol presentation of a Makahiki festival at Bellows Air Force Station in Waimanalo, Hawaii, 2010

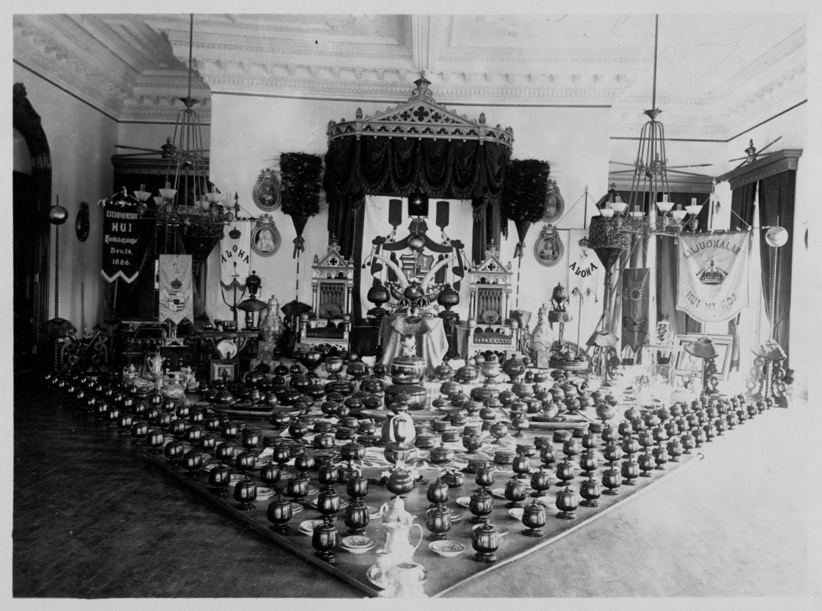
Hoʻokupu (gifts or offerings) presented on King Kalākaua's 50th birthday November 16, 1886 at the ʻIolani Palace Throne Room in Honolulu, Hawai‘i. Consisting of several hundred poi bowls

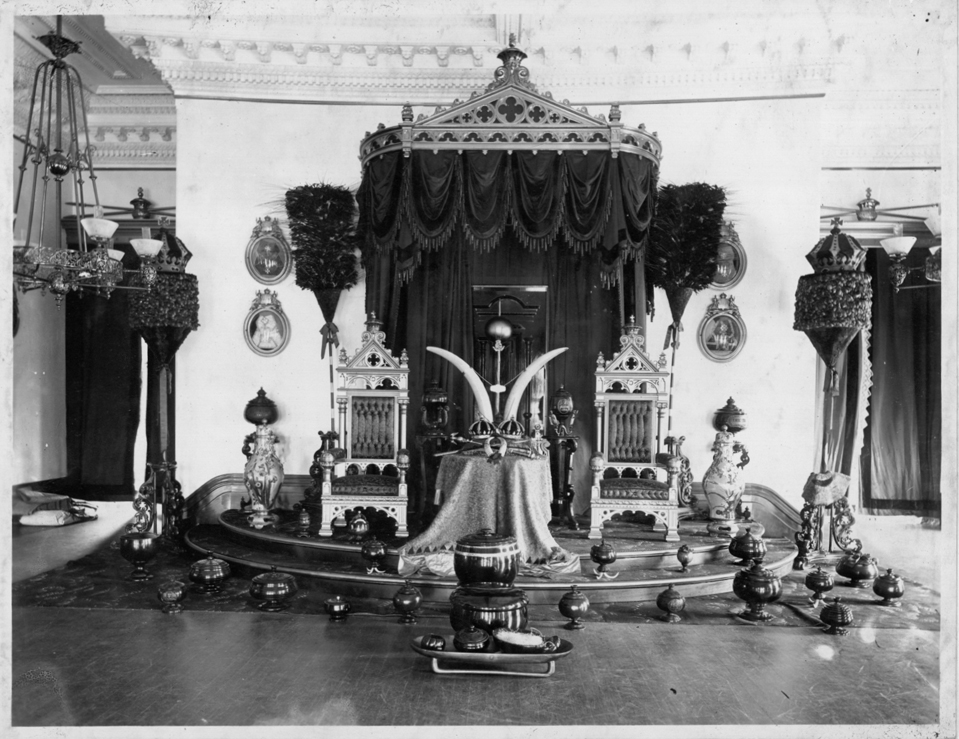
Hoʻokupu presented on King Kalākaua's 50th birthday, ʻIolani Palace Throne Room in Honolulu, Hawai‘i.

Hoʻokupu is a Hawaiian language term for gifts and offerings. The ceremony dates back hundreds of years, to a time when the average Hawaiian subsisted on manual labor, with little-to-no financial assets. Their gifts were literally the fruits of their personal labors to the Hawaiian aliʻi (rulers), or to visiting royalty. Through time, the gifts became more monetary based and a part of the monarch's wealth. Although they were allowed to approach the monarch with the gifts, they were handed to a royal attendant so as not to touch the aliʻi. In 1869, the visiting Duke of Edinburgh Prince Alfred was accorded a hoʻokupu by Kamehameha V, and broke with protocol by reaching out to touch any gift-giver who wished to shake his hand.

The gift protocol is still done for Lono during the Makahiki festival and for celebrations related to Hawaiian kings.
