= Community governance =

Community governance consist of the system of rules, practices and processes by which international bodies, constitutional bodies, statutory bodies, regulatory bodies and autonomous bodies are directed and controlled to achieve proper regulation and development of the world, nation, province, urban area and rural area. To successfully achieve regulation and development, all of the international bodies, constitutional bodies, statutory bodies, regulatory bodies and autonomous bodies are directed and controlled to identify and map the community's assets, capacities, and abilities in order to properly understand a community's strengths and weaknesses i.e. physical, economic, political, social, among others. Through this, it fills the gaps that are created by larger governmental structures and market lags that are not dealt with at state and federal levels. Community governance is a broad term and includes public governance, global governance, governance as a process, governance analytical framework, land governance, regulatory governance, landscape governance, environmental governance, health governance, internet governance, block chain governance, information technology governance, participatory governance, multi level governance, security sector governance, collaborative governance and meta governance.
