= Makahiki =

Ancient Hawaiian season of New Year festival

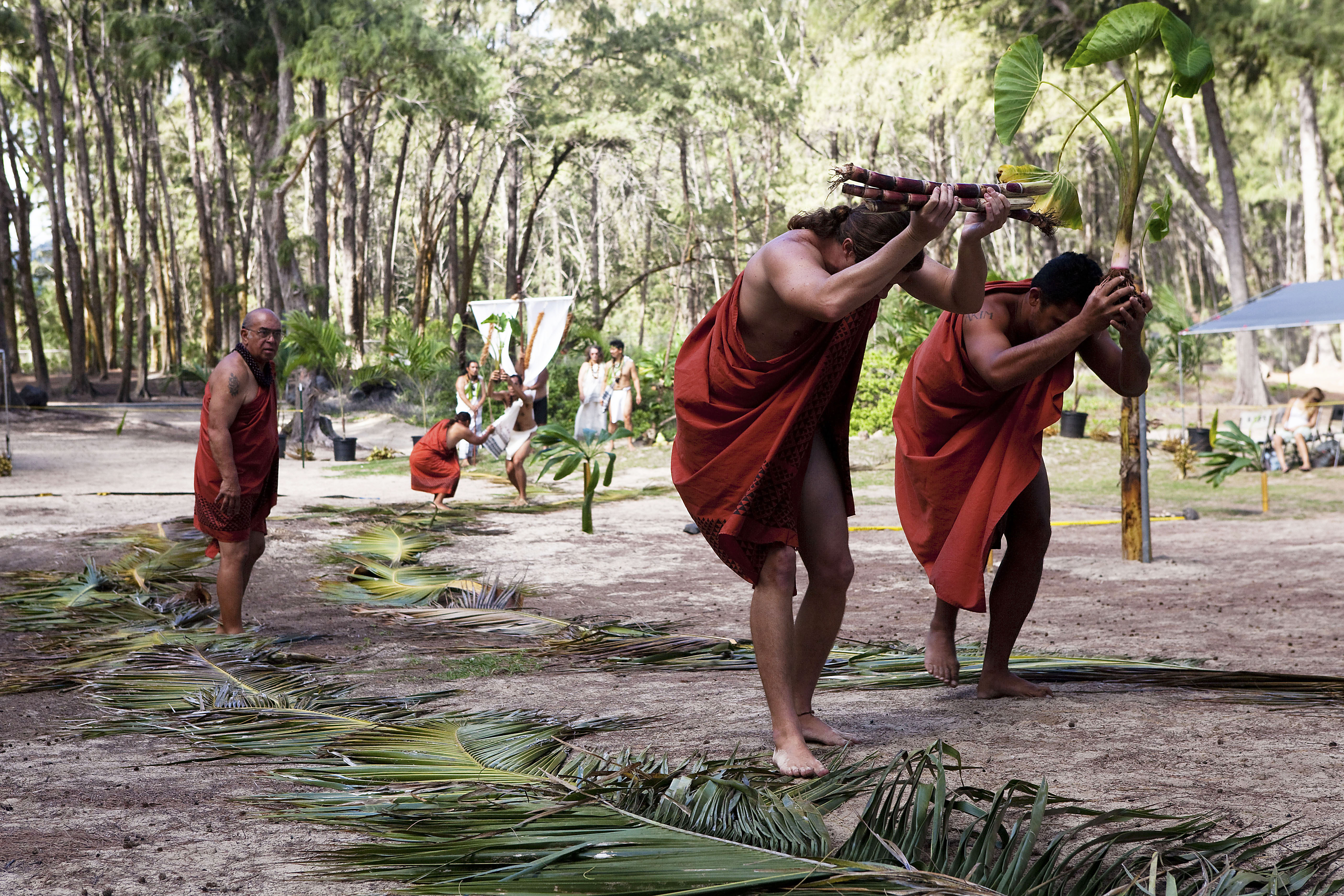
Hoʻokupu gifts to the Hawaiian god Lono during the hookupu protocol presentation of a Makahiki festival at Bellows Air Force Station in Waimanalo, Hawaii, 2010

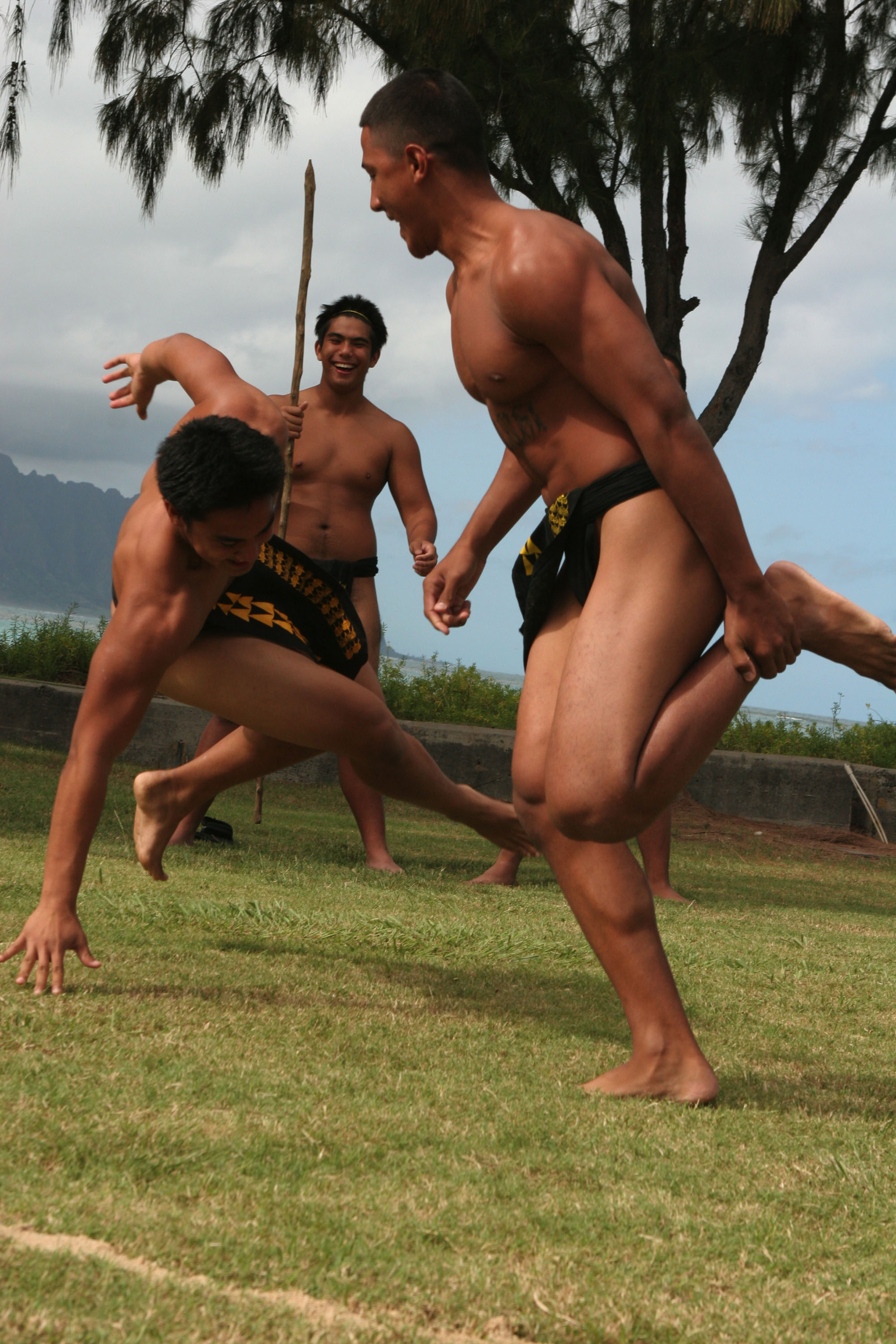
Hawaiian wrestling matches during Makahiki

The Makahiki season is the ancient Hawaiian New Year festival, in honor of the god Lono of the Hawaiian religion.

It lasts four consecutive lunar months, approximately from October/November through February/March. It is a time for men, women and chiefs to rest, strengthen the body, and have feasts of commemoration (ʻahaʻaina hoʻomanaʻo). During Makahiki labor was prohibited and days were marked for resting and feasting. The Hawaiians gave thanks to the god Lono-ika-makahiki for his care. He brought life, blessings, peace and victory to the land. They also prayed for the death of their enemies. Makaʻainana (commoners) prayed that lands of their aliʻi (chief) may be increased, and that their own physical health along with the health of their chiefs be at their fullest.

In antiquity, many religious ceremonies occurred during this festival period. Commoners stopped work, made offerings to the chief or aliʻi, and then spent their time practicing sports, feasting, dancing, and renewing communal bonds. During the Makahiki season warfare was forbidden which was used as "a ritually inscribed means to assure that nothing would adversely affect the new crops".

Today, the Aloha Festivals (originally Aloha Week) celebrate the Makahiki tradition.

== Festivities ==
The Makahiki festival was celebrated in three phases:

=== Hoʻokupu ===
Hoʻokupu was a time of spiritual cleansing and making offerings to the gods (Hoʻokupu). The Konohiki, a class of chiefs who managed land, acted as tax collector, collected agricultural and aquacultural products such as pigs, taro, sweet potatoes, dry fish, kapa and mats. Some offerings were in the form of forest products such as feathers. The Hawaiian people had no money or other medium of exchange. These were offered on the altars of Lono at heiau (temples) in each district. Offerings were also made at ahu, stone altars set up at the boundary lines of each ahupuaʻa (ridge-to-reef geographical division).

All war was outlawed to allow unimpeded passage of the image of Lono (Akua Loa, a long pole with a strip of tapa and other embellishments attached). The festival proceeded in a clockwise circle around each island as Akua Loa was carried by the priests. At each ahupuaʻa its caretakers presented hoʻokupu to the image of Lono, a fertility god who caused things to grow and who gave plenty and prosperity. The Akua Loa was adorned with white kapa streamers and the king placed a niho palaoa necklace on the deity. During a specific time the deities had to be put horizontally as a "sign of homage to the king".

=== Celebrations ===
The second phase was a time of celebration: hula dancing, of paʻani kahiko (sports), of singing and of feasting. These contests, such as mokomoko (boxing), heʻe hōlua (sledding), kūkini (foot racing), wrestling, javelin marksmanship, bowling, surfing, waʻa (canoe) races, and swimming. Some of these games were physical sports. Others were played with the mind. Individual contestants were judged and reflected on their family's reputation. One of the best preserved lava sled courses is the Keauhou Holua National Historic Landmark. Kanaka Maoli (native Hawaiians) were passionate about the mental games, which consisted of riddles, recitation of genealogies, proverbs, and knowledge of hidden meanings. Ancestors cherished these games and held them dear to their naʻau. They placed bets on favorites. Some dared to bet their lives. These games are still practiced today to help younger generations to learn about their ancestors.

=== Waʻa ʻauhau ===
Finally the waʻa ʻauhau (tax canoe) — was loaded with hoʻokupu and taken out to sea where it was set adrift as a gift to Lono. At the end of the Makahiki festival, the chief went offshore in a waʻa. When he returned he stepped onshore and a group of warriors threw spears at him. He had to deflect or parry the spears to prove his worthiness to rule.

== Royal births ==
A royal birth during Makahiki was sometimes given the name Lono i ka makahiki.

== Origin ==
The ancient Hawaiians split the year into two seasons. The first was Makahiki. The second lasted eight lunar months where rituals of Kū were practiced. In ʻŌlelo Hawaiʻi (Hawaiian language), Makahiki means "year" as well as the change from harvest time to planting time agricultural season. This probably came from Makaliʻi hiki, the rising of the Pleiades, known in Hawaii as Makaliʻi, which occurred about this time. It may also come from ma Kahiki, meaning roughly "as in Tahiti", since the legend of Lono is associated with voyages to and from Tahiti. Its origins are linked to the "return" of Lono, during one of the early migrations, in the form of a mortal man.

== Timing ==
The beginning of Makahiki generally is fixed each year by astronomical observations. On the Island of Hawaiʻi, when Makaliʻi (Pleiades) star cluster rises shortly after sunset, usually on November 17, the following crescent moon marks the beginning. On Oʻahu, it may begin when Makaliʻi rises above Puʻu o Mahuka Heiau, as seen from Kaena Point, or when the star ʻAʻa (Sirius) appears in conjunction with a particular land form high on a cliff.

== Contact ==
The sails and masts of Captain James Cook's ship resembled Lono's Akua Loa. Cook's vessel arrived at Kealakekua Bay, near a large heiau to Lono during Makahiki in 1778.

== See also ==
- Matariki
- Native Hawaiian cuisine
