= Konohiki =

Hawaiian headman

A konohiki is a headman of a land division or ahupuaʻa of the Kingdom of Hawaii who administered the land ruled by an aliʻi chief.

== Background ==
The lands of the ruling chiefs of Hawaii were divided into radial divisions of land when possible. These divisions were under the control of other smaller chiefs and managed by a steward. Land was divided up in strict adherence to the wishes of the ali‘i nui. The island was called the mokupuni and was split into several moku. The moku (district) parameters ran from the highest mountain top, down to the sea. These divisions were ruled by an aliʻi ʻaimoku who would have been appointed by the ruling chief. Each of these mokus were further split into ahupua'a, named after the dividing boundary altar (Ahu=altar, pua'a=pig) where taxes were collected for each area during the Makahiki. Each ahupua'a was then run by a headman or chief called a Konohiki.

In Keelikolani vs Robinson, the term is also translated as "land agent". In Territory vs Bishop Trust Co. LTD., when the agent was appointed by a chief they were referred to by the title of konohiki. When referring to the titled person as Konohiki, this meant that they were charged with the care of the division of land for the king or nobility the land was awarded to. The term could also be a designated area of land owned privately as compared to being owned by the government. A chief of lands could not lose life tenure on the land even after being discharged from the position, but a head man overseeing the same land has no such right.

Often aliʻi and konohiki are referenced together; however, while most or all konohiki were aliʻi nobility, not all aliʻi were konohiki. The Hawaiian dictionary gives the definition as a headman of a land division, but it is also used in describing fishing rights as well. The term when broken in two parts is as follows: Kono being defined as to entice, or prompt and hiki defined as something that can be done. The konohiki was a relative of the aliʻi and would oversee the coordination of the property, including water rights, land distribution, agricultural use and any maintenance. The Konohiki would also make sure the right amounts of gifts and tributes to the aliʻi were properly made at the right times.

As capitalism was incorporated into the kingdom the konohiki would become the tax collectors, landlords and wardens over the fisheries.
