= Ahupuaʻa =

Traditional Hawaiian subdivision of land

Full map of the ahupuaʻa of Oʻahu

Ahupuaʻa (pronounced [əhupuˈwɐʔə]) is a Hawaiian term for a large traditional socioeconomic, geologic, and climatic subdivision of land. It usually extends from the mountains to the sea and generally includes one or more complete watersheds and marine resources. The predominant traditional system in the eight high islands of the main Hawaiian Islands was based on the ahupuaʻa. Each ahupuaʻa contained a cross section of island resources and they were managed within a complex social system associated with each area. The general belief is that each ahupuaʻa met the needs of the local population, with excess for tribute and trade.

== History ==
Map of the moku of Maui

Closer view of the ahupuaʻa of Oʻahu's south and east side

The traditional subdivision system has four hierarchical levels:

- Mokupuni (whole island — main islands except Kahoʻolawe):
  - Hawaiʻi
  - Kauaʻi
  - Lānaʻi
  - Maui (with Kahoʻolawe)
  - Molokaʻi
  - Niʻihau
  - Oʻahu
- Moku (largest subdivisions of an island)
  - Oʻahu had six Moku: Honolulu/Kona, Koʻolau Loa, Koʻolau Poko, Wahiawa, Waiʻanae, and ʻEwa.
  - Maui had 12 Moku, the most of any of the islands
- Ahupuaʻa
- ʻIli (two or three per ahupuaʻa, but Kahoʻolawe, for example, had eight ʻili)

Some oral history relates that ʻUmi-a-Līloa, son of the great High Chief Līloa, took control of the land and divided it into ahupuaʻa. However, there is also a general belief that the natural organization of communities along stream systems is the foundation for the system, whose community governance system of Kānāwai is often attributed specifically to shared water usage.

The Hawaiians maintained an agricultural system that contained two major classes: irrigated and rain-fed systems. In the irrigated systems, the Hawaiians grew mostly taro (kalo), and in the rain-fed systems, they grew mostly ʻuala (sweet potatoes), yams, and dryland taro in addition to other small crops. This dry-land cultivation was also known as the mala. It also consisted of (kalo) taro, (niu) coconuts, (ʻulu) breadfruit, (maiʻa) bananas, and (kō) sugar cane. The kukui tree was sometimes used as a shade to protect the mala from the sun. Each crop was placed in an area that was most suitable to its needs.

Hawaiians raised dogs, chickens, and pigs that were domesticated. They also made use of personal gardens at their own houses. Water was a very important part of Hawaiian life; it was used not only for fishing, bathing, drinking, and gardening, but also for aquaculture systems in the rivers and at the shore's edge.

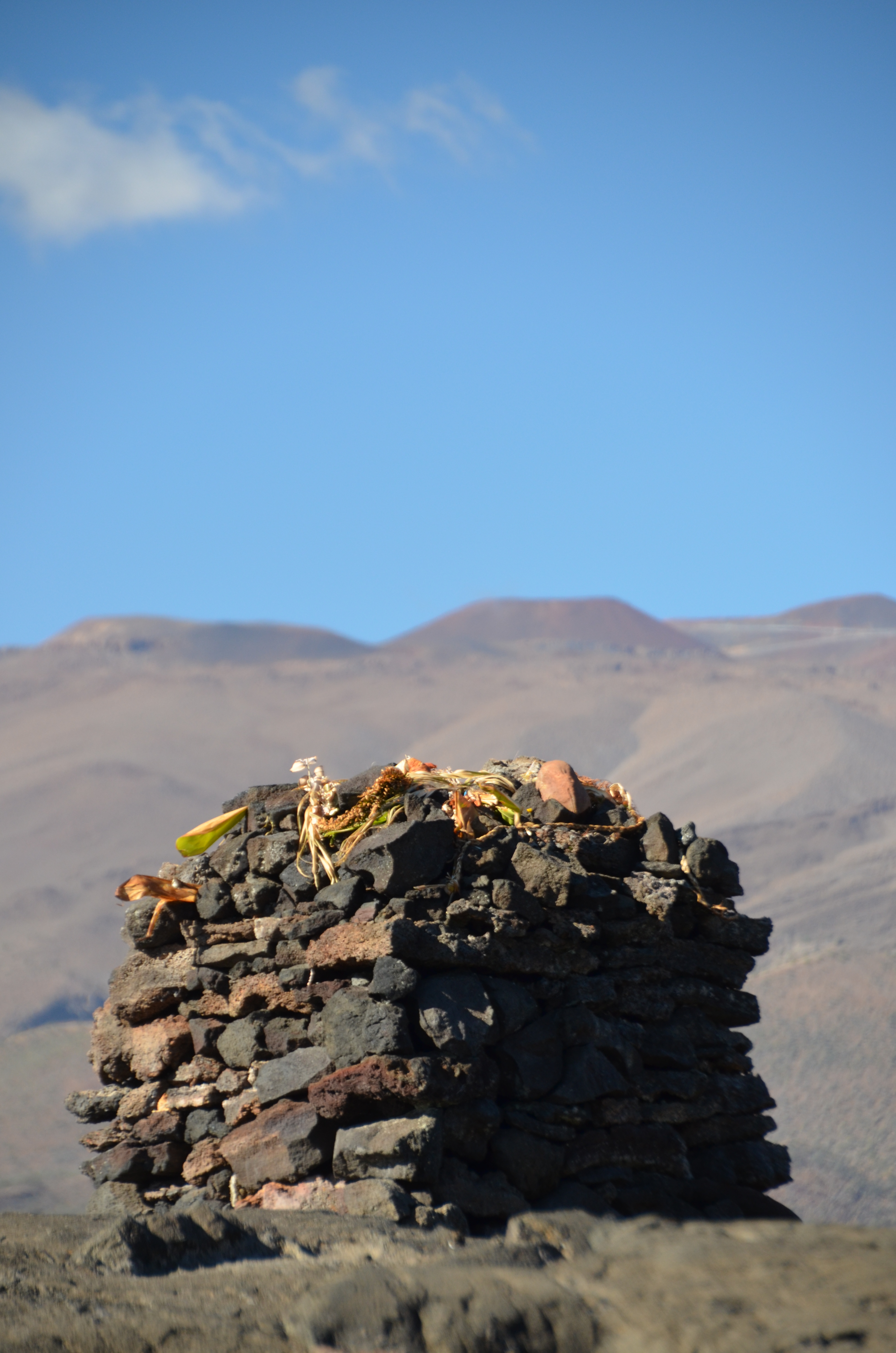
Boundary marker of an ahupuaʻa

The ahupuaʻa consisted most frequently of a slice of an island that went from the top of the local mountain (volcano) to the shore, often following the boundary of a stream drainage. Each ahupuaʻa included a lowland mala (cultivated area) and upland forested region. Ahupuaʻa varied in size depending on the economic means of the location and political divisions of the area. “As the native Hawaiians used the resources within their ahupuaʻa, they practiced aloha (respect), laulima (cooperation), and mālama (stewardship) which resulted in a desirable pono (balance).” The Hawaiians believed that the land, the sea, the clouds and all of nature had a certain interconnectedness, which is why they used all of the resources around them to reach the desired balance in life. Sustainability was maintained by the konohiki and kahuna—priests, who restricted the fishing of certain species during specific seasons. They also regulated the gathering of plants. Ahupuaʻa is derived from Hawaiian language ahu, meaning “heap” or “cairn,” and puaʻa, pig. The boundary markers for ahupuaʻa were traditionally heaps of stones used to place offerings, often a pig, to the island chief.

Each ahupuaʻa was divided into smaller sections called ʻili, and the ʻili were divided into kuleana. These were plots of land that were cultivated by the common people. These people paid weekly labor taxes to the land overseer. These taxes went to support the chief.

There may have been two reasons for this kind of subdivision:

- travel: in many areas of Hawaiʻi, it is easier to travel up- and downstream than from stream valley to stream valley
- economy: having all climate zones and economic exploitation zones in each land division ensured that each could be self-sufficient for a large portion of its needs.

Each ahupuaʻa was ruled by an aliʻi or local chief and administered by a konohiki.

Rule over an ahupuaʻa was given out by the ruling chief to subordinate members of the aliʻi. On the larger mountains of Maui and Hawaiʻi, smaller ahupuaʻa extended up to about 6,000 to 8,000 feet in elevation, while the higher elevations of an entire district would be included within a single, large ahupuaʻa. These ahupuaʻa, such as Kaʻohe, Keauhou, Kapāpala, Keaʻau, Keʻanae, Puʻu Waʻawaʻa, and Humuʻula, were highly valued both for their size and because they allowed control over items obtainable only from high-elevation areas, such as high-quality stone for tools and ʻuaʻu (Hawaiian petrel) chicks. They were given to high-ranking aliʻi, or often retained by the high chief personally.

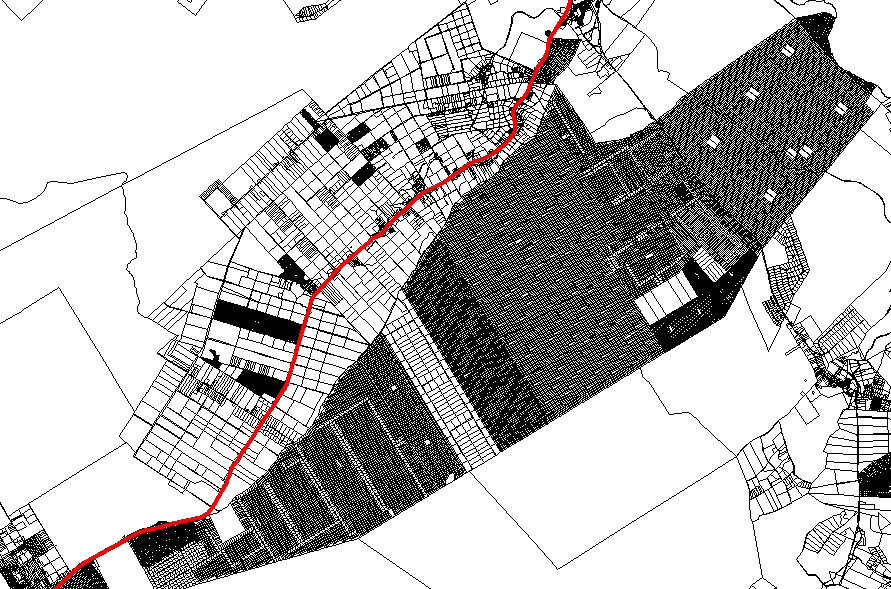
The boundaries of the ahupuaʻa of Keaʻau are easily recognizable by its subdivisions' densely packed land lots.

== Today ==
Following the Great Mahele in 1848, most ahupuaʻa were split up. Manukā, Puʻu Waʻawaʻa, and Puʻu Anahulu on the island of Hawaiʻi are among the few large ahupuaʻa that remained nearly intact under single ownership (with the exception of some kuleana lots) because they were crown lands owned personally by the monarch. In spite of this, the impact of the ahupuaʻa boundaries can be seen in many areas today. For example, the ahupuaʻa of Keaʻau, near Hilo, was purchased as a single unit by the William Herbert Shipman family to farm and raise cattle. Most of the land, however, was eventually sold off to become the large subdivisions of Puna. The line between the large northern lots (sold by the state as 30-50 acre farms) and 1-3 acre southern lots in the vicinity of Kurtistown, Mountain View, and Glenwood is the boundary between the ʻŌlaʻa and Keaʻau ahupuaʻa. This boundary follows the edge of the 200- to 400-year-old ʻAilaʻau lava flow, and the ahupuaʻa of Keaʻau was undoubtedly originally created from the land devastated by this flow.

Many local towns in Hawaiʻi still maintain the names of the old ahupuaʻa. In West Maui, the towns (north to south) Honokōhau, Honolua, Kapalua, Nāpili, Kahana, Honokawai, Kaʻanapali, Lahaina, and Olowalu follow the ahupuaʻa names, with each maintaining their local flavors.
