= List of United States representatives from Hawaii =

The following is an alphabetical list of United States representatives from the state of Hawaii. For chronological tables of members of both houses of the United States Congress from the state (through the present day), see Hawaii's congressional delegations. The list of names should be complete (as of January 3, 2015), but other data may be incomplete. It includes members who have represented both the state and the territory, both past and present.

== Current members ==
Updated January 2025.

- 1st district: Ed Case (D) (2002–2007, since 2019)
- 2nd district: Jill Tokuda (D) (since 2023)

== List of members and delegates ==
Member	Party	Years	District	Residence	Electoral history
Neil Abercrombie	Democratic	September 20, 1986 – January 3, 1987	1st	Honolulu	Elected to finish Heftel's term. Lost renomination.
Neil Abercrombie	Democratic	January 3, 1991 – February 28, 2010	1st	Honolulu	Elected in 1990. Resigned to run for Governor of Hawaii.
Daniel Akaka	Democratic	January 3, 1977 – May 15, 1990	2nd	Honolulu	Elected in 1976. Resigned when appointed U.S. Senator.
Henry Alexander Baldwin	Republican	March 25, 1922 – March 3, 1923	Territory	Paia	Elected to finish Kalanianaʻole's term. Retired.
John A. Burns	Democratic	January 3, 1957 – August 21, 1959	Territory	Honolulu	Elected in 1956. Retired to run for Governor of Hawaii.
Ed Case	Democratic	November 30, 2002 – January 3, 2007	2nd	Honolulu	Elected to finish Mink's term. Retired to run for U.S. Senator.
Ed Case	Democratic	January 3, 2019 – present	1st	Kāneʻohe	Elected in 2018. Incumbent.
Charles Djou	Republican	May 22, 2010 – January 3, 2011	1st	Honolulu	Elected to finish Abercrombie's term. Lost re-election.
Joseph Rider Farrington	Republican	January 3, 1943 – June 19, 1954	Territory	Honolulu	Elected in 1942. Died.
Mary Elizabeth Pruett Farrington	Republican	August 4, 1954 – January 3, 1957	Territory	Honolulu	Elected to finish her husband's term. Lost re-election.
Tulsi Gabbard	Democratic	January 3, 2013 – January 3, 2021	2nd	Honolulu	Elected in 2012. Retired to run for President of the United States.
Thomas Gill	Democratic	January 3, 1963 – January 3, 1965	At-large	Honolulu	Elected in 1962. Retired to retired to run for U.S. Senator.
Colleen Hanabusa	Democratic	January 3, 2011 – January 3, 2015	1st	Honolulu	Elected in 2010. Retired to run for U.S. Senator.
Colleen Hanabusa	Democratic	November 8, 2016 – January 3, 2019	1st	Honolulu	Elected in 2016. Retired to run for Governor of Hawaii.
Cecil Heftel	Democratic	January 3, 1977 – July 11, 1986	1st	Honolulu	Elected in 1976. Resigned to run for Governor of Hawaii.
Mazie Hirono	Democratic	January 3, 2007 – January 3, 2013	2nd	Honolulu	Elected in 2006. Retired to run for U.S. Senator.
Victor S. K. Houston	Republican	March 4, 1927 – March 3, 1933	Territory	Honolulu	Elected in 1926. Lost re-election.
Daniel Inouye	Democratic	August 21, 1959 – January 3, 1963	At-large	Honolulu	Elected in 1959. Retired to run for U.S. Senator.
William Paul Jarrett	Democratic	March 4, 1923 – March 3, 1927	Territory	Honolulu	Elected in 1922. Lost re-election.
Kai Kahele	Democratic	January 3, 2021 – January 3, 2023	2nd	Hilo	Elected in 2020. Retired to run for Governor of Hawaii.
Jonah Kūhiō Kalanianaʻole	Republican	March 4, 1903 – January 7, 1922	Territory	Waikiki	Elected in 1902. Died.
Samuel Wilder King	Republican	January 3, 1935 – January 3, 1943	Territory	Honolulu	Elected in 1934. Retired.
Spark Matsunaga	Democratic	January 3, 1963 – January 3, 1971	At-large	Honolulu	Elected in 1962. Retired to run for U.S. Senator.
Spark Matsunaga	Democratic	January 3, 1971 – January 3, 1977	1st	Honolulu	Elected in 1962. Retired to run for U.S. Senator.
Lincoln Loy McCandless	Democratic	March 4, 1933 – January 3, 1935	Territory	Honolulu	Elected in 1932. Lost re-election.
Patsy Mink	Democratic	January 3, 1965 – January 3, 1971	At-large	Waipahu	Elected in 1964. Retired to run for U.S. Senator.
Patsy Mink	Democratic	January 3, 1971 – January 3, 1977	2nd	Waipahu	Elected in 1964. Retired to run for U.S. Senator.
Patsy Mink	Democratic	September 22, 1990 – September 28, 2002	2nd	Waipahu	Elected to finish Akaka's term. Died.
Pat Saiki	Republican	January 3, 1987 – January 3, 1991	1st	Honolulu	Elected in 1986. Retired to run for U.S. Senator.
Mark Takai	Democratic	January 3, 2015 – July 20, 2016	1st	Aiea	Elected in 2014. Died.
Jill Tokuda	Democratic	January 3, 2023 – present	2nd	Kāneʻohe	Elected in 2022. Incumbent.
Robert William Wilcox	Home Rule	December 15, 1900 – March 3, 1903	Territory	Honolulu	Elected in 1900. Lost re-election.

== In film ==
The life and election of Patsy Mink and her role as co-author of Title IX is highlighted in the documentary film Rise of the Wahine, directed by Dean Kaneshiro.

== See also ==
- Hawaii's congressional delegations
- Hawaii's congressional districts
- List of United States senators from Hawaii
