= Hawaii Territory's at-large congressional district =

Former congressional district

Coordinates: 21°18′41″N 157°47′47″W

- Obsolete district
- Created: 1900, as a non-voting delegate was granted by Congress
- Eliminated: 1959, as a result of statehood
- Years active: 1900–1959

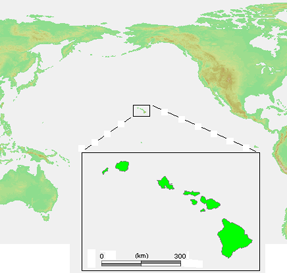
Hawaii Territory, 1898–1959

Hawaii Territory's at-large congressional district was the congressional district for the Territory of Hawaii, which was established by the Newlands Resolution of 1898.

On April 30, 1900, the Hawaiian Organic Act gave the Territory the authority to elect a single non-voting congressional delegate.

After Hawaii's admission to the Union as the 50th state by act of Congress on August 21, 1959, this district was replaced by Hawaii's at-large congressional district.

== List of delegates representing the district ==
Delegate	Party	Years	Cong- ress	Electoral history
District created December 15, 1900
Robert W. Wilcox (Honolulu)	Home Rule	December 15, 1900 – March 3, 1903	56th 57th	Elected in 1900 to finish the term ending 1901. Also elected in 1900 to the next term. Lost re-election.
J. Kūhiō Kalanianaʻole (Waikiki)	Republican	March 4, 1903 – January 7, 1922	58th 59th 60th 61st 62nd 63rd 64th 65th 66th 67th	Elected in 1902. Re-elected in 1904. Re-elected in 1906. Re-elected in 1908. Re-elected in 1910. Re-elected in 1912. Re-elected in 1914. Re-elected in 1916. Re-elected in 1918. Re-elected in 1920. Died.
Vacant		January 7, 1922 – March 25, 1922	67th	
Henry A. Baldwin (Paia)	Republican	March 25, 1922 – March 3, 1923	67th	Elected to finish Kalanianaʻole's term. Retired.
William P. Jarrett (Honolulu)	Democratic	March 4, 1923 – March 3, 1927	68th 69th	Elected in 1922. Re-elected in 1924. Lost re-election.
Victor S. K. Houston (Honolulu)	Republican	March 4, 1927 – March 3, 1933	70th 71st 72nd	Elected in 1926. Re-elected in 1928. Re-elected in 1930. Lost re-election.
Lincoln L. McCandless (Honolulu)	Democratic	March 4, 1933 – January 3, 1935	73rd	Elected in 1932. Lost re-election.
Samuel W. King (Honolulu)	Republican	January 3, 1935 – January 3, 1943	74th 75th 76th 77th	Elected in 1934. Re-elected in 1936. Re-elected in 1938. Re-elected in 1940. Retired.
Joseph R. Farrington (Honolulu)	Republican	January 3, 1943 – June 19, 1954	78th 79th 80th 81st 82nd 83rd	Elected in 1942. Re-elected in 1944. Re-elected in 1946. Re-elected in 1948. Re-elected in 1950. Re-elected in 1952. Died.
Vacant		June 19, 1954 – August 4, 1954	83rd	
Elizabeth P. Farrington (Honolulu)	Republican	August 4, 1954 – January 3, 1957	83rd 84th	Elected to finish her husband's term. Re-elected in 1954. Lost re-election.
John A. Burns (Honolulu)	Democratic	January 3, 1957 – August 21, 1959	85th 86th	Elected in 1956. Re-elected in 1958. Ran for Governor of Hawaii upon statehood.
District eliminated August 21, 1959

== Sources ==
- "Our Campaigns - Container Detail Page". www.ourcampaigns.com.
