= 1902 United States House of Representatives election in Hawaii Territory =

- November 4, 1902
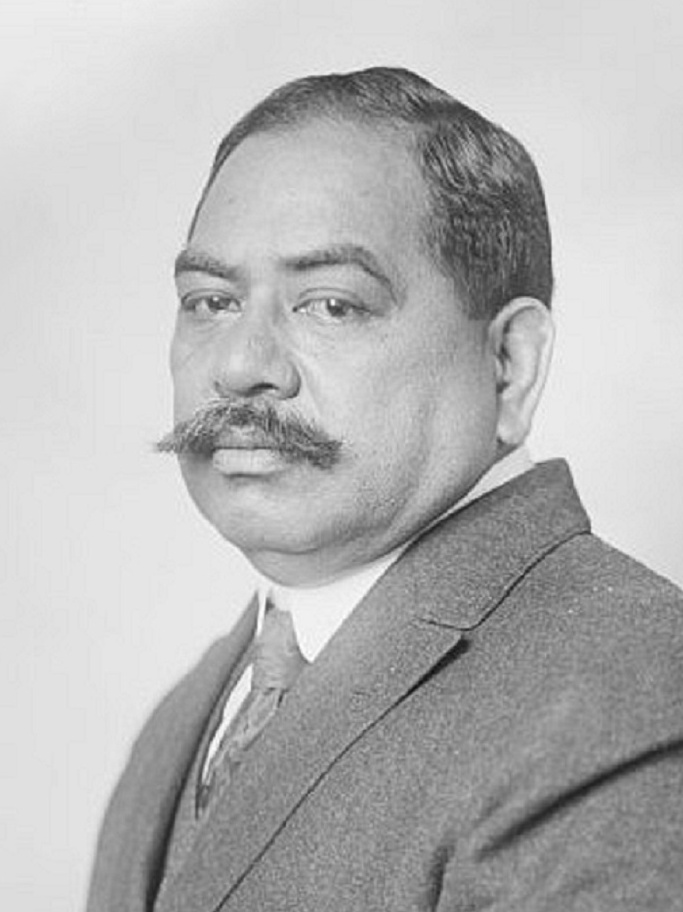

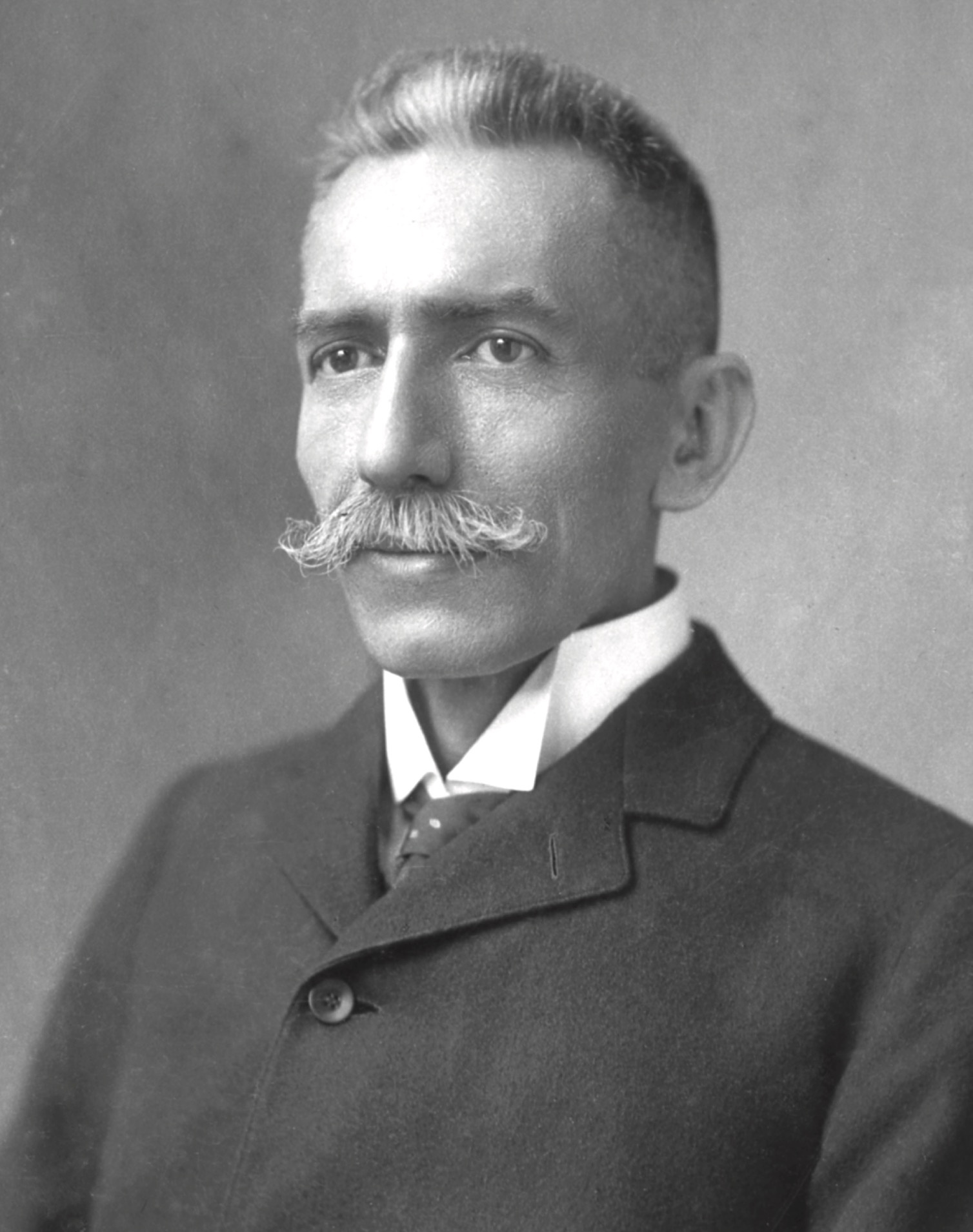
| Nominee | Jonah Kūhiō Kalanianaʻole | Robert William Wilcox |
| Party | Republican | Home Rule |
| Popular vote | 6,628 | 4,698 |
| Percentage | 58.52% | 41.48% |
- County results Kalanianaole: 50–60% 60–70%
Representative before election
Robert William Wilcox
Home Rule
Elected Representative
Jonah Kūhiō Kalanianaʻole
Republican

The 1902 United States House of Representatives election in Hawaii Territory was held on November 4, 1902 to elect the state's non-voting delegate.

Republican Jonah Kūhiō Kalanianaʻole defeated incumbent Robert William Wilcox with 58.5% of the vote.

== Results ==
Hawaii non-voting delegate election, 1902
| Party | Candidate | Votes | % |
|---|---|---|---|
| Republican | Jonah Kūhiō Kalanianaʻole | 6,628 | 58.52 |
| Home Rule Party of Hawaii | Robert William Wilcox (Incumbent) | 4,698 | 41.48 |
| Total votes | | 9,609 | 100.00 |
| Republican gain from Home Rule Party of Hawaii | | | |
