= 1904 United States House of Representatives election in Hawaii Territory =

- November 8, 1904
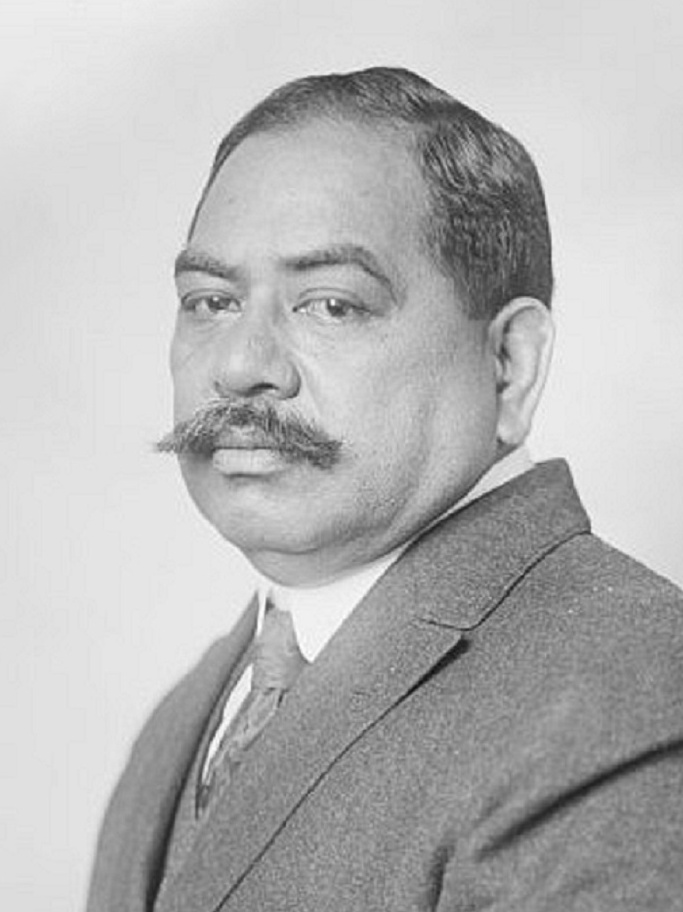

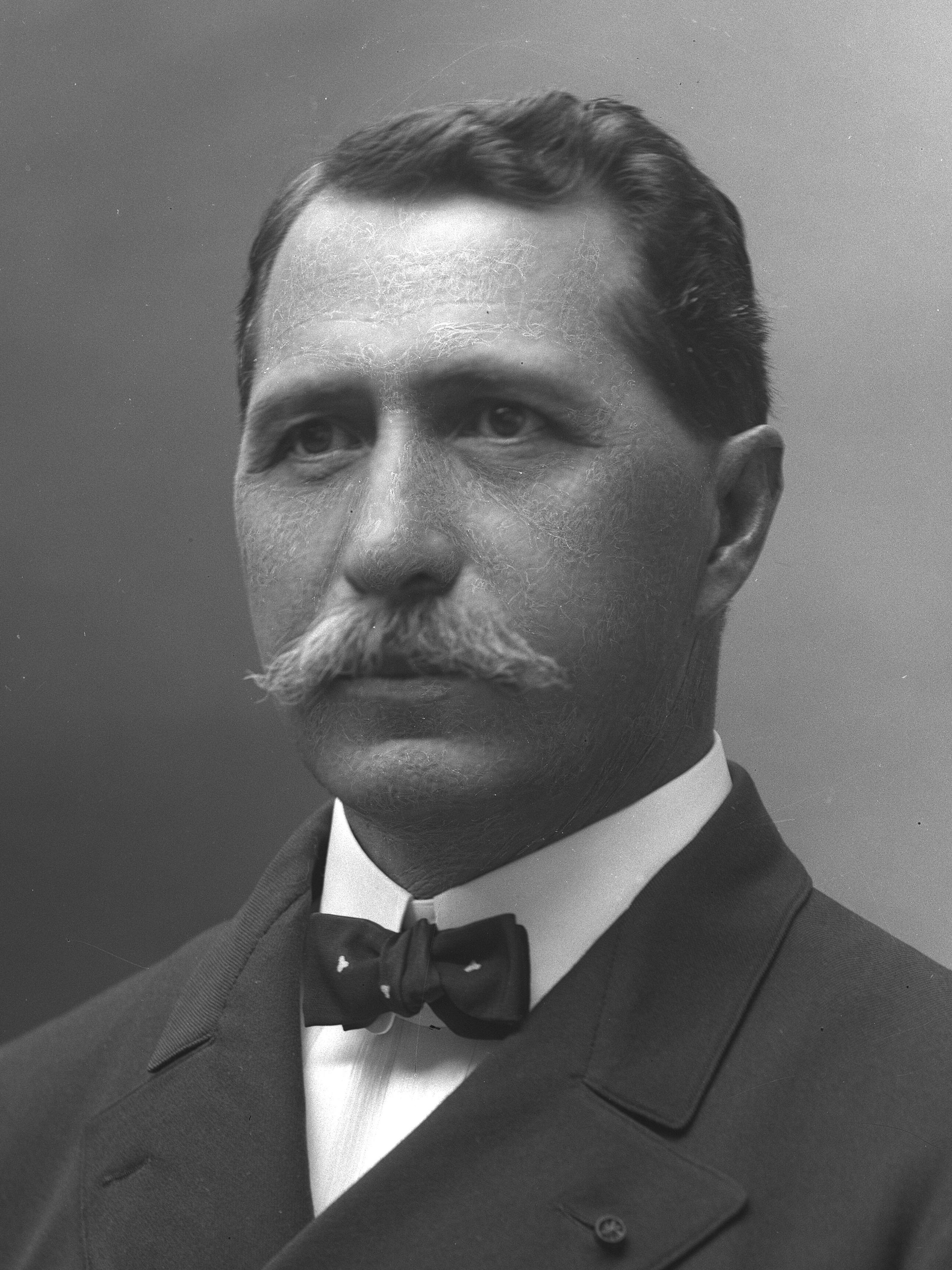

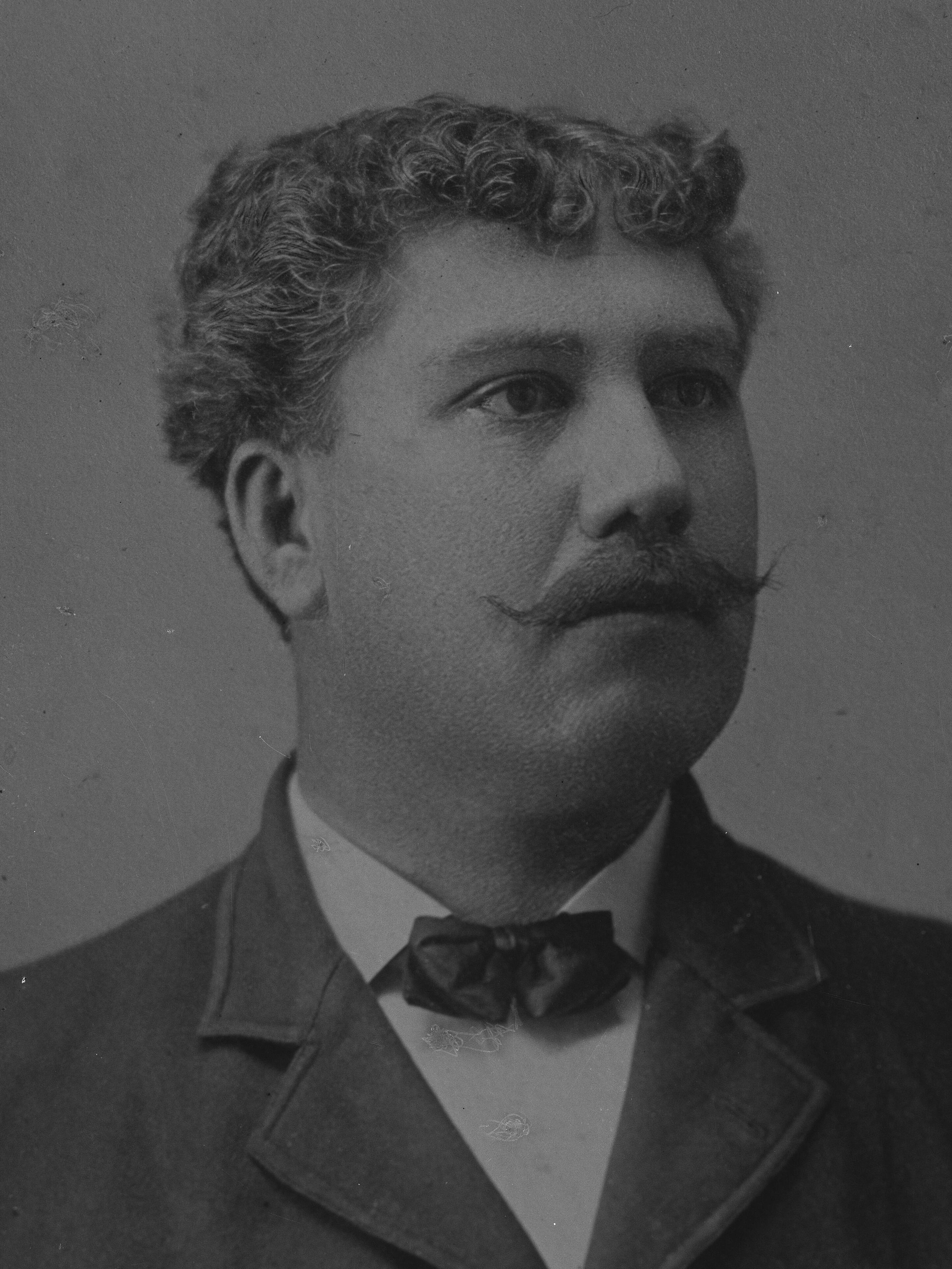
Nominee	Jonah Kūhiō Kalanianaʻole	Curtis P. Iaukea	C. K. Notley
Party	Republican	Democratic	Home Rule
Popular vote	6,833	2,868	2,289
Percentage	56.99%	23.92%	19.09%
- County results Kalanianaole: 50–60%
Representative before election
Jonah Kūhiō Kalanianaʻole
Republican
Elected Representative
Jonah Kūhiō Kalanianaʻole
Republican

The 1904 United States House of Representatives election in Hawaii Territory was held on November 8, 1904 to elect the state's non-voting delegate.

Incumbent Republican won re-election with 56.99% of the vote.

== Results ==
Hawaii non-voting delegate election, 1904
Party	Candidate	Votes	%
Republican	Jonah Kūhiō Kalanianaʻole	6,628	56.99
Democratic	Curtis Iaukea	2,868	23.92
Home Rule Party of Hawaii	C. K. Notley	2,289	19.09
Total votes		11,990	100.00
Republican hold			
