= Wilcox rebellions =

Part of the Hawaiian Rebellions occurring between 1888 and 1895

The Wilcox rebellions were an armed rebellion in 1888, a revolt in 1889, and a counter-revolution in 1895, led by Robert William Wilcox against the promulgation of the Bayonet Constitution in 1888 and 1889, and against the overthrow of the monarchy in 1895. He was considered a royalist and dedicated to the monarchy of the Kingdom of Hawaii. Wilcox's revolts were part of the Hawaiian Rebellions.

== Wilcox rebellion ==
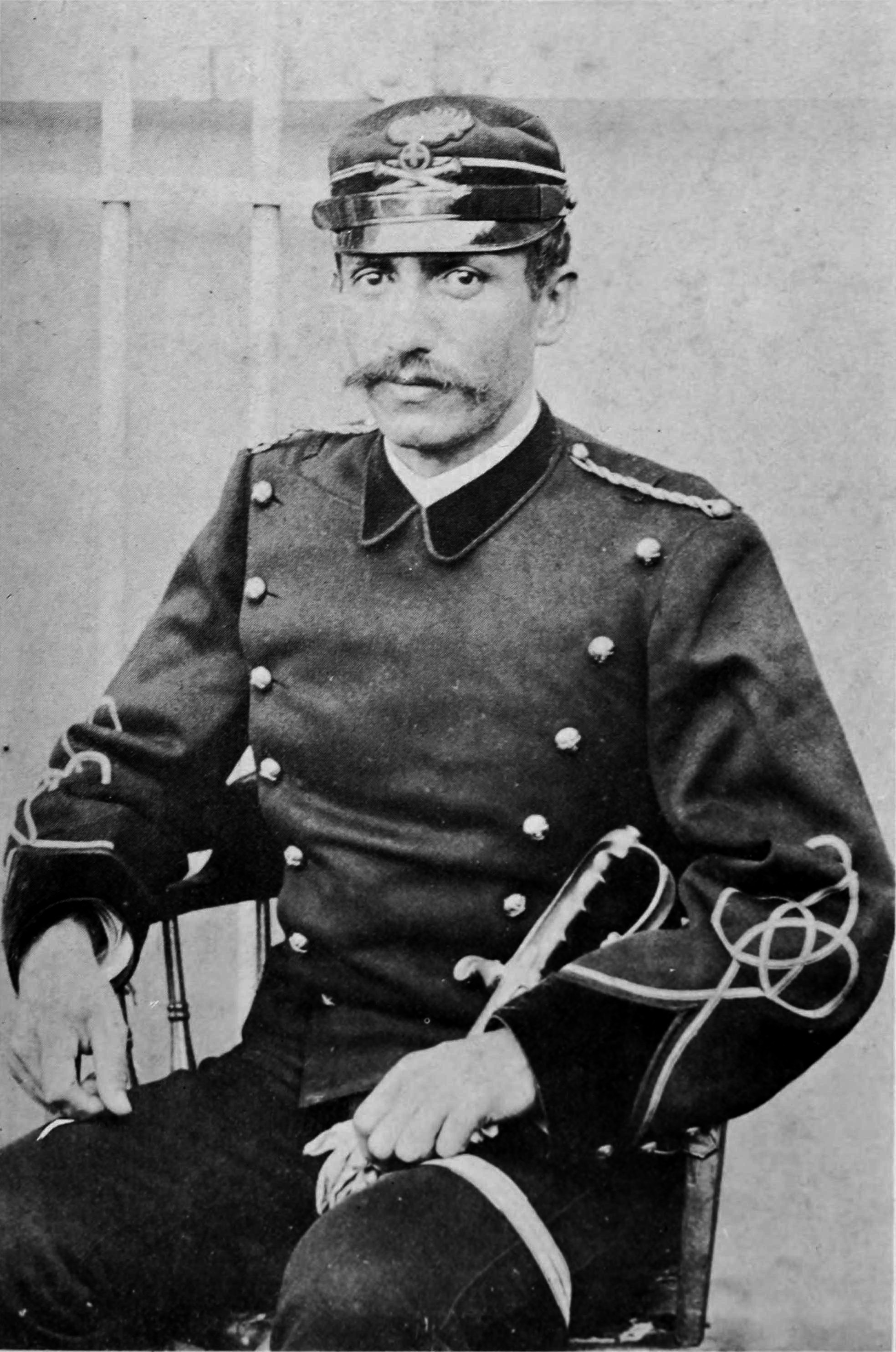
Robert William Wilcox

The plot was to overthrow King David Kalākaua of Hawaii and replace him with his sister in a coup d'état.

=== Background ===
In 1887, in response to increased political tension between the legislature and the king, a group of government ministers led by Interior Minister Lorrin A. Thurston with the support of the Honolulu Rifles, forced King David Kalākaua to promulgate the Bayonet Constitution. The constitution stripped Asians of their voting rights while at the same time limited suffrage to wealthy Native Hawaiians, Americans and other Europeans. The king's own powers were limited substantially. Hostilities grew over the new constitution that limited mostly non-white commoners' rights and power. Kalākaua's sister, Princess Liliʻuokalani and wife, Queen Kapiʻolani returned from Queen Victoria's Golden Jubilee immediately after news reached them in Great Britain.

=== Plot and outcome ===
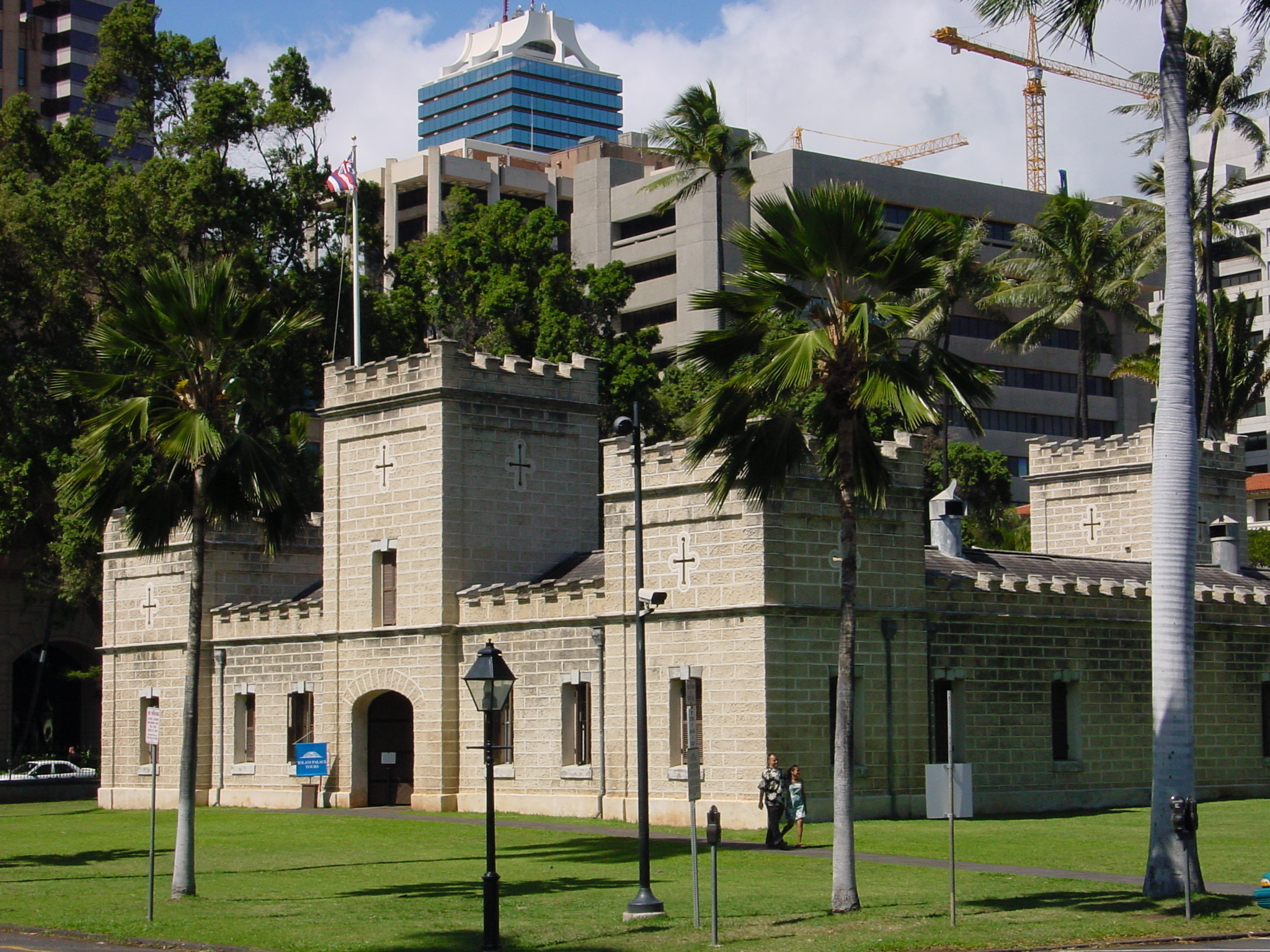
ʻIolani Barracks, 2007

In April 1887, Princess Liliʻuokalani attended the Golden Jubilee of Queen Victoria as part of Kalākaua's delegation. Soon after the Jubilee celebrations, the delegation learned of the Bayonet Constitution that Kalākaua had been forced to sign under the threat of death. A planned tour of Europe was cancelled and the group returned to Hawaii.

Liliʻuokalani felt that her brother, Kalākaua, was not competent to be king. In October 1887 and about the same time as Liliʻuokalani, Kalākaua's distant cousin, a native Hawaiian officer and veteran of the Italian military, Robert William Wilcox returned to Hawaii. Wilcox had returned when the funding for his study program stopped after the new constitution was signed. Wilcox, Charles B. Wilson, Princess Liliʻuokalani, and Sam Nowlein plotted to overthrow King Kalākaua to replace him with his sister, Liliʻuokalani. They had 300 Hawaiian conspirators hidden in Iolani Barracks and an alliance with the Royal Guard, but the plot was accidentally discovered in January 1888, less than 48 hours before the revolt would have been initiated. No one was prosecuted but Wilcox was exiled. So on February 11, 1888, Wilcox left Hawaii for San Francisco, intending to return to Italy with his wife.

=== A second plot ===
Princess Liliʻuokalani was offered the throne several times by the Missionary Party who had forced the Bayonet Constitution on her brother, but she believed she would become a powerless figurehead like her brother and rejected the offers outright.

== Wilcox rebellion of 1889 ==
In 1887, in response to increased political tension between the legislature and the king, a group of government ministers led by Interior Minister Lorrin A. Thurston with the support of an armed militia, forced King David Kalākaua to promulgate the 1887 Constitution of the Kingdom of Hawaii. The constitution stripped Asians of their voting rights while at the same time limited suffrage to wealthy Native Hawaiians, Americans and other Europeans. The king's own powers were limited substantially. A native Hawaiian officer and veteran of the Italian military, Robert William Wilcox, organized a rebellion on July 30, 1889, to revive the powers of the monarch over administration. The rebellion was thwarted by the absence of the King at ʻIolani Palace (who was needed to promulgate a new constitution), and the Honolulu Rifles. Wilcox was tried for treason, and acquitted despite his obvious guilt.

== Burlesque conspiracy ==
The Burlesque Conspiracy is also known as an event called the Sandbag Incident. The name of the conspiracy, Burlesque, was mainly to mock Marshal of the Kingdom Charles Wilson for appearing to have been tricked into putting the Kingdom on a high state of alert for no reason.

=== Background ===
After the rise to power by Queen Liliʻuokalani, members of the National Liberal Party of the Hawaiian Kingdom became frustrated with her over a feeling of neglect to removing the Bayonet Constitution. Wilcox organized another plot in 1892 by forming a group called the Hawaiian Patriotic League which included John Edward Bush, Volney V. Ashford, and J. W. "Bellowing" Bipikane. The intentions of this group were to overthrow the monarchy and establish a republic.

=== Sandbag Incident ===
Wilcox and Bush's speeches drew the attention of Charles Wilson. He had agents infiltrate the group and inform him of the League's activities. In March 1892, Wilson was informed of an imminent coup d'état. In response he put the Kingdom under high alert and sandbagged ʻIolani Palace (hence the name of the incident), effectively diverting the attempt. In response by the League to the Kingdom's lockdown, they aborted the coup and no event occurred. To the public the heightened alertness appeared to have no basis, since no confrontation happened, making Wilson look like a paranoid fool (hence the name of the conspiracy).

=== Aftermath ===
Wilson raided the League on May 20 arresting and jailing more than a dozen conspirators including Wilcox for plotting to overthrow the government. Wilcox spent 36 days in jail and was not convicted, leading to his release. Ministers to the queen felt that the exposing of the conspiracy made it harmless. The conspiracy was received by Liliʻuokalani as one of many voices demanding the removal of the 1887 Constitution, subsequently she drafted the 1893 Constitution.

== 1895 counter-revolution in Hawaii ==
In 1895, Wilcox participated in another attempt, this time to overthrow the Republic of Hawaiʻi and to restore Liliʻuokalani to power. Royalist supporters landed a cargo of arms and ammunition from San Francisco, California, in a secret Honolulu location. At the location on January 6, 1895, a company of royalists met to draft plans to capture the government buildings by surprise. A premature encounter with a squad of police alarmed Honolulu and the plans were abandoned as the royalists were quickly routed. Wilcox spent several days in hiding in the mountains before being captured. The son of one pro-annexationist was killed. Several other skirmishes occurred during the following week resulting in the capture of the leading conspirators and their followers. The government allegedly found arms and ammunition and some potentially evidential documents on the premises of Washington Place, Liliʻuokalani's private residence implicating her in the plot.

== Wilcox's continued resistance ==
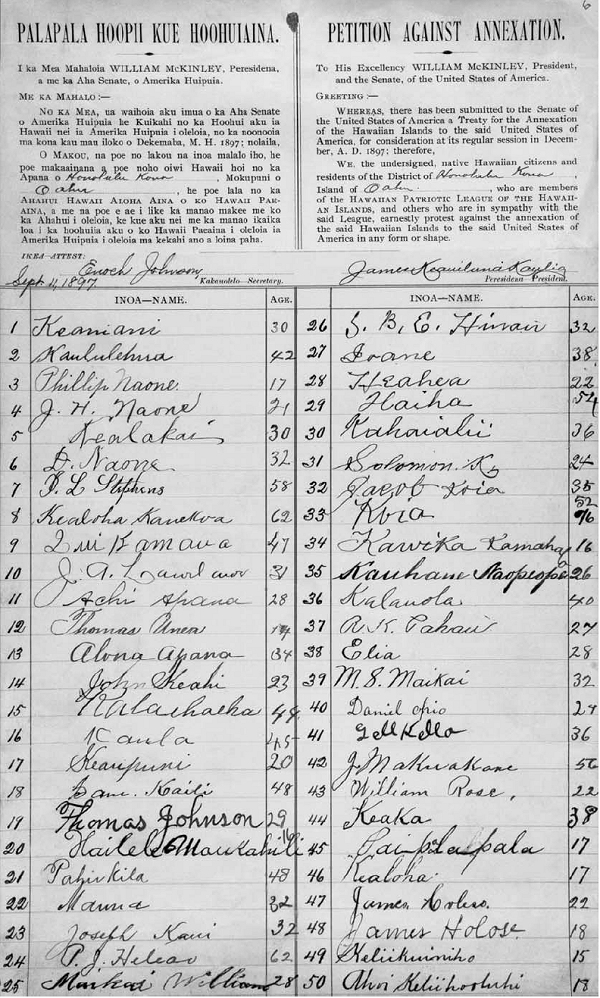
Several pro-royalist groups submitted petitions against annexation in 1898. In 1900 those groups disbanded and formed the Hawaiian Independent Party, under the leadership of Wilcox, the first Congressional representative from the Territory of Hawaii

A few years later, after Wilcox's final rebellion, he organized the Hawaiian Independent Party, later renamed the Home Rule Party, and won the majority of the seats in the Legislature. Wilcox was elected and served in Congress from November 6, 1900, to March 3, 1903, an advocate for Hawaiian rights and sovereignty, and against annexation. But tensions between Governor Sanford B. Dole (with veto power) and the Home Rule Party did not allow legislation to be passed. Wilcox died the same year he left office. Wilcox continues to be regarded as a hero by the Hawaiian sovereignty movement.

== Bibliography ==
Dominis Conspiracy

- Andrade Jr., Ernest (1996). Unconquerable Rebel: Robert W. Wilcox and Hawaiian Politics, 1880–1903. University Press of Colorado. ISBN 0-87081-417-6.
- Liliuokalani (1898). Hawaii's Story. Tothrop, Lee & Shepard Co.
- Foreign Relations of the United States 1894: Affairs in Hawaii. Government Printing Office. 1895.

Burlesque Conspiracy

- Daws, Gavan (1968). Shoal of time: a history of the Hawaiian Islands. University of Hawaii Press. pp. 267–268. ISBN 9780824803247.
- Krauss, Bob (1994). Johnny Wilson: first Hawaiian Democrat. University of Hawaii Press. pp. 36–37.
