= 1906 United States House of Representatives election in Hawaii Territory =

- November 6, 1906
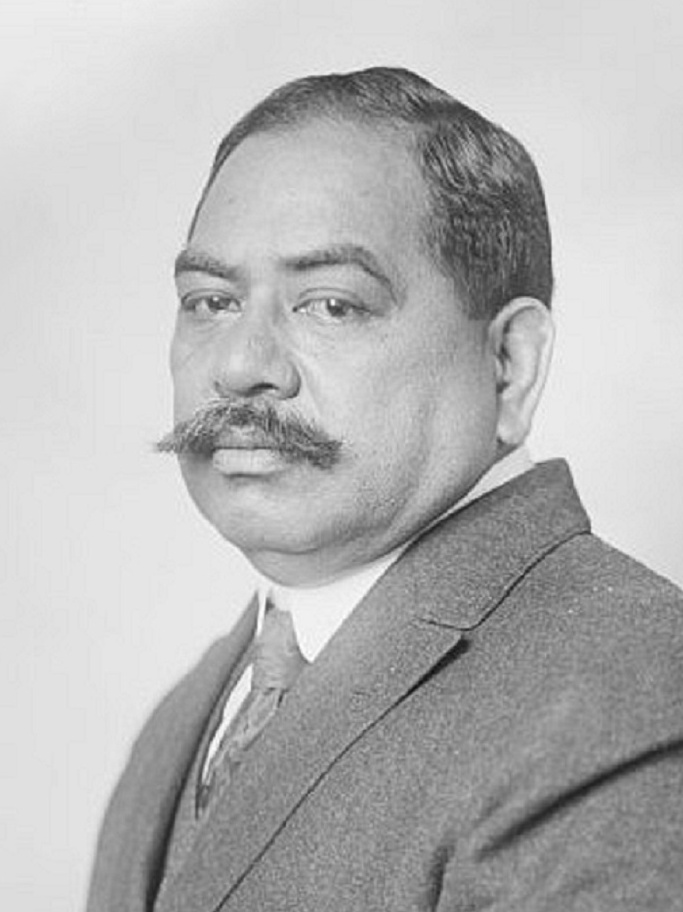

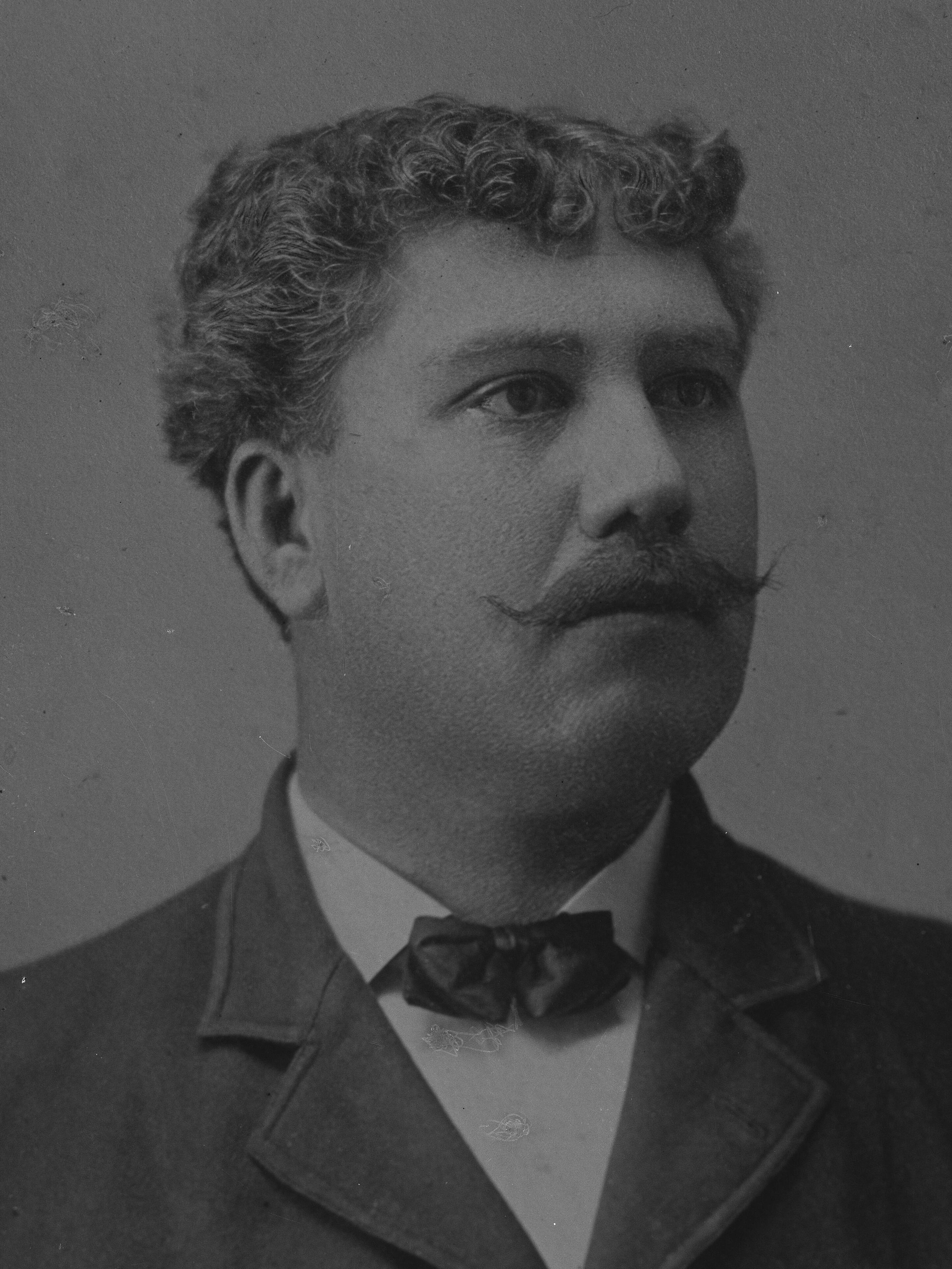
Nominee	Jonah Kūhiō Kalanianaʻole	Edmund B. McClanahan	C. K. Notley
Party	Republican	Democratic	Home Rule
Popular vote	7,366	2,884	2,181
Percentage	59.26%	23.20%	17.55%
- District results Kalanianaole: 50–60% 60–70% 70–80%
Representative before election
Jonah Kūhiō Kalanianaʻole
Republican
Elected Representative
Jonah Kūhiō Kalanianaʻole
Republican

The 1906 United States House of Representatives election in Hawaii Territory was held on November 6, 1906 to elect the state's non-voting delegate.

Incumbent Republican Jonah Kūhiō Kalanianaʻole won re-election with 59.26% of the vote.

== Results ==
Hawaii non-voting delegate election, 1906
Party	Candidate	Votes	%
Republican	Jonah Kūhiō Kalanianaʻole	7,366	59.26
Democratic	Edmund B. McClanahan	2,884	23.20
Home Rule Party of Hawaii	C. K. Notley	2,281	17.55
Total votes		12,430	100.00
Republican hold			
