= 1900 United States House of Representatives election in Hawaii Territory =

- November 6, 1900
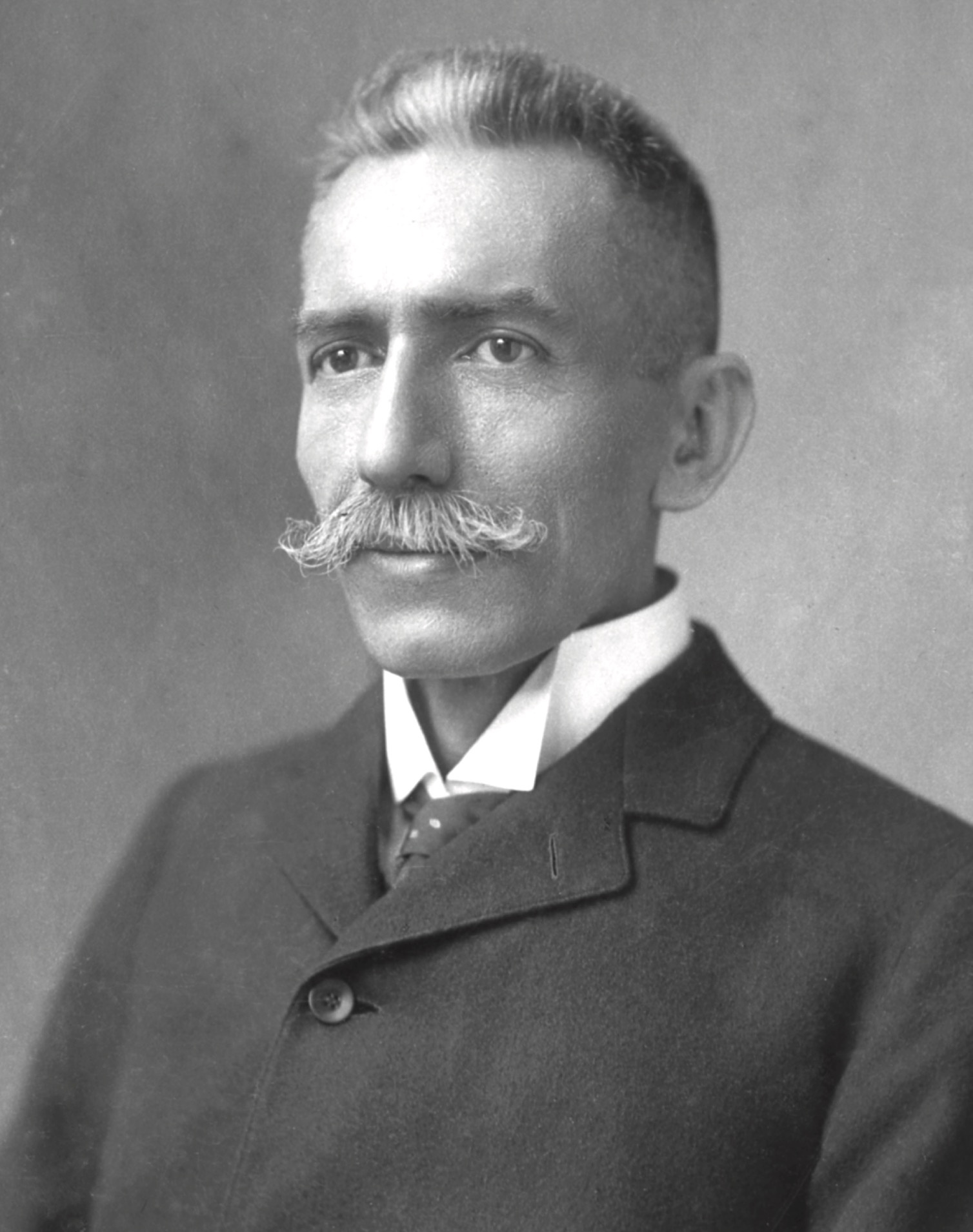

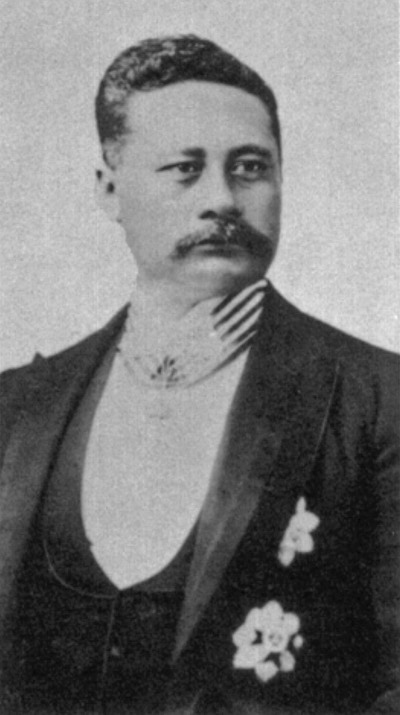

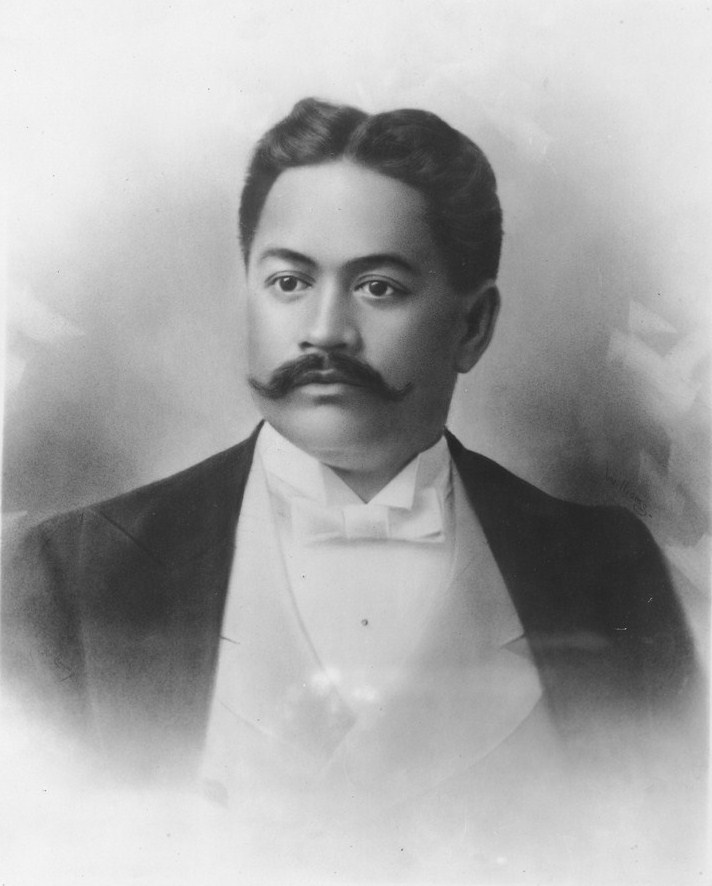
Nominee	Robert William Wilcox	Samuel Parker	David Kawānanakoa
Party	Home Rule	Republican	Democratic
Popular vote	4,108	3,845	1,656
Percentage	42.75%	40.02%	17.23%
- County results Wilcox: 40–50% 50–60% Parker: 40–50%
Elected Representative
Robert William Wilcox
Home Rule

On November 6, 1900 Hawaii elected their first representative.

In 1898 Hawaii was annexed by the United States and became a territory in 1900. Robert William Wilcox won the election over former minister of affairs, Samuel Parker and prince David Kawānanakoa with 42.8% of the vote.

== Results ==
Hawaii non-voting delegate election, 1900
Party	Candidate	Votes	%
Home Rule Party of Hawaii	Robert William Wilcox	4,108	42.75
Republican	Samuel Parker	3,845	40.02
Democratic	David Kawānanakoa	1,656	17.23
Total votes		9,609	100.00
