= Robert William Wilcox =

Hawaiian soldier, revolutionary and politician (1855–1903)

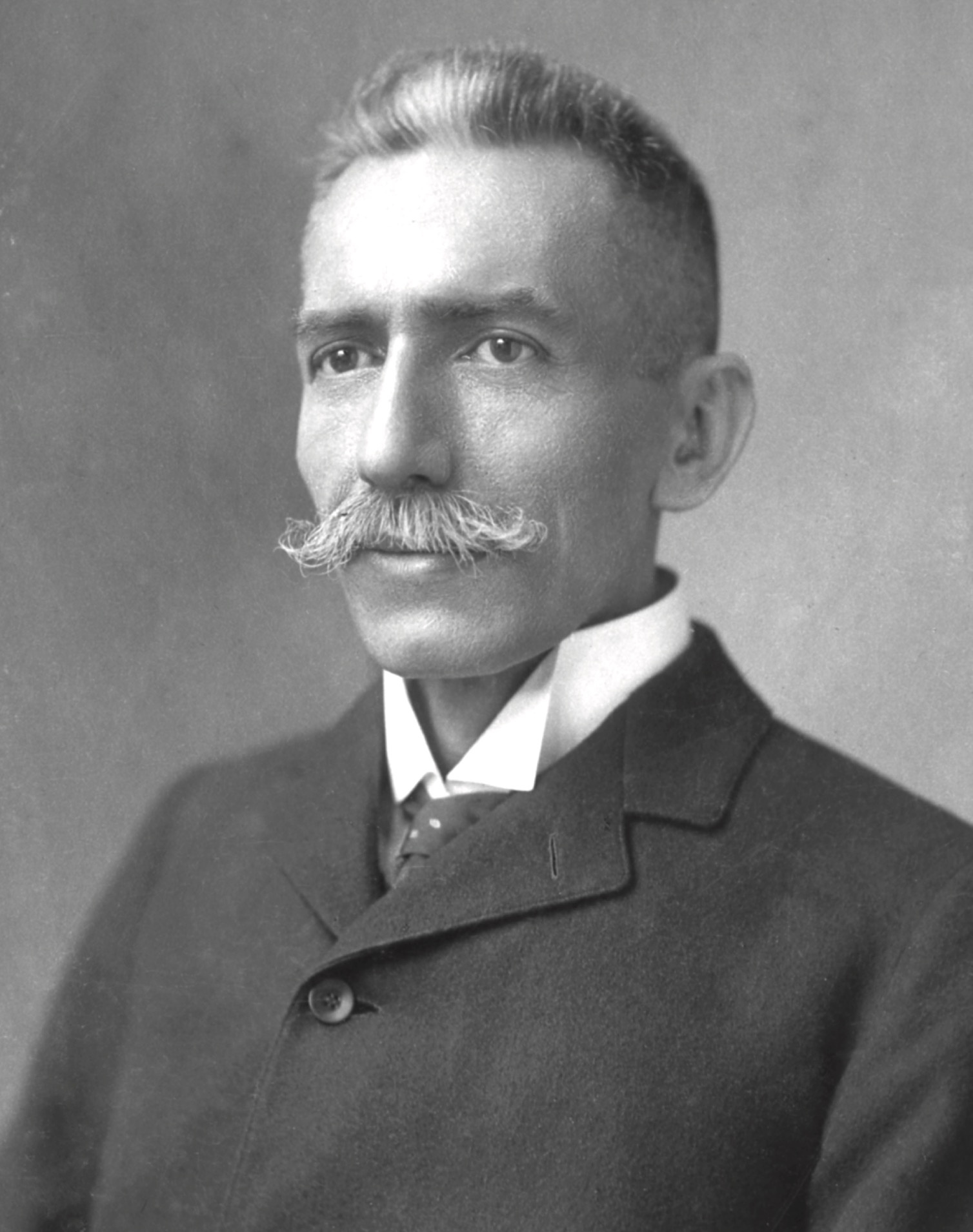

Delegate to the U.S. House of Representatives from Hawaii Territory's at-large congressional district
- In office November 6, 1900 – March 3, 1903
- Preceded by: District established
- Succeeded by: Jonah Kūhiō Kalanianaʻole

Member of the Kingdom of Hawaii House of Representatives for the island of Maui
- In office 1880–1881

Member of the Kingdom of Hawaii House of Representatives for the island of Oahu
- In office 1890–1893

Personal details
- Born: February 15, 1855 Maui, Hawaiian Kingdom
- Died: October 23, 1903 (aged 48) Honolulu, Territory of Hawaii
- Resting place: Honolulu Catholic Cemetery
- Party: Home Rule; Liberal; National Reform
- Spouse(s): Baroness Gina Sobrero (divorced); Princess Theresa Laʻanui
- Children: 5
- Parent(s): William Slocum Wilcox; Kalua Makoleokalani
- Education: Military Academy of Modena
- Occupation: Surveyor

Military service
- Allegiance: Italy; Hawaii
- Branch/service: Royal Italian Army (Italy); Royalist Insurgency (Hawaii)
- Rank: Sub-Lieutenant (Italy); Colonel (Hawaii)
- Battles/wars: Wilcox Rebellion of 1889; Overthrow of the Hawaiian Kingdom; 1895 Counter-Revolution in Hawaii

Robert William Kalanihiapo Wilcox (February 15, 1855 – October 23, 1903), nicknamed the Iron Duke of Hawaiʻi, was a Hawaiian revolutionary soldier and politician, who led uprisings against both the government of the Hawaiian Kingdom under King Kalākaua and the Republic of Hawaii under Sanford Dole, what are now known as the Wilcox rebellions. He was later elected the first delegate to the United States Congress for the Territory of Hawaii.

== Early life ==
Wilcox was born February 15, 1855, on the island of Maui. His father, Captain William Slocum Wilcox (1814–1910) was an American from Newport, Rhode Island. His mother was a Hawaiian from Maui, named Kalua, who was the daughter of Makole and Haupa. Through Kalua's father, Makole, Wilcox was the great-great-great-grandson of the late-17th century Hawaiian king Keaweʻīkekahialiʻiokamoku. Wilcox's grandmother, Haupa, was descended from Umi-a-Liloa of Maui (not to be confused with the king of Hawaii Island) and Lonomakaihonua.

He attended Haleakala Boarding School in the town of Makawao. Upon completion of his studies, Wilcox became a teacher at a Maui country school. In 1880, Wilcox was elected to the royal legislature in Honolulu as a member of the House of Representatives, on the island of Oʻahu. He represented the citizens of Wailuku and its neighboring Maui towns.

== Military career ==
In 1881, King David Kalākaua selected Wilcox and two other part-Hawaiian young men to study at the Royal Military Academy at Turin in the Kingdom of Italy as a part of the Education of Hawaiian Youths Abroad program. By the time he completed his training in 1885, he achieved the rank of sublieutenant of artillery. Impressed with his military skills, Italian officials sent Wilcox to the Royal Application School for Engineer and Artillery Officers.

=== Planned rebellion of 1888 ===
In 1888, the Reform Party (which later became the Hawaii Republican Party) took power in the Hawaiian Kingdom. Through what was called the Bayonet Constitution, they removed most political authority from the monarch, and placed income and property requirements on voters limiting the electorate to only wealthy native Hawaiians, Americans, and Europeans. The Reform Party ended costly programs such as Wilcox's training in Italy. On August 29, 1887, Wilcox received his orders to return home. Returning to Hawaiʻi in October with his wife Gina Sobrero, a baroness closely related to Italy's Colonna family, he began a short-lived career as a surveyor. He had now lost confidence that Kalākaua was strong enough to protect the interests of the Hawaiian people. Wilcox along with Charles Wilson and Sam Nowlein, planned a coup d'état to replace Kalākaua with his sister Liliʻuokalani, but the plot was never executed. On February 11, 1888, Wilcox left Hawaiʻi intending to return to Italy with his wife.

=== Rebellion of 1889 ===
Instead of returning to Italy, Wilcox took up residence in San Francisco, California, and worked as a surveyor while his wife Gina earned extra money teaching French and Italian. When he decided to return to Hawaiʻi in the spring of 1889, Gina refused to go with him, and took their daughter back to Italy.

Wilcox planned and this time executed another attempt to force King Kalākaua to sign a new constitution to replace the 1887 Document on July 30, 1889. Kalākaua, apparently aware of the plot, avoided the palace, afraid that the rebellion would replace him with his sister Liliʻuokalani. Thus stymied, Wilcox was finally confronted by the Honolulu Rifles militia unit. After a pitched battle, Wilcox surrendered. In October 1889, he was tried for treason before judge Albert Francis Judd but acquitted by the jury. Being one of the few leaders to stand up to the conservative royalist Reform Party earned him respect among the people. The American minister John L. Stevens, who called Wilcox a "half breed", wrote: "The trial is tending plainly to show that the Hawaiians are numerously in sympathy with Wilcox." He helped form a new political party called the "National Reform Party" which advocated restoring power to the monarch. Wilcox was again elected to the royal legislature where he served from 1890 to 1893 representing the island of Oahu. However, the conservatives in the original Reform Party, backed by the economic resources of the "Big Five" industrial corporations remained in power.

In 1891, King Kalākaua died and his sister Liliʻuokalani became ruling monarch, swearing to uphold the 1887 Constitution. Wilcox was angered that Queen Liliʻuokalani did not choose him to be in her government, and he then formed his own National Liberal Party in November 1891. Although he did not explicitly advocate ending the Monarchy, the party advocated restoring power to the people even if it meant a republican form of government. After the elections of February 1892, when only 14,000 people were allowed to vote, letters and petitions demanded reforms to the Constitution of the Kingdom. On May 20, 1892, Wilcox and associates were arrested and charged with conspiring to set up a republic. A month later the charges were dropped and he was released.

Back in the Legislature, he backed a measure that would strip power from the cabinet, and by August 1892, the ministers had resigned. Wilcox founded a newspaper called "The Liberal" from September 1892 to April 1893. He edited the section in the Hawaiian language while an English language section had several other editors. The paper attacked the extravagant lifestyle enjoyed by the Royal Family while the common people were suffering the effects of an economic slowdown.

On November 1, 1892, Queen Liliʻuokalani appointed a new cabinet, and two hours later the Legislature (including Wilcox) voted to remove them from office. On November 8, 1892, a new government acceptable to the Legislature was formed. Wilcox no longer directly attacked the Queen, but advocated modernization, and was quoted in the "San Francisco Examiner" that "...we should take some steps to secure commercial and political protection from some foreign country."

By the end of 1892, "The Liberal" expressed support for the Queen. On January 12 another vote of no confidence allowed the Queen to appoint another cabinet of monarchists. On January 14 Liliʻuokalani suspended the Legislature and told the cabinet to sign a new proposed constitution that would restore political power back to her. The cabinet advised against it, and delayed any action. On January 17, 1893, the Committee of Safety, backed by the Honolulu Rifles militia unit took over the palace by force. During this time Wilcox, who was then a politician, was requested by Liliʻuokalani for his previous training in artillery to be put in command of the field pieces of the Royal Guard as they prepared themselves to defend the Queen. Before any shots were fired, Queen Liliʻuokalani surrendered to avoid bloodshed.

=== Rebellion of 1895 ===
Following the overthrow, The Liberal resumed publication January 25, 1893. The English language editor Clarence Ashford supported the Provisional Government of Hawaii, and expressed the view that the Queen had brought about her own downfall. On January 28 the paper argued for becoming a state of the United States, but protested the lack of any native Hawaiians as leaders of the new government. Neither the monarchy nor the provisional government was a representative democracy. Editorials in February proposed becoming part of the state of California, which would enable popular elections.

However, the "Big Five" who dominated the economy wanted to avoid statehood, since as a territory they would not be subject to the American labor laws. They depended on cheap labor for their sugarcane plantations in Hawaii for example. By March 1893 American President Grover Cleveland decided against annexation anyway. The Liberal attacked the efforts of Princess Kaʻiulani when she travelled to America to argue for supporting re-instating the monarchy. Wilcox applied for a position in the new government but was denied. The newspaper shut down on April 15, 1893. Rumors circulated that Wilcox was preparing to proclaim a liberal republic.

The leaders of the overthrow proclaimed their own Republic of Hawaiʻi on July 4, 1894. By the end of the year, royalists were planning a counter-revolution to restore Liliʻuokalani. The key conspirators were Sam Nowlein, head of the Queen's guard, Charles T. Gulick, advisor to both Kalākaua and Liliʻuokalani, and William H. Rickard, a sugar planter of British parentage. They needed a military leader, and approached Wilcox. At first he hesitated, but since he was frustrated with lack of progress on annexation as well as spurned by the republic, he agreed to lead the forces into battle.

Royalist and republican forces clashed at the base of Diamond Head on January 6 and 7, 1895, and in Mōʻiliʻili on January 7. Mānoa was the scene of battle on January 9. Casualties were minor, and only C. L. Carter, a member of a prominent island family, was killed. The royalists were quickly routed and Wilcox spent several days in hiding before being captured. All royalist leaders had been arrested by January 16, when Liliʻuokalani was taken into custody at Washington Place and imprisoned in ʻIolani Palace. Wilcox was arrested and tried for treason. This time he was convicted on February 23, 1895, and was sentenced to death with five other leaders. Some were freed due to giving testimony against the others, and his sentence was commuted to 35 years in prison. On January 1, 1898, he was pardoned by Sanford B. Dole, President of the Republic, who had previously pressured Liliʻuokalani to abdicate in exchange for his life and freedom, as well as for the lives of the others who had been sentenced to death.

== Congress ==
On July 4, 1898, by passing the Newlands Resolution, the United States officially annexed Hawaii, and Republic President Dole appointed provisional Governor. The Hawaiian Organic Act of April 30, 1900, created the office of delegate to Congress for the newly organized Territory of Hawaii. Wilcox organized an election campaign for the office. Helping transform previously anti-annexation native Hawaiian political clubs into the Hawaiian Independent Party (later called the Home Rule Party of Hawaii), he advocated for "Equal rights for the People." Opponents accused him of bigamy since his first marriage in Italy had been annulled only by the Catholic Church. The Republican Party of Hawaii nominated wealthy rancher and former cabinet minister Samuel Parker, and the Democratic Party of Hawaii nominated Prince David Kawānanakoa. Wilcox easily won the election to the 57th United States Congress. He hoped that his seat in the national capital in Washington, D.C. could be used to advocate for native Hawaiians, a community that he feared would be neglected by the American government. Asked to contribute a short autobiography for the Congressional Directory, instead of the usual bland list of credentials, he described himself as "an indefatigable and fearless leader for his countrymen." He called the current government of the Hawaii Territory "the Dole oligarchy." Later versions of his biography removed the editorial remarks.

However, on his arrival, he quickly found himself an outsider. English was his second language, and his populist rhetoric gave him few allies in Congress, which dealt with slow deal-making. His service was also clouded by charges that he did not support the US effort in the Philippines during the Philippine–American War. Wilcox served in Congress for one term, from November 6, 1900, to March 3, 1903.

Although he was also endorsed by the Democratic Party in the 1902 election, he was defeated by Prince Jonah Kūhiō Kalanianaʻole of the Republican Party.

== Family and personal life ==
Wilcox married two noble women. His first wife was an Italian baroness and his second wife a Hawaiian princess. Wilcox's first wife was Baronessa Gina Sobrero, eldest daughter of Baron Lorenzo Sobrero of Piedmont and Princess Vittoria Colonna di Stigliano of Naples. His daughter from his first marriage died shortly after his breakup with Baronessa Gina Sobrero. On August 20, 1896, Wilcox married Theresa Owana Kaʻohelelani Laʻanui (1860–1944), who was descended from a brother of King Kamehameha I. They had a son and a daughter, Robert Kalanikupuapaikalaninui Keōua Wilcox (1893–1934) and Virginia Kahoa Kaʻahumanu Kaihikapumahana (1895–1954). Another daughter Elizabeth Kaʻakaualaninui died young in 1898.

In 1900 Wilcox converted to Roman Catholicism and was baptized.

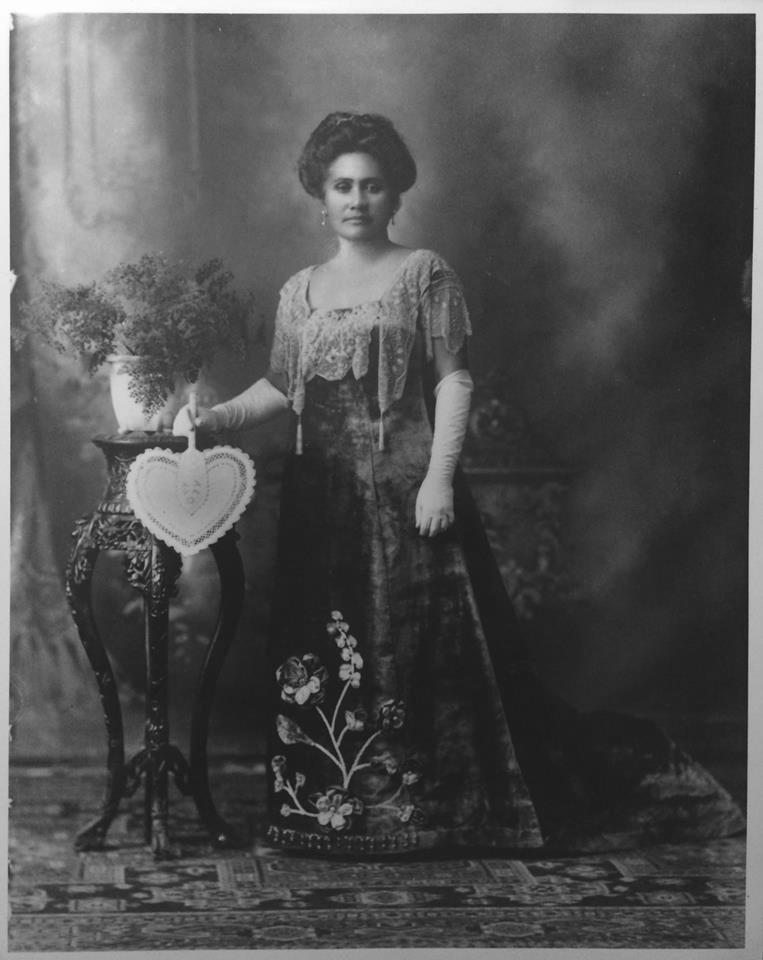
Theresa Laʻanui

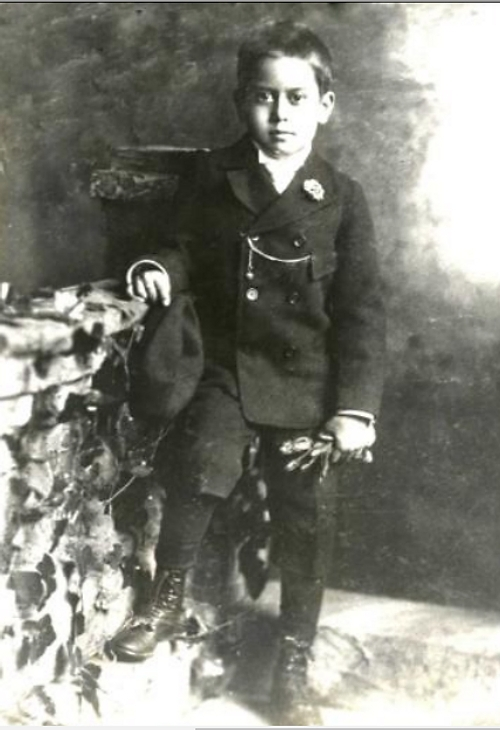
Son Robert Kalanikupuaikalaninui Keōua Wilcox

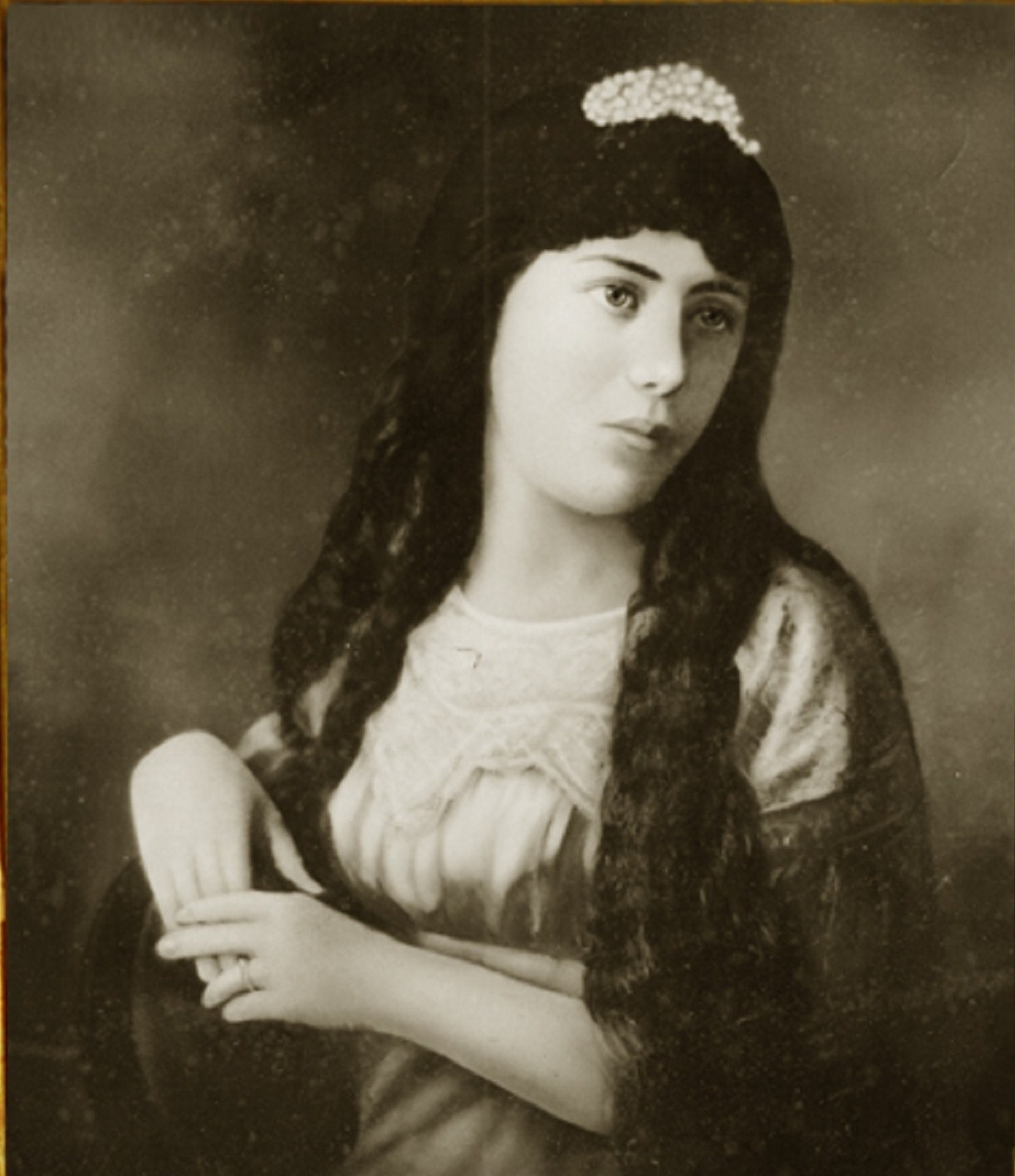
Daughter Virginia Kahoa Kaʻahumanu Kaihikapumahana

== Memorials ==
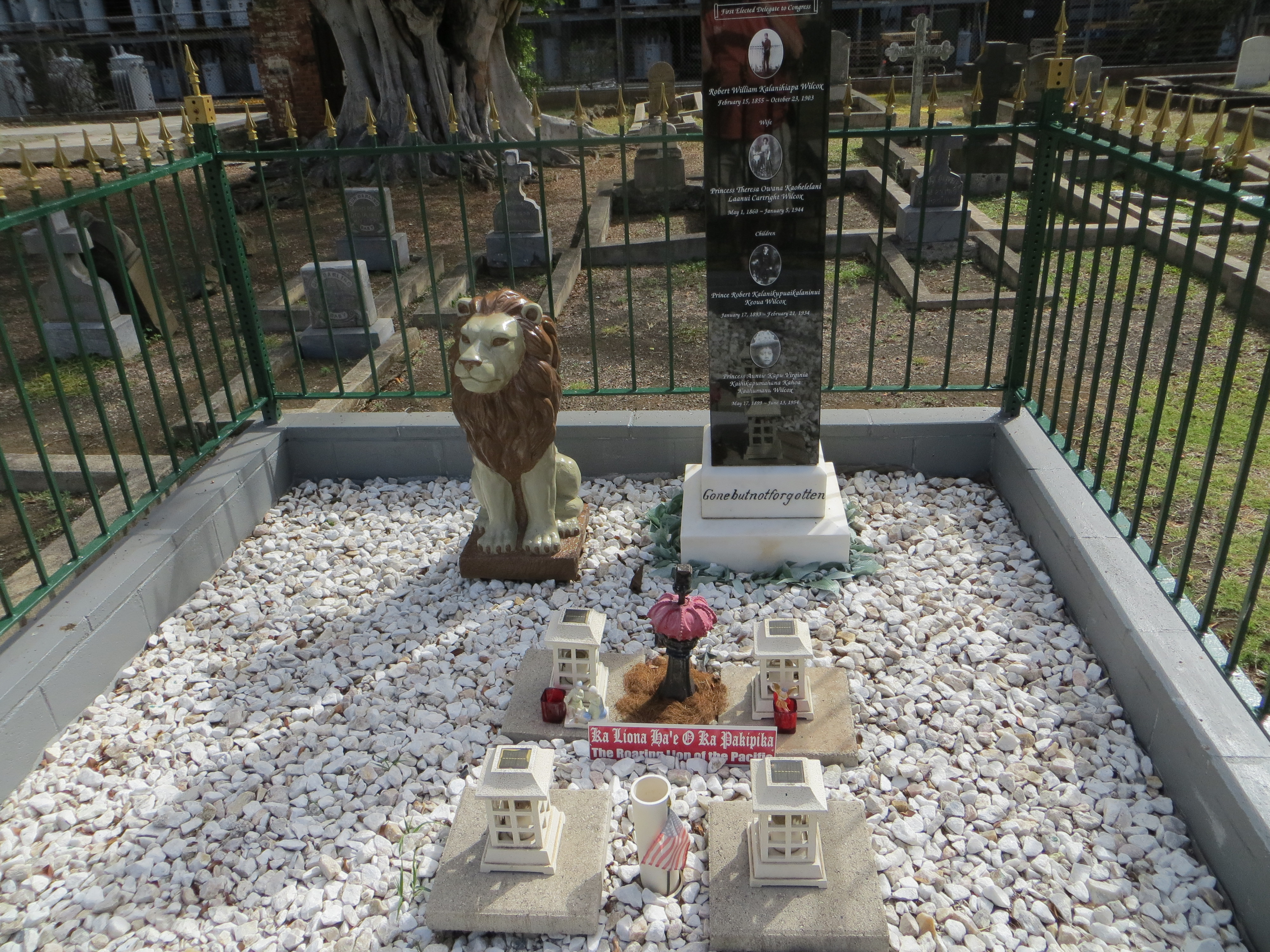
Wilcox's grave at the Honolulu Catholic Cemetery, 2013

The same year he left Congress, Wilcox ran for high sheriff of Honolulu. Wilcox had been in declining health for sometime, while making a campaign speech he suffered a hemorrhage, and died a few days later on October 23, 1903. He was buried at the Honolulu Catholic Cemetery. In 1993, a bronze statue of Wilcox was unveiled at Fort Street Mall, 21°18′32″N 157°51′42″W. The inscription says "He was regarded by many of his countrymen as a national hero". The statue now stands prominently in downtown Honolulu at Wilcox Park, also named in his honor in 1989, at the centennial of the "Wilcox Rebellion".

== Ancestry ==
Laʻanui, Wilcox, Salazar family tree

**Key: Subjects with bold titles and blue bold box = Aliʻi line. Bold title and grey bolded box = Lower ranking Aliʻi line. Bold title and un-bolded box = European nobility. Regular name and box = makaʻāinana or untitled foreign subject**.

**Keōua** (Note: Hawaiian Native Claims Settlement Study Commission, Exhibit B, Genealogy Descent from the Kamehameha Royal Family .)	Kahikikalaokalani	**Kekuʻiapoiwa II**
**Kalokuokamaile**	Kaloiokalani	**Kaʻahumanu**	**Kamehameha I**	**Kalākua Kaheiheimālie**
**Kaohele**	Nuhi	Jean Baptiste Rives	**Holau II**
**Makole (k)**	**Haupa (w)**	**Namahana Piia (w)**	**Gideon Peleioholani Laanui**; 1797–1849 **né Laʻanui**	**Theresa Owana Kaheiheimalie Reeves**
Captain William Slocum Wilcox; 1814–1910	**Kalua**; 1836–1865	**Gideon Kailipalaki Laanui**; 1840–1871	Elizabeth Kamaikaopa	**Elizabeth Kekaʻaniau Laʻanui Pratt**; 1834–1928 **née Elizabeth Kekaʻaniau**
**Gina Sobrero-Wilcox**; 1863-1912 (**née Baroness Gina Sobrero**)	**Robert William Kalanihiapo Wilcox** (February 15, 1855 - October 23, 1903) (Note: Historical Dictionary of the Gilded Age lists Wilcox's full birth and death dating.)	**Theresa Owana Kaʻohelelani Laʻanui**	Alexander Joy Cartwright III	Elmer Miller (Note: Marriage license of Jno K. Kilioe Miller to Virginia K. Wilcox list E.O Miller as father and Makalike as mother of Jno. (Note: "E.O.Miller". Family Search. Territory of Hawaii. Marriage license of Jno Miller to Virginia K. Wilcox - E. O. Miller in entry for Jno. K. Miller and Virginia K. Wilcox, 11 Jun 1916; citing Honolulu, Honolulu, Hawaii, reference 12495B; FHL microfilm 1,711,737))	Makalike
**Robert Kalanikupuapaikalaninui Keōua Wilcox**	Helen Kaleipuanani Simerson Wilburton	John Kilioe Miller; May 26, 1896 - April 20, 1969 (Note: United States World War I Draft Registration Cards, 1917-1918. (Note: "John K. Miller". Family Search. Territory of Hawaii.Draft card - John K Miller, 1917-1918; citing Honolulu City no 1, Hawaii, United States, NARA microfilm publication M1509 (Washington D.C.: National Archives and Records Administration, n.d.); FHL microfilm 1,452,096))	**Virginia Kahoa Kaʻahumanu Kaihikapumahana Wilcox** (Note: Hawaii Marriages, 1826-1922.)	**Elizabeth Kaʻakaualaninui Wilcox**	Daisy Emmalani Napulahaokalani Cartwright	Eva Kuwailanimamao Cartwright
Henry Mario Salazar	**Helena Kalokuokamaile Wilcox Salazar-Machado**; April 13, 1917 – September 17, 1988 (née Wilcox)	Henry Machado, Sr.
**Henry C. Keaweikekahialiiokamoku Salazar**	**Paul C. Kalokuokamaile Salazar**	**Michael Carl Kauhiokalani Salazar**	**Stephen Craig Laanui Salazar**	**Owana Kaohelelani Mahealani-Rose Salazar**

== See also ==
- List of Asian Americans and Pacific Islands Americans in the United States Congress

U.S. House of Representatives
Preceded by First delegate	Delegate to the U.S. House of Representatives from Hawaii's at-large congressional district November 6, 1900 – March 3, 1903	Succeeded by Jonah Kūhiō Kalanianaʻole
