= Jonah Kūhiō Kalanianaʻole =

Hawaiian royalty and Hawaiian politician (1871–1922)

- Prince of Hawaiʻi
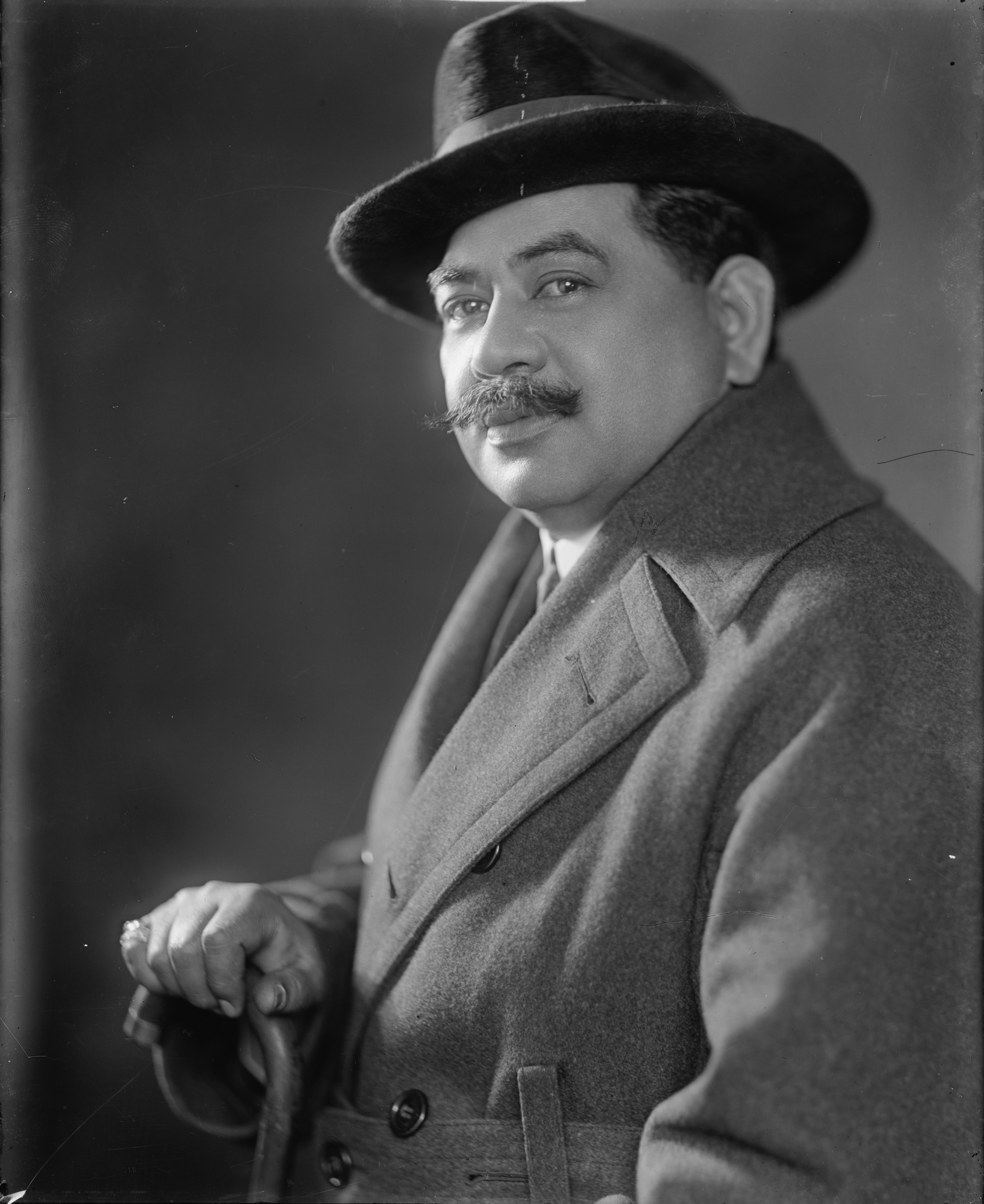
- Born: March 26, 1871; Kukuiʻula, Kōloa, Kauaʻi, Kingdom of Hawaiʻi
- Died: January 7, 1922 (aged 50); Waikīkī, Oʻahu, Territory of Hawaii
- Burial: January 15, 1922; Mauna ʻAla Royal Mausoleum
- Spouse: Elizabeth Kahanu Kalanianaʻole
Names
- Jonah Kūhiō Kalanianaʻole
- House: House of Kalākaua
- Father: David Kahalepouli Piʻikoi; King Kalākaua (hānai)
- Mother: Victoria Kinoiki Kekaulike; Queen Kapiʻolani (hānai)

Delegate to the U.S. House of Representatives from Hawaii Territory's At-large district
- In office March 4, 1903 – January 7, 1922
- Preceded by: Robert W. Wilcox
- Succeeded by: Henry A. Baldwin

Personal details
- Party: Home Rule, Republican

Jonah Kūhiō Kalanianaʻole (March 26, 1871 – January 7, 1922) was a prince of the Kingdom of Hawaiʻi until it was overthrown by a coalition of American and European businessmen in 1893. He went on to become the delegate of the Territory of Hawaii to the United States Congress, and as such is the only royal-born member of Congress.

Kūhiō was often called Ke Aliʻi Makaʻāinana (Prince of the People) and is well known for his efforts to preserve and strengthen the Hawaiian people. His birthday is celebrated as a state holiday in Hawaiʻi.

== Early life ==
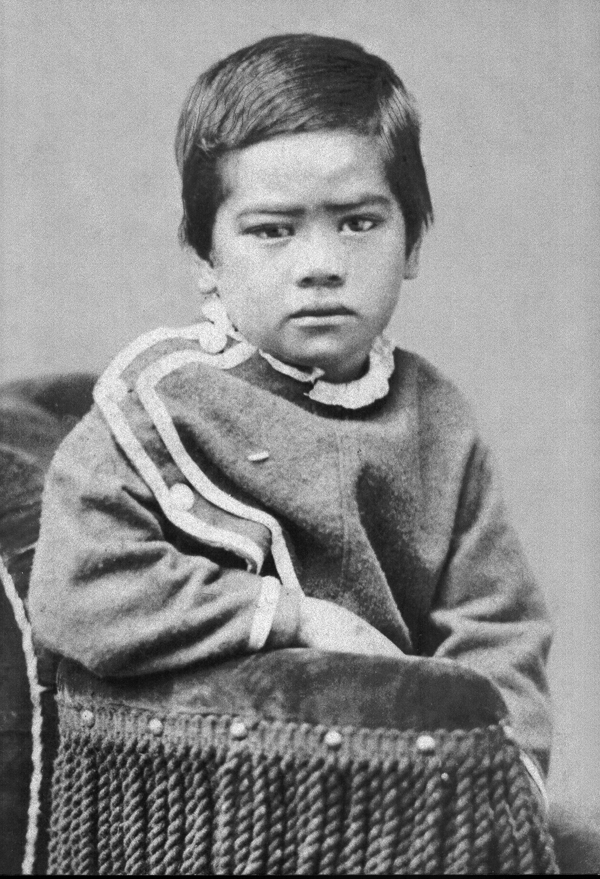
The young Kūhiō

Kalanianaʻole was born March 26, 1871, in Kukuiʻula, Kōloa on the island of Kauaʻi. Like many aliʻi (Hawaiian nobility) his genealogy was complex, but he was an heir of Kaumualiʻi, the last ruling chief of Kauaʻi. He was named after his maternal grandfather Kūhiō Kalanianaʻole, a High Chief of Hilo, and his paternal grandfather Jonah Piʻikoi, a High Chief of Kauaʻi. His Hawaiian name Kuhio translated into "Chief who leaned forward as he stood," and "Kalanianaʻole" meant "ambitious Chief," or "Chief who is never satisfied."

== Education ==
He attended St. Alban's College, now ʻIolani School and Oahu College (now Punahou School), in Honolulu on the island of Oʻahu. In the 1870s, a French school teacher at St. Alban's, commented on how the young man's eyes twinkled merrily and how he kept a perpetual smile. "He is so cute, just like the pictures of the little cupid", teacher Pierre Jones said. The nickname, "Prince Cupid", stuck with Prince Kūhiō for the rest of his life.

After completing his basic education he traveled abroad for further study. His uncle King Kalākaua pushed for future Hawaiian leaders to attain a broader education with his 1880 Hawaiian Youths Abroad program. The Hawaiian government sent Kūhiō and his two brothers Kawānanakoa and Keliʻiahonui to attend Saint Matthew's School in San Mateo, California in 1885. Keliʻiahonui died in 1887 while at home from school.

In 1890, Kūhiō and Kawānanakoa were sent to attend schools in the United Kingdom. This came a year after their cousin Kaʻiulani was also sent to England for school He studied at the Royal Agricultural College in England before graduating from business school in England. He was described as an excellent marksman and athlete at sports such as football and cycling.

== Surfing ==
While attending school in San Mateo, Kūhiō and his brothers surfed the Pacific seashore at Santa Cruz. The brothers demonstrated the Hawaiian sport of board surfing to the locals, becoming the first California surfers in 1885. In September 1890, Kawānanakoa and Kūhiō became the first surfers in the British Isles and taught their English tutor John Wrightson to surf on the beaches of Bridlington in northern England.

== Prince of the Kalākaua dynasty ==
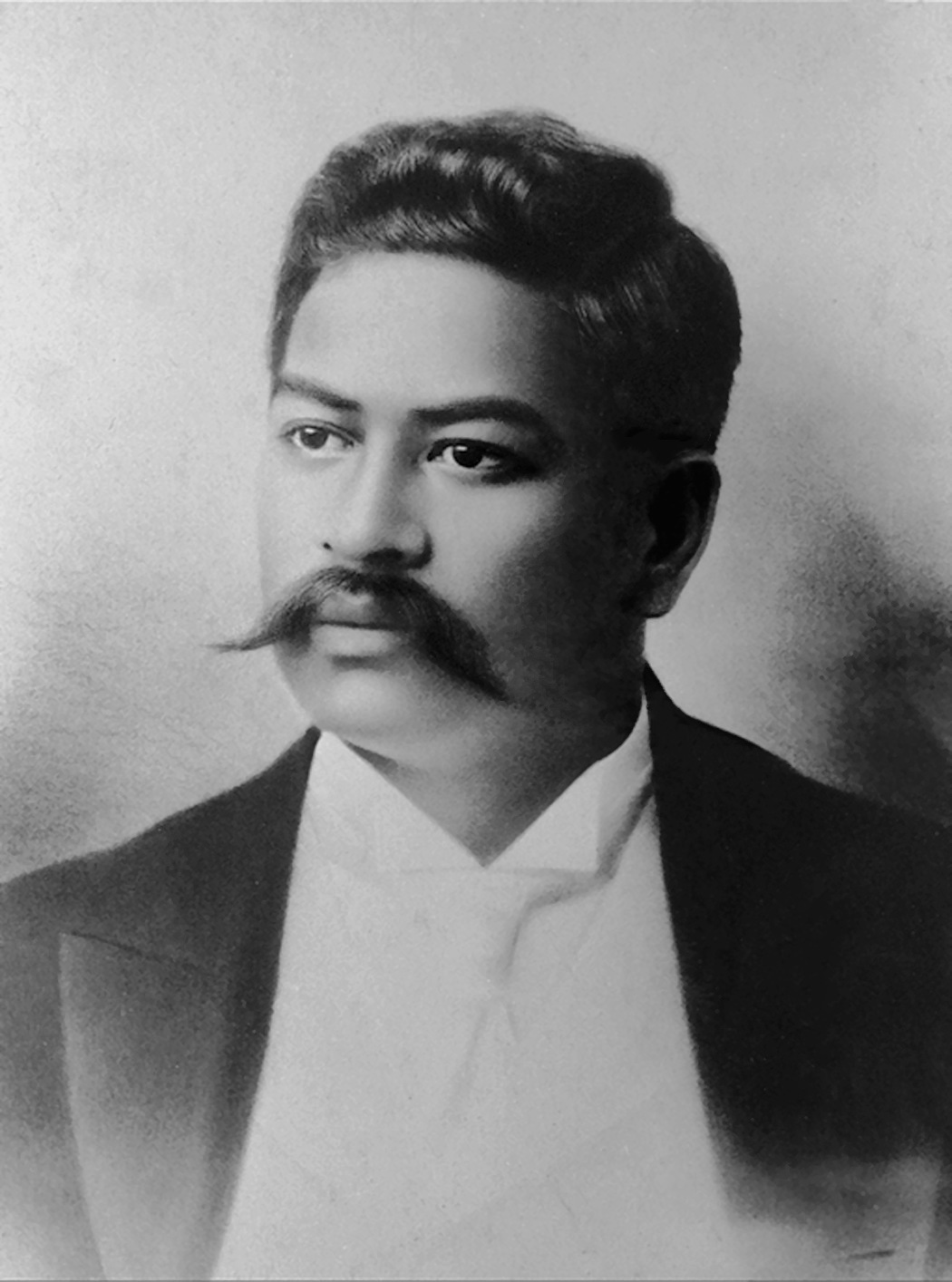
As prince of Hawaii

After the rule of the House of Kamehameha ended with the death of King Kamehameha V in 1872, and King Lunalilo died in 1874, the House of Kalākaua ascended to the throne of the Kingdom of Hawaiʻi. He became an orphan after his father died in 1878 and mother in 1884. Kalanianaʻole was adopted by King David Kalākaua's wife, Queen Kapiʻolani, who was his maternal aunt. This practice was called hānai, a traditional form of adoption widely used in ancient Hawaii, which made Kalanianaʻole a Prince of the Kingdom. After Kalākaua's death in 1891, Liliʻuokalani became queen, and she continued to favour Kalanianaʻole.

He worked in a minor position within the Department of the Interior and Customs Office.

However, in 1893 the overthrow of the Kingdom of Hawaii put in power first a Provisional Government of Hawaii, and then a republic with no role for monarchs.

== Post-overthrow activities ==
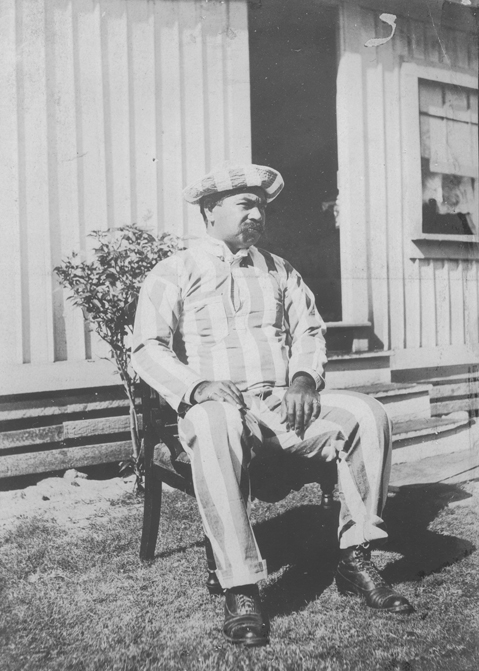
Kuhio in prison

At age twenty-four, he participated in the 1895 Wilcox rebellion against the Republic of Hawaiʻi. The rebels proved no match for the Republic troops and police, and shortly after hostilities began, all those involved in the rebellion were routed and captured. Kūhiō was sentenced to a year in prison while others were charged with treason and sentenced to execution (commuted to imprisonment). Kūhiō served his full term. His fiancée, Elizabeth Kahanu Kalanianaʻole visited him daily.

In 1898, the United States annexed Hawaii and the Territory of Hawaii was formed in 1900. His cousin Princess Kaʻiulani and his aunt Queen Dowager Kapiʻolani, who left her properties to Kūhiō and his brother, died in 1899. In response to these personal losses, Kūhiō and his wife left Hawaii from March 1900 to September 1901. They traveled widely in the United States and Europe, where they were treated as royalty. He traveled to South Africa where he either enlisted in the British Army or accompanied the army as an observer in the Second Boer War.

== From prince to statesman ==
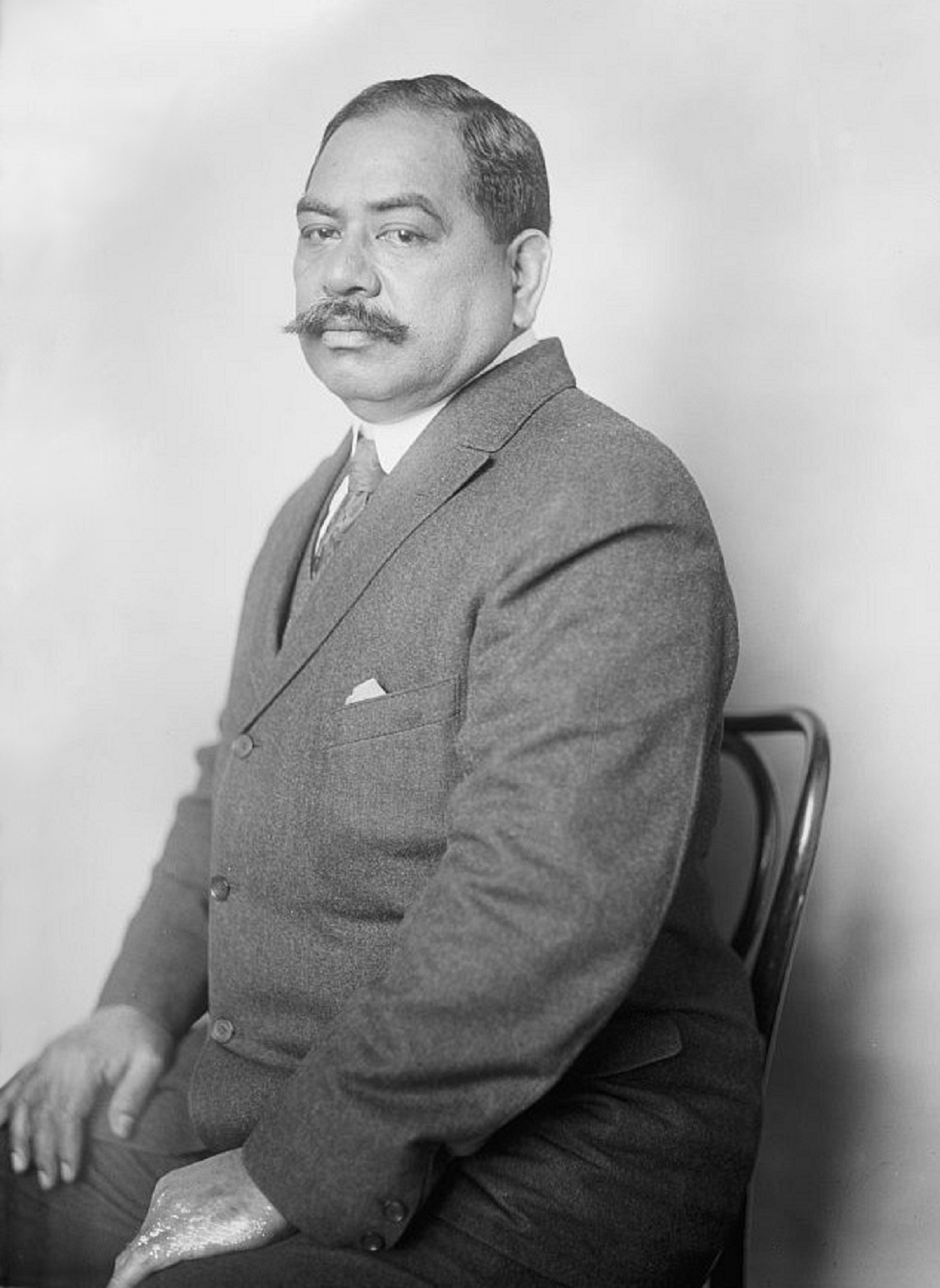
As a Congressional Delegate

Kūhiō returned from his self-imposed exile to take part in politics. He became active in the Home Rule Party of Hawaii, which represented native Hawaiians and continued to fight for Hawaiian independence.

On July 10, 1902, Prince Kūhiō split from the Home Rule Party, walking out of its convention along with nearly half of the other delegates. He formed the short-lived Hui Kuokoa Party. However, by September 1, 1902, Kuhio decided to join the Republican Party, was nominated as their candidate for Congress, and dramatically altered the political landscape. Kūhiō was elected delegate to the U.S. Congress as a Republican.

Kūhiō circulated a letter to Senators in 1920 that is descriptive of his thinking. "After extensive investigation and survey on the part of various organizations organized for the purpose of rehabilitating the race, it was found that the only method in which to rehabilitate the race was to place them back upon the soil."

He served from March 4, 1903, until his death, winning a total of ten elections. During this time he instituted local government at the county level, creating the county system that survives in Hawaiʻi. He staffed the resulting civil service positions with Hawaiian appointees. This move combined the political patronage system of 19th century American politics with the traditional Hawaiian chiefly role of beneficent delegation of authority to trusted retainers.

In 1903, Kūhiō reorganized the Royal Order of Kamehameha I, which held the first observance of the Kamehameha Day holiday in 1904. He was a founder of the first Hawaiian Civic Club on December 7, 1918. He helped organize a centenary celebration of the death of Kamehameha I in 1919.

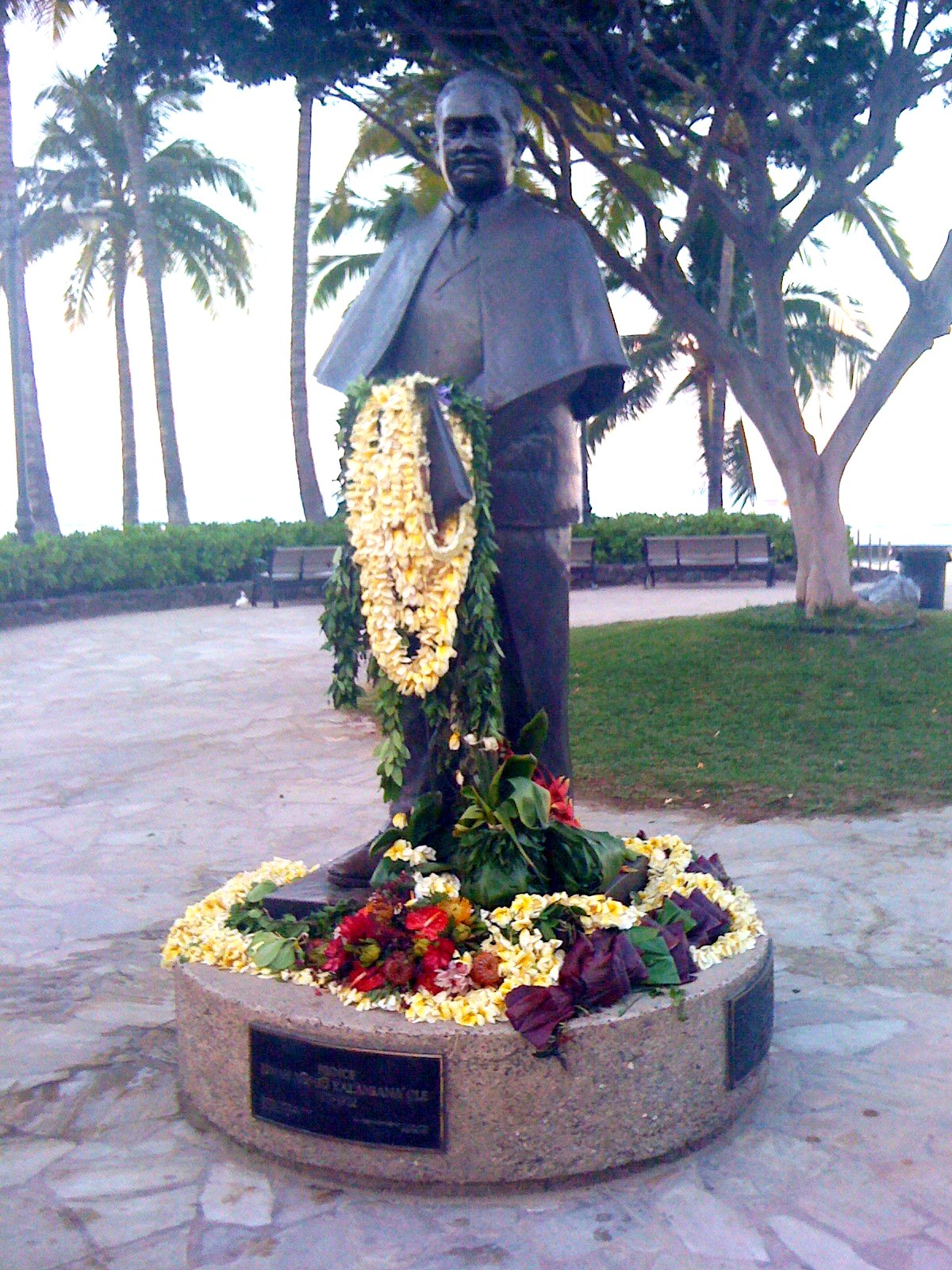
The Prince Kūhiō Statue at Waikīkī

In 1919, Kūhiō introduced in Congress the first-ever Hawaii Statehood Act. Forty years passed before it came to fruition.

=== Women's suffrage ===
In 1915, political parties in the territory asked Kūhiō to bring a bill to the U.S. Congress that requested the right for the territorial legislature to rule on women's suffrage. The Organic Act established the Territory of Hawaii and specifically forbade the territorial legislature from granting suffrage on the local level contrary to the federal constitution. Kūhiō received no attention from Congress on the matter, but brought the issue forward again in 1916.

In 1917 Kūhiō brought another bill to the United States Congress that was put forward by Senator John F. Shaforth. The bill would allow the territory of Hawaii to decide suffrage. In 1918 New England suffragist Almira Hollander Pitman, who was married to the son of Hawaiian chiefess Kinoʻoleoliliha, helped successfully advocate for the passage of that bill. Pitman used her political contacts to help Kūhiō. The bill was enacted in June 1918.

After the revision to the Organic Act, the Hawaiian legislature debated allowing women's suffrage from 1919 to 1920. The issue became deadlocked due to disagreement between the Hawaii Territorial Senate and the Hawaii Territorial House about whether the bill would take effect in the primary election of 1919 or 1920 and whether a referendum should decide the issue. Local legislation never passed because the following year Congress passed the suffrage-granting Nineteenth Amendment.

=== Hawaiian Homes Commission Act of 1921 ===
During this period, the Hawaiian Homes Commission Act of 1921 was enacted. Despite Kūhiō's wishes, the Act required that recipients verify blood-quantum requirements (the degree to which their ancestors were native Hawaiian), and leased land instead of granting fee-simple ownership, creating a perpetual government institution. This act and those that followed remain controversial in Hawaiian politics, and were used to justify more recent legislation such as the Akaka Bill. Kūhiō served on the first Hawaiian Homes Commission starting on September 16, 1921.

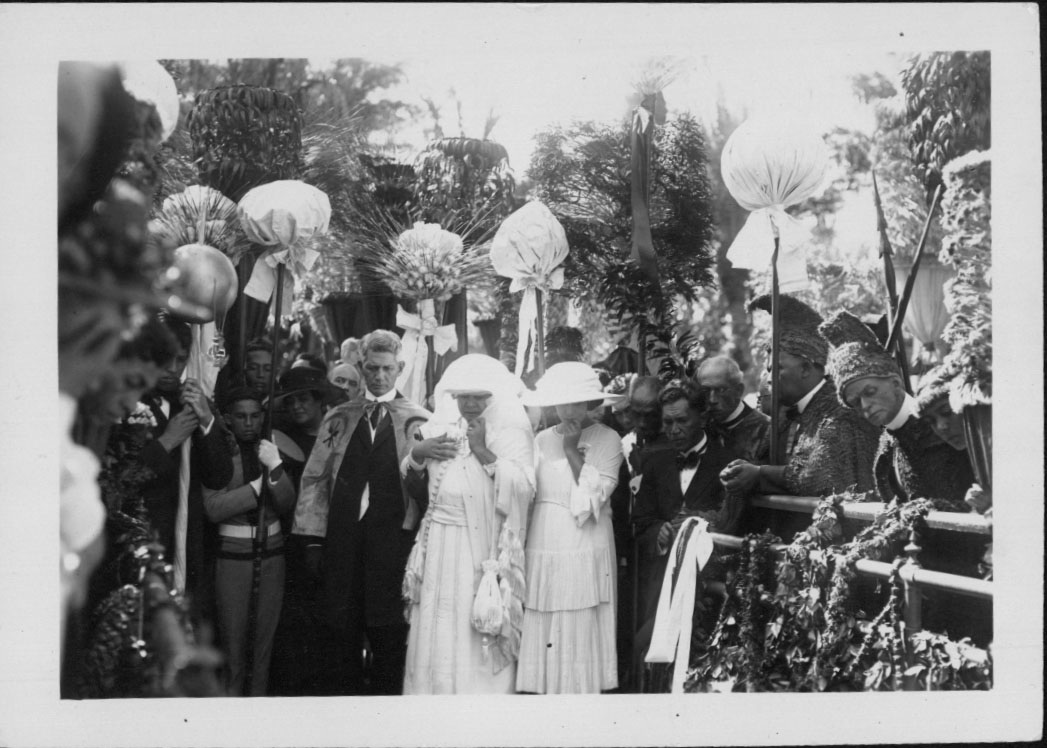
A scene from Kūhiō's funeral at the Royal Mausoleum

== Death and funeral ==
Kūhiō died on January 7, 1922. His body was interred near his royal family at the Royal Mausoleum known as Mauna ʻAla in Nuʻuanu on the island of Oʻahu. His widow Kahanu used her own funds (later reimbursed by the territorial government) to renovate the chapel at the mausoleum in his honor.

== Personal life ==
In 1888, Kalākaua sent Kūhiō to Japan where he was a guest of the Japanese government. He had wished that Kūhiō would marry a Japanese princess but this political alliance never materialized.

On January 29, 1894, when Princess Kaʻiulani was nineteen, Liliʻuokalani wrote asking her to consider marrying either Prince David Kawānanakoa, Prince Jonah Kūhiō Kalanianaʻole, or an unnamed Japanese prince (then studying in London). She reminded her, "It is the wish of the people that you should marry one or the other of the Princes, that we may have more [A]liis. There are no other Aliis who they look to except Prince David or his brother, who would be eligible to the throne..." It took five months for Kaʻiulani to respond to Liliʻuokalani's suggestion. In a June 22, 1894, letter Kaʻiulani asserted that she would prefer to marry for love unless it was necessary stating, "I feel it would be wrong if I married a man I did not love."

Kūhiō married Elizabeth Kahanu Kaʻauwai.

== Legacy ==
Kūhiō is memorialized by streets, beaches and surf breaks, Kuhio Beach Park in Poipu near his birthplace, the Prince Kūhiō Plaza Shopping Center, and the Prince Kuhio Federal Building named in his honor. Prince Kūhiō Day on March 26 is a state holiday that honors Kūhiō's birth. Three of Hawaii's public schools also honor him: Kalani High School in Honolulu, Prince Jonah Kūhiō Elementary School in Honolulu and Prince Jonah Kūhiō Kalanianaʻole Elementary and Intermediate School in Papaikou, Hawaii, near Hilo on the Island of Hawaii.

== See also ==
- List of Asian Americans and Pacific Islands Americans in the United States Congress
- List of members of the United States Congress who died in office (1900–1949)

== Bibliography ==
=== Books and journals ===
- Allen, Helena G. (1982). The Betrayal of Liliʻuokalani: Last Queen of Hawaii, 1838–1917. Glendale, CA: Arthur H. Clark Company. ISBN 978-0-87062-144-4. OCLC 9576325.
- Bunford, Stephen R. (2011). "Kaʻiulani, the Peacock Princess". Kamehameha's Crown: A History of the Hawaiian Monarchy. Bloomington, IN: Worldclay. pp. 184–196. ISBN 978-1-60481-945-8. OCLC 865107256. Archived from the original on 10 July 2020.
- Clark, John R. K. (2011). Hawaiian Surfing: Traditions from the Past. Honolulu: University of Hawaii Press. ISBN 978-0-8248-6032-5. OCLC 794925343.
- Cleghorn, Thomas A. K.; Cleghorn, Nellie Yarnell Maxwell; Argow, Dorothy; Allen, Katherine B. (1979). "Thomas Alexander Kaulaahi Cleghorn" (PDF). The Watumull Foundation, Oral History Project. Honolulu: 1–82. hdl:10524/48595. OCLC 10006035. Archived (PDF) from the original on 27 June 2020.
- Feeser, Andrea; Chan, Gaye (2006). Waikiki: A History of Forgetting and Remembering. Honolulu: University of Hawaii Press. ISBN 978-0-8248-2979-7. JSTOR ctt6wqr1w. OCLC 1090204874.
- Forbes, David W., ed. (2003). Hawaiian National Bibliography, 1780–1900, Volume 4: 1881–1900. Vol. 4. Honolulu: University of Hawaii Press. ISBN 978-0-8248-2636-9. OCLC 123279964. Archived from the original on 13 June 2020.
- Haley, James L. (2014). Captive Paradise: A History of Hawaii. New York: St. Martin's Press. ISBN 978-0-312-60065-5. OCLC 865158092. Archived from the original on 13 June 2020.
- Harper, Ida Husted, ed. (1922). History of Woman Suffrage: 1900–1920. Vol. VI. New York: National American Woman Suffrage Association. OCLC 10703030.
- Hodges, William C. Jr. (1918). The Passing of Liliʻuokalani: Preceded by a Brief Historical Interpretation of the Life of Liliʻuokalani of Hawaii. Honolulu: Honolulu Star-Bulletin. OCLC 4564101. Archived from the original on 12 July 2017.
- Iaukea, Sydney Lehua (2012). The Queen and I: A Story of Dispossessions and Reconnections in Hawaiʻi. Berkeley: University of California Press. ISBN 978-0-520-95030-6. OCLC 763161035. Archived from the original on 12 April 2020 – via Questia.
- Kam, Ralph Thomas (2017). Death Rites and Hawaiian Royalty: Funerary Practices in the Kamehameha and Kalākaua Dynasties, 1819–1953. S. I.: McFarland, Incorporated, Publishers. ISBN 978-1-4766-6846-8. OCLC 966566652. Archived from the original on 24 December 2019.
- Kamae, Lori (1980). The Empty Throne. Honolulu: Topgallant Publishing Co. ISBN 978-0-914916-44-4. OCLC 7080687. Archived from the original on 29 December 2019.
- Kamehiro, Stacy L. (2009). The Arts of Kingship: Hawaiian Art and National Culture of the Kalākaua Era. Honolulu: University of Hawaii Press. ISBN 978-0-8248-3263-6. OCLC 663885792.
- Kanahele, George S. (1995). Waikīkī, 100 B.C. to 1900 A.D.: An Untold Story. Honolulu: University of Hawaii Press. ISBN 978-0-8248-1790-9. OCLC 33009852.
- Kuykendall, Ralph Simpson (1943). "Negotiation of the Hawaiian Annexation Treaty of 1893" (PDF). Fifty-First Annual Report of the Hawaiian Historical Society for the Year 1942. Honolulu: Hawaiian Historical Society: 5–64. hdl:10524/90. Archived (PDF) from the original on 29 June 2020.
- Kuykendall, Ralph Simpson (1965) [1938]. The Hawaiian Kingdom 1778–1854, Foundation and Transformation. Vol. 1. Honolulu: University of Hawaii Press. ISBN 0-87022-431-X. OCLC 47008868. Archived from the original on 25 September 2014.
- Kuykendall, Ralph Simpson (1953). The Hawaiian Kingdom 1854–1874, Twenty Critical Years. Vol. 2. Honolulu: University of Hawaii Press. ISBN 978-0-87022-432-4. OCLC 47010821. Archived from the original on 13 December 2014.
- Kuykendall, Ralph Simpson (1967). The Hawaiian Kingdom 1874–1893, The Kalākaua Dynasty. Vol. 3. Honolulu: University of Hawaii Press. ISBN 978-0-87022-433-1. OCLC 500374815. Archived from the original on 20 January 2015.
- Liliʻuokalani (1898). Hawaii's Story by Hawaii's Queen, Liliʻuokalani. Boston: Lee & Shepard. ISBN 978-0-548-22265-2. OCLC 2387226.
- Linnea, Sharon (1999). Princess Kaʻiulani: Hope of a Nation, Heart of a People. Grand Rapids, MI: Eerdmans Young Readers. ISBN 978-0-8028-5088-1. OCLC 36727806.
- Mcdermott, John F.; Choy, Zita Cup; Guerrero, Anthony P. S. (2015). "The Last Illness and Death of Hawaiʻi's King Kalākaua: A New Historical/Clinical Perspective Cover". The Hawaiian Journal of History. 49. Honolulu: Hawaiian Historical Society: 59–72. doi:10.1353/hjh.2015.0002. hdl:10524/56606. OCLC 60626541. S2CID 162545638. Archived from the original on 1 August 2018.
- Mehmed, Ali (1998). "Hoʻohuiʻaina Pala Ka Maiʻa: Remembering Annexation One Hundred Years Ago". The Hawaiian Journal of History. 32. Honolulu: Hawaiian Historical Society: 141–154. hdl:10524/358. OCLC 60626541.
- Moser, Patrick (December 2016). "The Endurance of Surfing in 19th-century Hawaiʻi". The Journal of the Polynesian Society. 125 (4). Wellington: The Polynesian Society: 411–432. doi:10.15286/jps.125.4.411-432. OCLC 6925648463.
- Parker, David "Kawika" (2008). "Crypts of the Ali'i The Last Refuge of the Hawaiian Royalty". Tales of Our Hawaiʻi (PDF). Honolulu: Alu Like, Inc. OCLC 309392477. Archived from the original (PDF) on 11 November 2013.
- Peterson, Barbara Bennett, ed. (1984). Notable Women of Hawaii. Honolulu: University of Hawaii Press. ISBN 978-0-8248-0820-4. OCLC 11030010.
- Proto, Neil Thomas (2009). The Rights of My People: Liliʻuokalani's Enduring Battle with the United States, 1893–1917. New York: Algora Publishing. ISBN 978-0-87586-720-5. OCLC 319248358. Archived from the original on 16 July 2020.
- Pukui, Mary Kawena; Elbert, Samuel H. (1986). Hawaiian Dictionary: Hawaiian-English, English-Hawaiian. Honolulu: University of Hawaii Press. ISBN 978-0-8248-0703-0. OCLC 12751521. Archived from the original on 1 January 2015.
- Pukui, Mary Kawena; Elbert, Samuel H.; Mookini, Esther T. (1974). Place Names of Hawaii. Honolulu: University of Hawaii Press. ISBN 978-0-8248-0524-1. OCLC 1042464. Archived from the original on 1 November 2019.
- Quigg, Agnes (1988). "Kalakaua's Hawaiian Studies Abroad Program" (PDF). The Hawaiian Journal of History. 22. Honolulu: Hawaiian Historical Society: 170–208. hdl:10524/103. OCLC 60626541. Archived (PDF) from the original on 27 June 2020.
- Stassen-McLaughlin, Marilyn (1999). "Unlucky Star – Princess Kaʻiulani" (PDF). The Hawaiian Journal of History. 33. Honolulu: Hawaiian Historical Society: 21–54. hdl:10524/450. OCLC 60626541. Archived (PDF) from the original on 17 June 2020.
- Van Dyke, Jon M. (2008). Who Owns the Crown Lands of Hawaiʻi?. Honolulu: University of Hawaii Press. ISBN 978-0-8248-3211-7. OCLC 163812857. Archived from the original on 22 July 2020.
- Webb, Nancy; Webb, Jean Francis (1998) [1962]. Kaʻiulani: Crown Princess of Hawaii. Honolulu: Mutual Publishing. ISBN 978-1-56647-206-7. OCLC 265217757.
- Yasutake, Rumi (2017). "Re-Franchising Women of Hawaiʻi, 1912–1920: Politics of Gender, Sovereignty, Race, and Rank at the Crossroads of the Pacific". In Choy, Catherine Ceniza; Wu, Judy Tzu-Chun (eds.). Gendering the Trans-Pacific World. Leiden: Brill. ISBN 978-90-04-33610-0. OCLC 976394366.

=== Newspapers and online sources ===
U.S. House of Representatives
Preceded by Robert William Wilcox	Delegate to the U.S. House of Representatives from Hawaii's at-large congressional district March 4, 1903 – January 7, 1922	Succeeded by Henry Alexander Baldwin
