= Hawaii's at-large congressional district =

Former congressional district

- Obsolete district
- Created: 1959
- Eliminated: 1970
- Years active: 1959–1971

Before achieving statehood in 1959, the Territory of Hawaii was represented by a non-voting territorial delegate. From statehood until 1963, Hawaii had one Representative. From 1963 to the creation of the two districts in 1971, Hawaii was represented in the United States House of Representatives with two Representatives. The district was eliminated in the 1970 redistricting cycle after the 1970 United States census.

== List of members representing the district ==
A second seat was added in 1963.

| Years | Cong ress | Seat A | | | Seat B | | |
| Years | Cong ress | Representative | Party | Electoral history | Representative | Party | Electoral history |
|---|---|---|---|---|---|---|---|
| August 21, 1959 – January 3, 1963 | 86th 87th | Daniel Inouye (Honolulu) | Democratic | Elected in 1959. Re-elected in 1960. Retired to run for U.S. senator. | | | |
| January 3, 1963 – January 3, 1965 | 88th | Spark Matsunaga (Honolulu) | Democratic | Elected in 1962. Re-elected in 1964. Re-elected in 1966. Re-elected in 1968. Redistricted to the 1st district. | Thomas Gill (Honolulu) | Democratic | Elected in 1962. Retired to run for U.S. senator. |
| January 3, 1965 – January 3, 1971 | 89th 90th 91st | Spark Matsunaga (Honolulu) | Democratic | Elected in 1962. Re-elected in 1964. Re-elected in 1966. Re-elected in 1968. Redistricted to the 1st district. | Patsy Mink (Waipahu) | Democratic | Elected in 1964. Re-elected in 1966. Re-elected in 1968. Redistricted to the 2nd district. |
