= Home Rule Party of Hawaii =

Political party in Hawaii, 1900–1912

Independent Party ʻAoʻao Kūʻokoʻa o Hawaiʻi
- Leader: Robert William Wilcox; Jonah Kūhiō Kalanianaʻole; Charles Kahiliaulani Notley
- Founded: June 6, 1900
- Dissolved: 1912
- Merged into: Hawaii Republican Party
- Headquarters: Honolulu
- Ideology: Republicanism; American republicanism Hawaiian nationalism Home Rule (Hawaiian); Native Hawaiian interests
- Political position: Center to center-right

The Hawaiian Independent Party (later renamed the Independent Home Rule Party), was a political party active in Hawaii from 1900 to 1912, during which time Hawaii was controlled by the United States and administered as the Territory of Hawaii. The Party was established by Robert Wilcox, immediately after the United States annexed the Hawaiian Islands with the Newlands Resolution in 1898 and established the Territory of Hawaii with the Hawaiian Organic Act in 1900. The party was formed to represent and advocate for the rights and interests of Native Hawaiians, many of whom were then inclined to believe that both the Democratic Party of Hawai‘i and Hawai‘i Republican Party were yet incapable of representing them.

== Formation ==
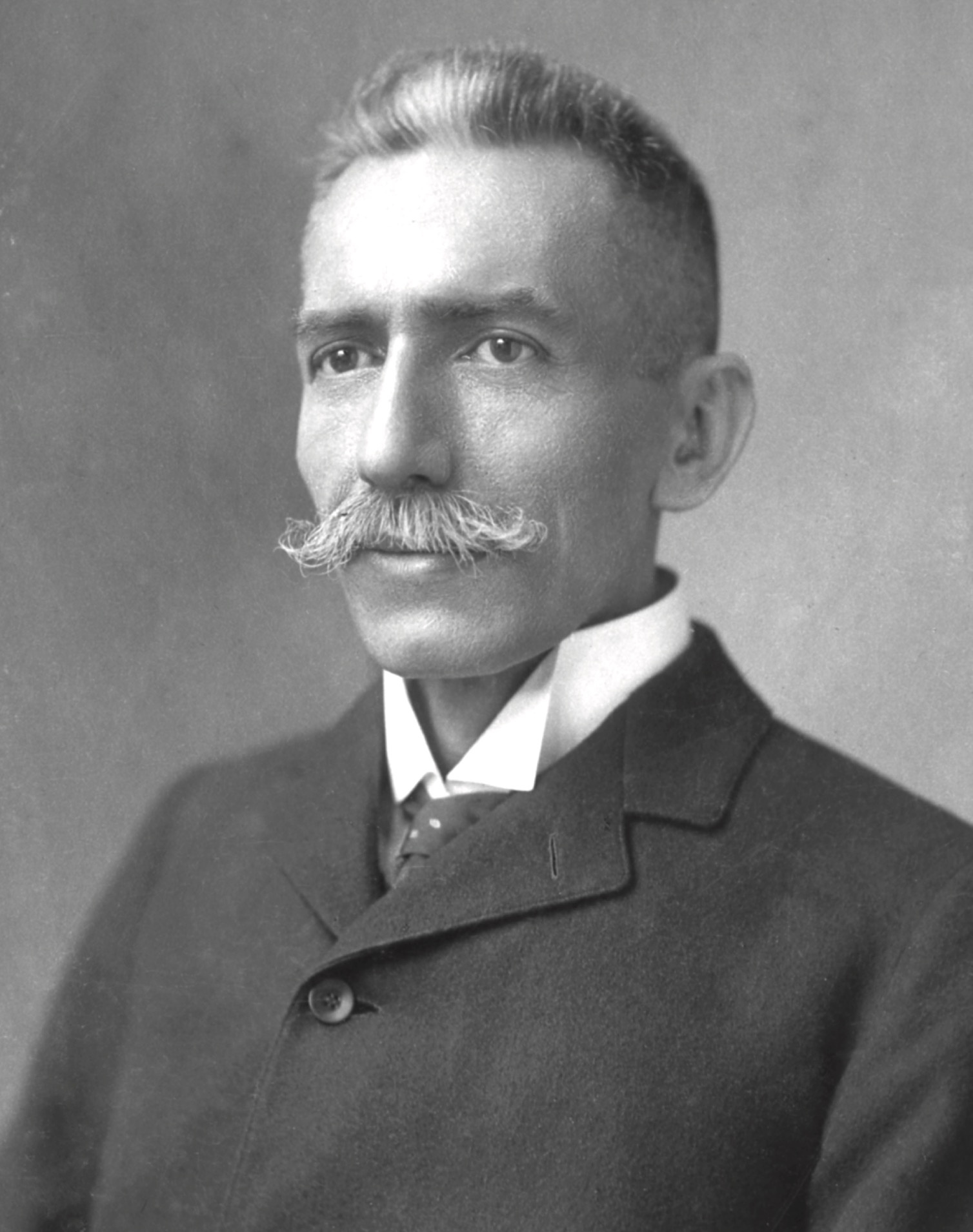
Robert William Wilcox in 1900

On June 6, 1900, Robert Wilcox, returned to Hawaii from the mainland U.S., which he had visited in order to advocate for the inclusion native Hawaiian rights in the Organic Act. Upon his return, Wilcox spoke to a rally sponsored by Hui Aloha ʻĀina and Hui Kalaiʻāina, the two main Hawaiian political clubs. In his speech, he said, "The question of the restoration of the Monarchy is gone from us forever. We are now a people, however, who can vote. You all know we have two-thirds of the votes in this country."

== Legislature ==
In the first election in 1900 the ruling Republican Party (formerly the Reform Party) misjudged the voting demographics under the territorialship, though the new government excluded Asians, women, and other minorities, it allowed more people to become eligible voters, swinging the voting majority toward Native Hawaiians. The Home Rule Party succeeded on a nationalist platform in becoming the majority party in the Territorial Senate. In the Territorial House of Representatives, the Home Rule party gained a plurality, but importantly not a majority, of the seats. They sent Robert William Wilcox to represent the territory in the United States Congress. On November 11, 1900, the Independent Home Rule Party was formally established, and the two anti-annexation groups that formed it, Hui Aloha ʻĀina and Hui Kālaiʻāina, were officially dissolved.

As a newly elected delegate from Hawaii, Wilcox proved to be fairly ineffective. On the floor of the United States House of Representatives, Wilcox was challenged by his poor command of the English language, and his lack of alignment with either of the main parties (Democrat and Republican). Although upon his election, he took a more moderate tone, the Home Rule Party proved to be obstructionist and was blamed for a distinct lack of progress in the Territorial legislature. One particular political miscalculation of note was Wilcox's support of the so-called leper bill, which cost him a great deal of support amongst his native Hawaiian base.

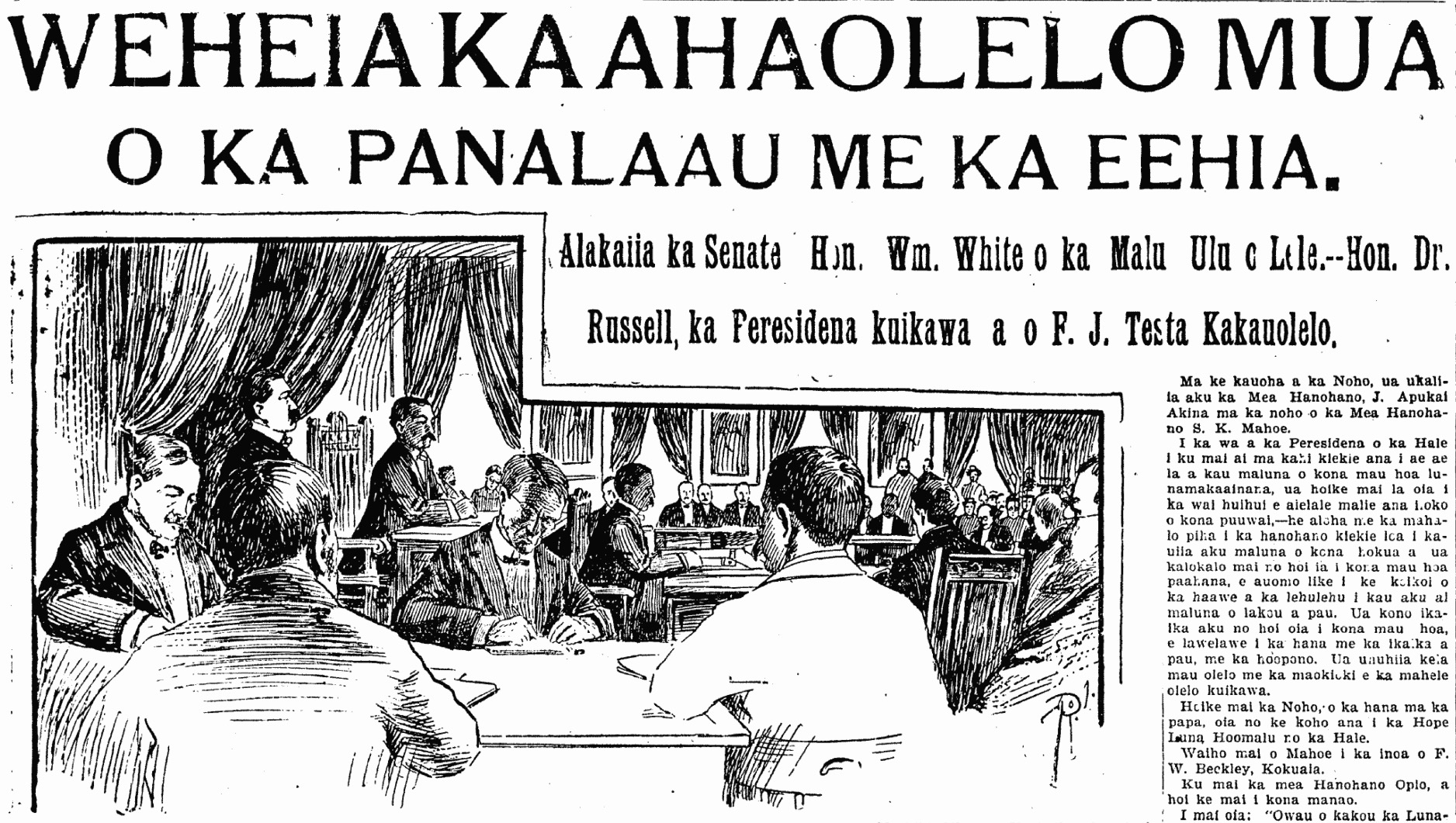
Opening of the legislature on the front page of Ka Nūpepa Kūʻokoʻa

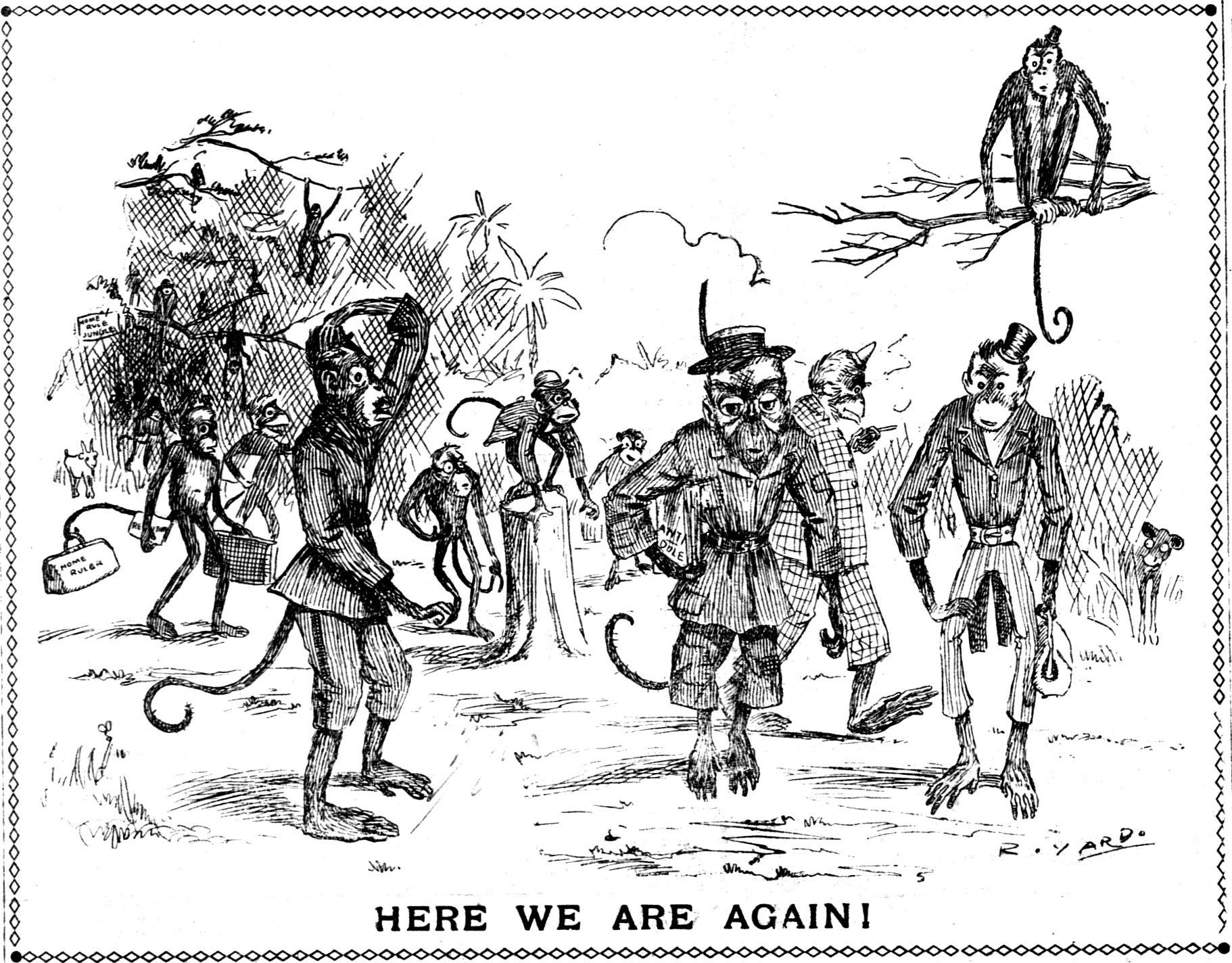
Here We Are Again, negative portrayal of the 1901 Hawaii Territorial Legislature in The Pacific Commercial Advertiser

The Home Rule Party controlled Territorial Legislature of 1901 has been negatively cast as an ineffective and chaotic in the historical narrative of Hawaii, although recent scholarship have painted a different picture. During the period they controlled both chambers of the legislature. They attempted to pass new laws in the interest of the local people, who included Hawaiian taro farmers, patients of the Kalaupapa Leprosy Settlement and victims of the 1900 Chinatown fire, among others. In total, fifty-one bills were introduced in the Senate and one hundred and twenty-six in the House, although only nineteen bills were submitted by both houses for ratification. They proposed creating a government-funded education program for poor Hawaiian students similar to the Education of Hawaiian Youths Abroad program initiated during the reign of King Kalākaua. A pension for the deposed Queen Lili‘uokalani and appropriation to repair the Royal Mausoleum of Hawaii were also proposed. They insisted on the use of both Hawaiian and English in the legislature with the aide of an interpreter, ignoring the Organic Act which mandated the sole use of English in the legislature. Many of the legislators in this session did not speak English.

However, their agenda was obstructed by the Republicans and the appointed members of territorial government, especially Governor Sanford B. Dole. In this session, the Home Rulers attempted to decentralize control away from the governor and empower local government by passing a bill creating the first counties in Hawaii. The bill would have created five counties: County of Lunalilo (Kauai and Niihau), County of Liliuokalani (Maui, Molokai, Lanai and Kahoolawe), County of Kauikeaouli (Hawaii including Hilo, Puna and Kau), County of Kamehameha (Hawaii including Hamakua, North Kohala, South Kohala, South Kona and North Kona), County of Kalohana (Oahu). This county bill was defeated by Dole through a pocket veto after the prorogation of the regular session. The legislative assembly was later mockingly dubbed the "Lady Dog Legislature" because of extensive legislative debate on House Bill No. 15, An Act To Amend Section 814, Chapter 59, of the Civil Laws, by Representative Simon H. Haaheo which would have repealed an 1898 tax on ownership of female dogs. This nickname was used by opponents of the Home Rulers to denigrate the group and the difficulties of the 1901 legislature would later be used as evidence of the incompetence of Native Hawaiian political leadership.

== Decline ==
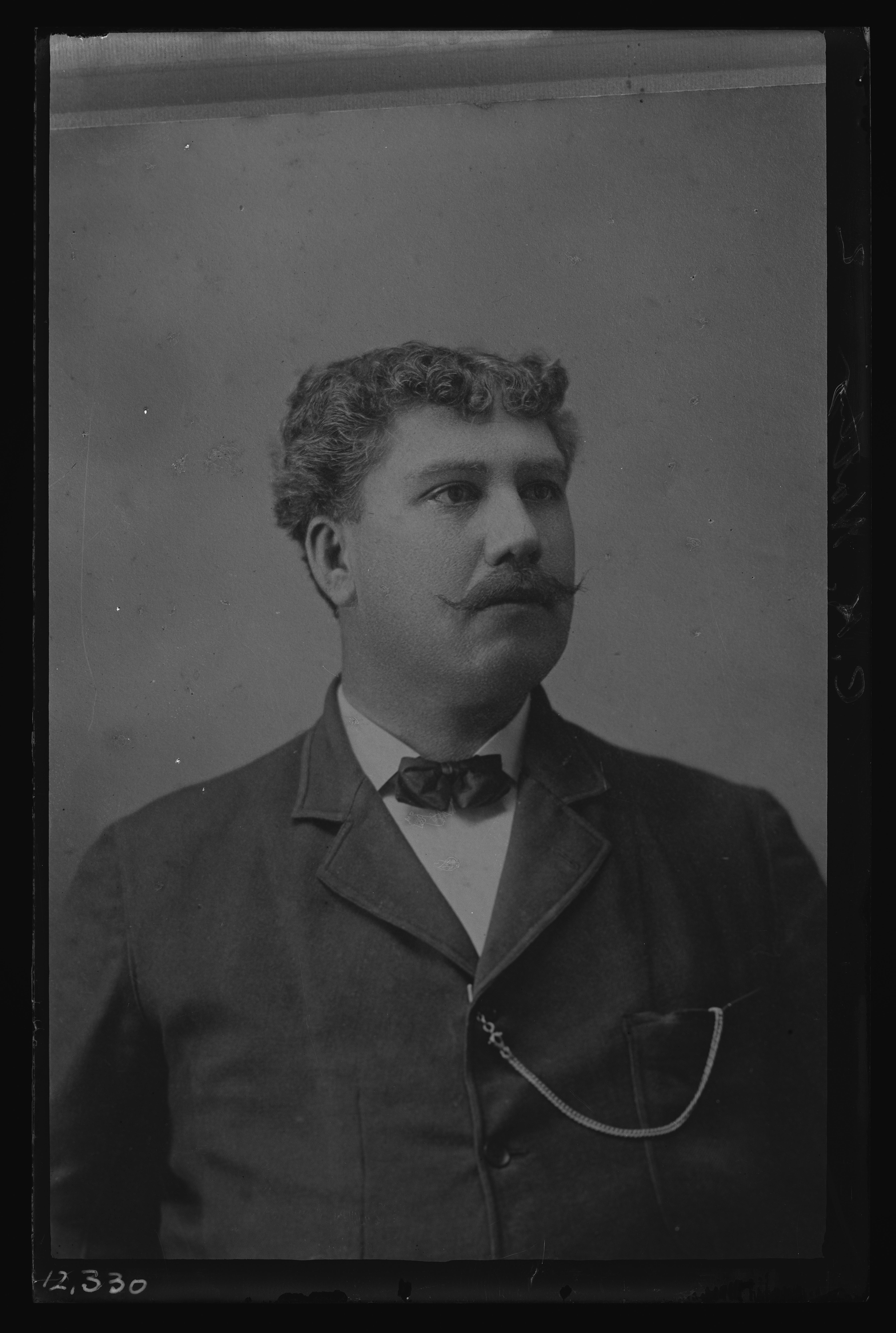
Charles Kahiliaulani Notley in 1906

On July 10, 1902, Prince Kuhio split from the Home Rule Party, walking out of its convention along with nearly half of the delegates there. He formed the short-lived Hui Kuokoa Party. However, by September 1, 1902, Kuhio decided to join the Republican Party, was nominated as their candidate for Congress, and dramatically altered the political landscape. Election day, November 4, 1902, proved to be devastating to the Home Rule Party. Republicans won 26 legislative seats, the Home Rulers 9, and the Democrats one.

After Wilcox's death, the party ran Charles Kahiliaulani Notley against Kuhio for another decade losing the election each time. The party steadily lost ground to the Republican party in the legislative and county elections. However, they still ran candidates during each election. For example, Maui politician William Pūnohu White ran unsuccessfully in every election between 1902 and 1914 to regain the senate seat after his brief stint in the first Territorial legislature. The Home Rule Party eventually disbanded in 1912.

== Aloha ʻĀina Party ==
In 1997, the Aloha ʻĀina Party of Hawaii was established by UH dance instructor Vicky Holt Takamine as a putative reestablishment of the Home Rule Party. The party's philosophy is conservationism and nationalism.

== Bibliography ==
- Andrade, Ernest (1996). Unconquerable Rebel: Robert W. Wilcox and Hawaiian Politics, 1880–1903. Niwot, CO: University Press of Colorado. ISBN 978-0-87081-417-4. OCLC 247224388.
- Hayashida, Ronald; Kittelson, David (1977). "The Odyssey of Nicholas Russell" (PDF). The Hawaiian Journal of History. 11. Honolulu: Hawaiian Historical Society: 110–124. hdl:10524/110. OCLC 60626541.
- Ogura, Shiku Ito (1935). County Government in Hawaii. Hilo, HI: Hawaii News Print Shop. OCLC 12499255.
- Williams, Ronald Jr. (2015). "Race, Power, and the Dilemma of Democracy: Hawaiʻi's First Territorial Legislature, 1901". The Hawaiian Journal of History. 49. Honolulu: Hawaiian Historical Society: 1–45. doi:10.1353/hjh.2015.0017. hdl:10524/56604. OCLC 60626541. S2CID 155592084 – via Project MUSE.
