= Hawaii's congressional delegations =

Map of Hawaii's two congressional districts for the United States House of Representatives since 2022

Since Hawaii became a state in 1959, it has sent congressional delegations to the United States Senate and United States House of Representatives. Each state elects two senators to serve for six years. Members of the House of Representatives are elected to two-year terms, one from each of Hawaii's congressional districts. Before becoming a state, the Territory of Hawaii elected a non-voting delegate at-large to Congress from 1900 to 1958.

The longest-serving senator was Daniel Inouye, from 1963 to 2012—he served as President pro tempore of the United States Senate from 2010 to 2012 as the longest-serving senator. Patsy Mink was the first woman of color to serve in the House, and the first woman to represent Hawaii in Congress.

== Current delegation ==
Current U.S. senators from Hawaii
Hawaii CPVI (2025): D+13	Class I senator	Class III senator
Hawaii CPVI (2025): D+13	Mazie Hirono (Junior senator) (Honolulu)	Brian Schatz (Senior senator) (Honolulu)
Party	Democratic	Democratic
Incumbent since	January 3, 2013	December 26, 2012

Hawaii's current congressional delegation in the 119th Congress consists of its two senators and two representatives, all of whom are Democrats.

The current dean of the Hawaii delegation is Mazie Hirono, having served in the Senate since 2013 and in Congress since 2007.

Current U.S. representatives from Hawaii
District	Member (Residence)	Party	Incumbent since	CPVI (2025)	District map
1st	Ed Case (Kāneʻohe)	Democratic	January 3, 2019	D+13	
2nd	Jill Tokuda (Kāneʻohe)	Democratic	January 3, 2023	D+12	

== United States Senate ==
Each state elects two senators by statewide popular vote every six years. The terms of the two senators are staggered so that they are not elected in the same year, meaning that each seat also has a class determining the years in which the seat will be up for election. Hawaii's senators are elected in classes 1 and 3.

There have been seven senators elected from Hawaii, of whom six have been Democrats and one has been a Republican. Hawaii's current senators, both Democrats, are Mazie Hirono, in office since 2013, and Brian Schatz, in office since 2012.

Democratic (D) Republican (R)

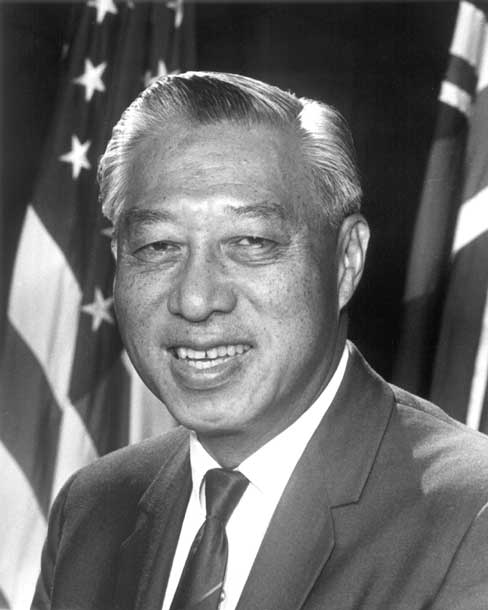
Hiram Fong, Hawaii's only Republican senator

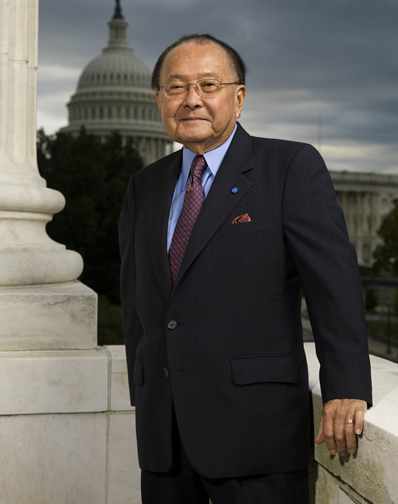
Daniel Inouye, Hawaii's longest-serving senator from 1963 to 2012 and former President pro tempore of the United States Senate

United States Senate
Class I senator	Congress	Class III senator
Hiram Fong (R)	86th (1959–1961)	Oren E. Long (D)
Hiram Fong (R)	87th (1961–1963)	Oren E. Long (D)
Hiram Fong (R)	88th (1963–1965)	Daniel Inouye (D) (Note: Senator Inouye died while in office. He requested that Representative Colleen Hanabusa be appointed to the seat by Governor Neil Abercrombie, but Abercrombie appointed Brian Schatz to fill the seat.)
Hiram Fong (R)	89th (1965–1967)	Daniel Inouye (D)
Hiram Fong (R)	90th (1967–1969)	Daniel Inouye (D)
Hiram Fong (R)	91st (1969–1971)	Daniel Inouye (D)
Hiram Fong (R)	92nd (1971–1973)	Daniel Inouye (D)
Hiram Fong (R)	93rd (1973–1975)	Daniel Inouye (D)
Hiram Fong (R)	94th (1975–1977)	Daniel Inouye (D)
Spark Matsunaga (D) (Note: Senator Matsunaga died while in office.)	95th (1977–1979)	Daniel Inouye (D)
Spark Matsunaga (D)	96th (1979–1981)	Daniel Inouye (D)
Spark Matsunaga (D)	97th (1981–1983)	Daniel Inouye (D)
Spark Matsunaga (D)	98th (1983–1985)	Daniel Inouye (D)
Spark Matsunaga (D)	99th (1985–1987)	Daniel Inouye (D)
Spark Matsunaga (D)	100th (1987–1989)	Daniel Inouye (D)
Spark Matsunaga (D)	101st (1989–1991)	Daniel Inouye (D)
Daniel Akaka (D)	101st (1989–1991)	Daniel Inouye (D)
Daniel Akaka (D)	102nd (1991–1993)	Daniel Inouye (D)
Daniel Akaka (D)	103rd (1993–1995)	Daniel Inouye (D)
Daniel Akaka (D)	104th (1995–1997)	Daniel Inouye (D)
Daniel Akaka (D)	105th (1997–1999)	Daniel Inouye (D)
Daniel Akaka (D)	106th (1999–2001)	Daniel Inouye (D)
Daniel Akaka (D)	107th (2001–2003)	Daniel Inouye (D)
Daniel Akaka (D)	108th (2003–2005)	Daniel Inouye (D)
Daniel Akaka (D)	109th (2005–2007)	Daniel Inouye (D)
Daniel Akaka (D)	110th (2007–2009)	Daniel Inouye (D)
Daniel Akaka (D)	111th (2009–2011)	Daniel Inouye (D)
Daniel Akaka (D)	112th (2011–2013)	Daniel Inouye (D)
Daniel Akaka (D)	112th (2011–2013)	Brian Schatz (D)
Mazie Hirono (D)	113th (2013–2015)	Brian Schatz (D)
Mazie Hirono (D)	114th (2015–2017)	Brian Schatz (D)
Mazie Hirono (D)	115th (2017–2019)	Brian Schatz (D)
Mazie Hirono (D)	116th (2019–2021)	Brian Schatz (D)
Mazie Hirono (D)	117th (2021–2023)	Brian Schatz (D)
Mazie Hirono (D)	118th (2023–2025)	Brian Schatz (D)
Mazie Hirono (D)	119th (2025–2027)	Brian Schatz (D)
Mazie Hirono (D)	120th (2027–2029)	Brian Schatz (D)

== U.S. House of Representatives ==
=== Territorial delegates ===
The Territory of Hawaii was an organized incorporated territory of the United States formed by the Hawaiian Organic Act on April 30, 1900, following the annexation of Hawaii. The territory initially consisted of the Hawaiian Islands, although the Palmyra Atoll was separated from Hawaii when it was admitted into the Union.

The territorial delegates were elected to two-year terms from the at-large congressional district in the Hawaii Territory. Delegates were allowed to serve on committees, debate, and submit legislation, but were not permitted to vote on bills. The first delegate, Robert William Wilcox, took office on December 15, 1900, and the last delegate, John A. Burns, left office on August 21, 1959, succeeded on the same day by representative Daniel Inouye. Delegates only served in the House of Representatives, as there was no representation in the Senate until Hawaii became a state.

Democratic (D) Republican (R) Home Rule (HR)

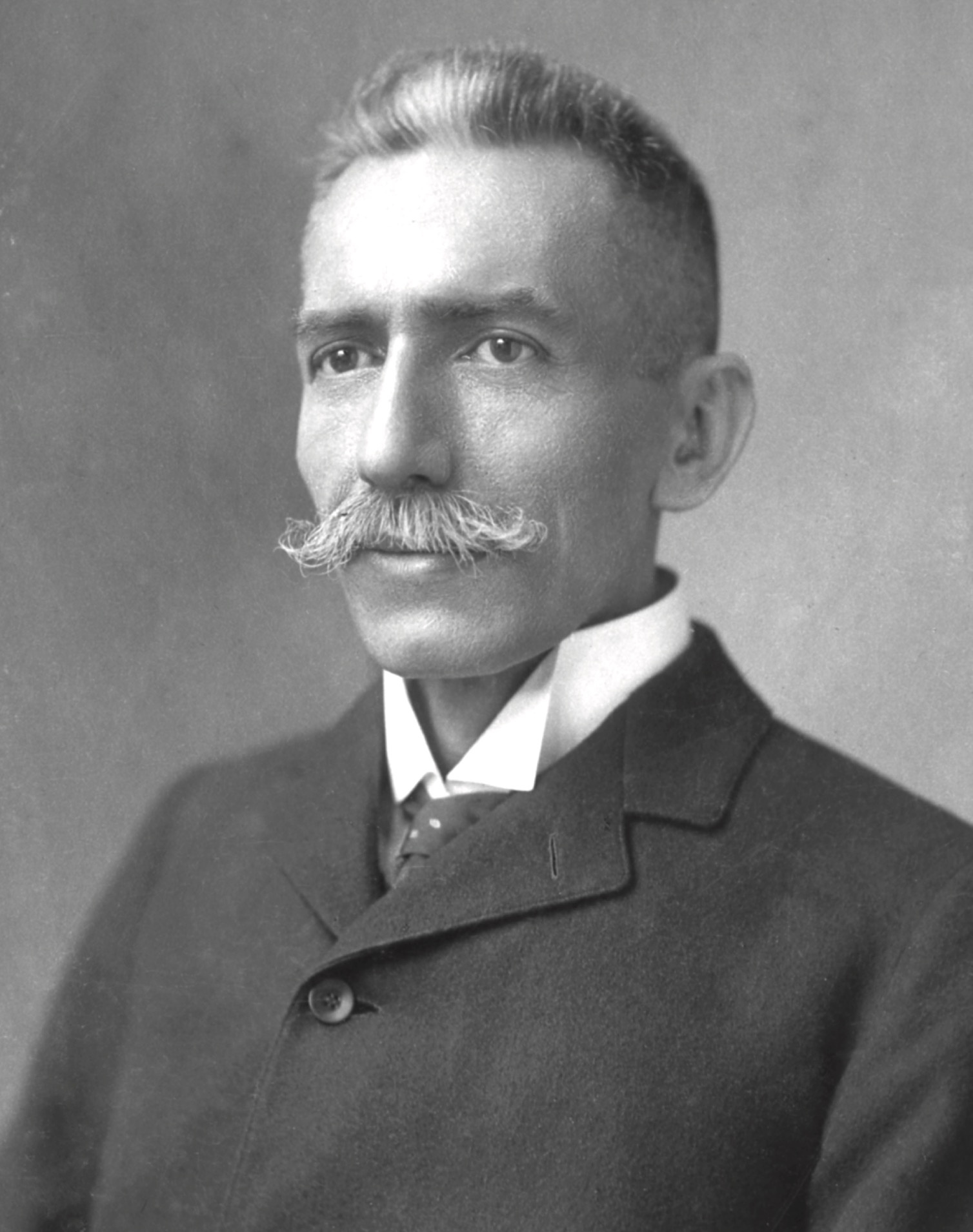
Robert William Wilcox, the first congressional delegate from Hawaii and the only delegate from the Home Rule Party of Hawaii

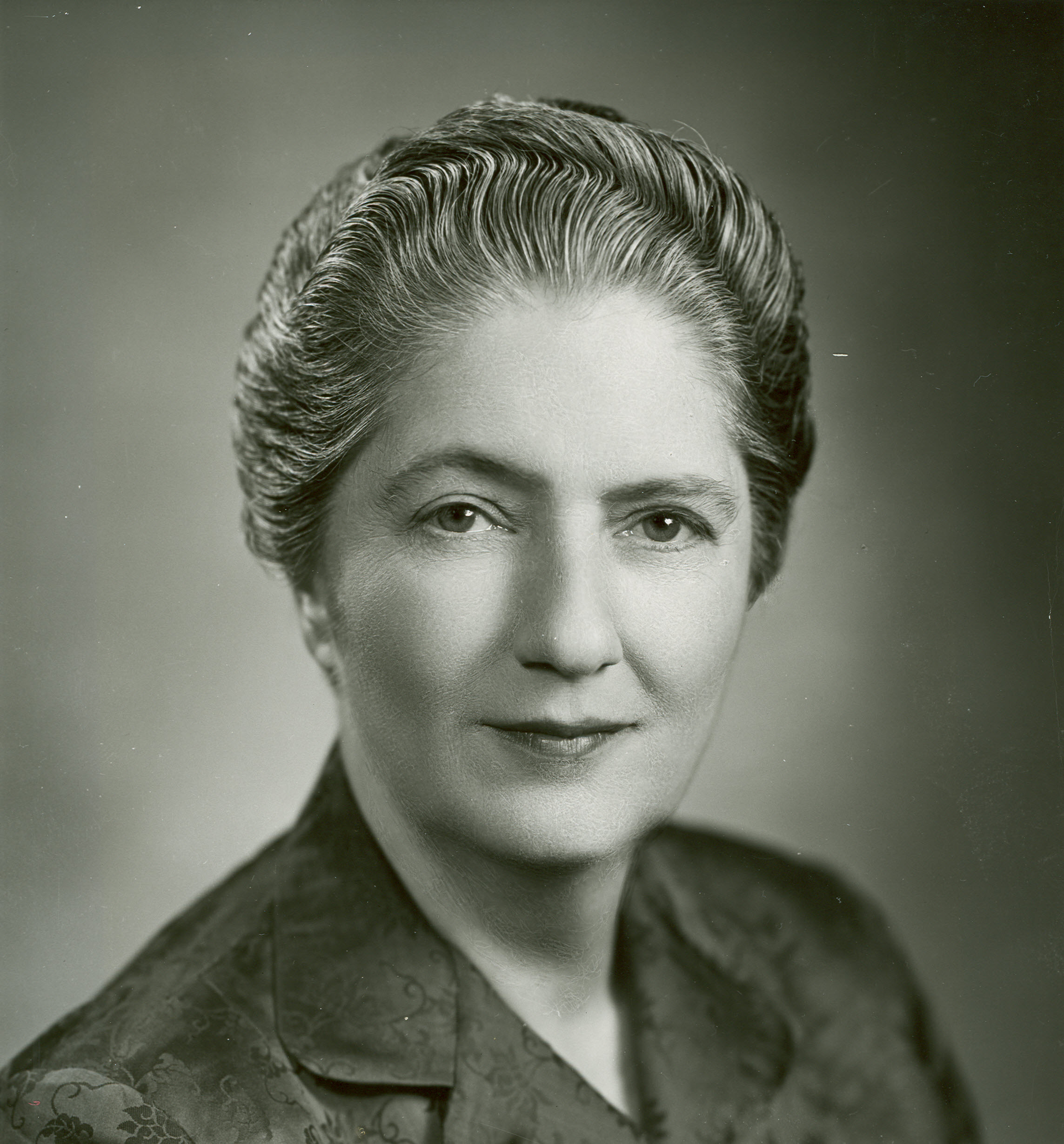
Elizabeth P. Farrington, a delegate who succeeded her husband after his death

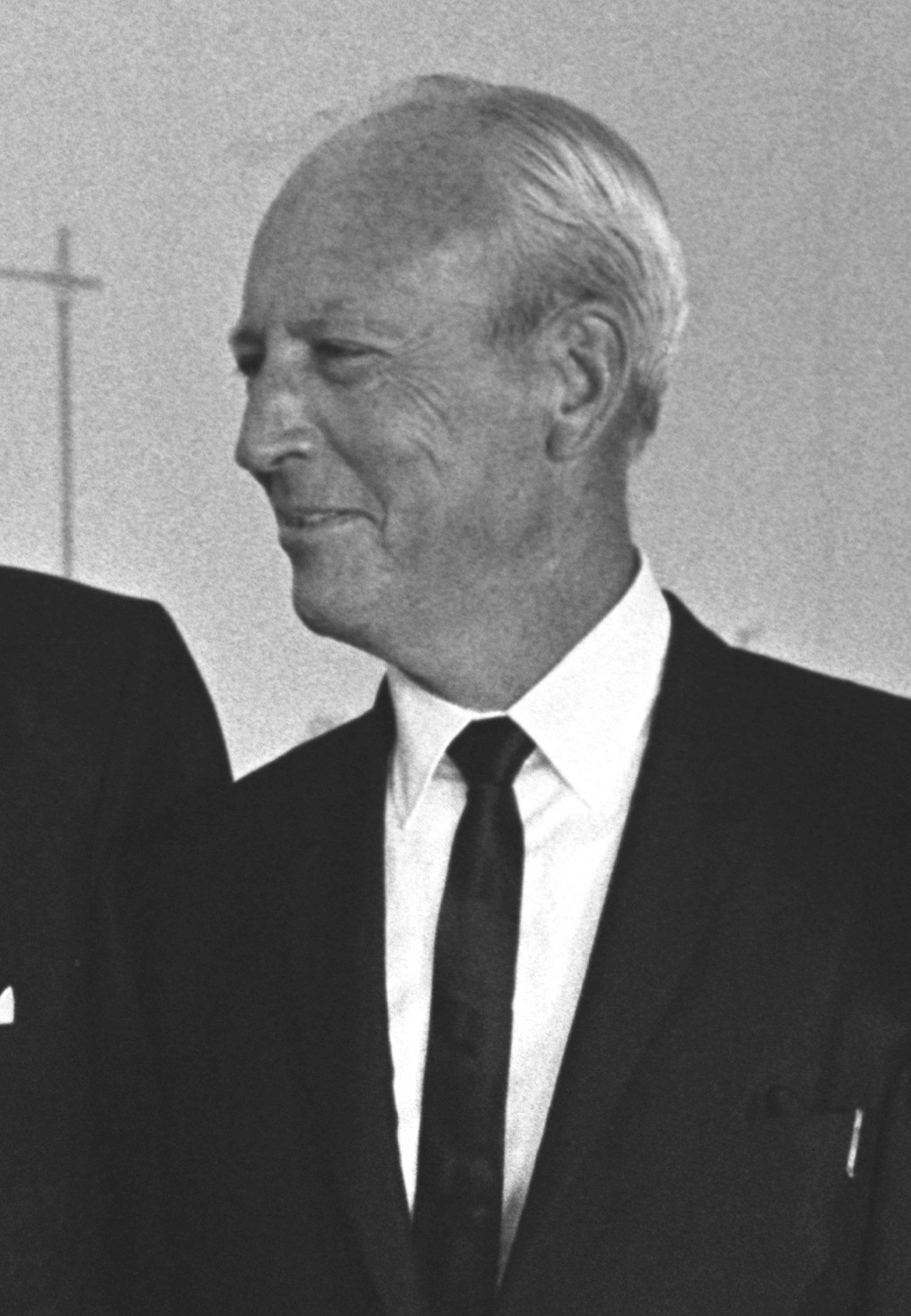
John A. Burns, Hawaii Territory's last delegate before statehood

Territorial delegates
Congress	Delegate
56th (1899–1901)	Robert William Wilcox (HR)
57th (1901–1903)	Robert William Wilcox (HR)
58th (1903–1905)	Jonah Kūhiō; Kalanianaʻole (R)
59th (1905–1907)	Jonah Kūhiō; Kalanianaʻole (R)
60th (1907–1909)	Jonah Kūhiō; Kalanianaʻole (R)
61st (1909–1911)	Jonah Kūhiō; Kalanianaʻole (R)
62nd (1911–1913)	Jonah Kūhiō; Kalanianaʻole (R)
63rd (1913–1915)	Jonah Kūhiō; Kalanianaʻole (R)
64th (1915–1917)	Jonah Kūhiō; Kalanianaʻole (R)
65th (1917–1919)	Jonah Kūhiō; Kalanianaʻole (R)
66th (1919–1921)	Jonah Kūhiō; Kalanianaʻole (R)
67th (1921–1923)	Henry Alexander Baldwin (R)
68th (1923–1925)	William Paul Jarrett (D)
69th (1925–1927)	William Paul Jarrett (D)
70th (1927–1929)	Victor S. K. Houston (R)
71st (1929–1931)	Victor S. K. Houston (R)
72nd (1931–1933)	Victor S. K. Houston (R)
73rd (1933–1935)	Lincoln L. McCandless (D)
74th (1935–1937)	Samuel Wilder King (R)
75th (1937–1939)	Samuel Wilder King (R)
76th (1939–1941)	Samuel Wilder King (R)
77th (1941–1943)	Samuel Wilder King (R)
78th (1943–1945)	Joseph R. Farrington (R) (Note: Delegate Farrington died while in office.)
79th (1945–1947)	Joseph R. Farrington (R)
80th (1947–1949)	Joseph R. Farrington (R)
81st (1949–1951)	Joseph R. Farrington (R)
82nd (1951–1953)	Joseph R. Farrington (R)
83rd (1953–1955)	Joseph R. Farrington (R)
83rd (1953–1955)	Elizabeth P. Farrington (R)
84th (1955–1957)	Elizabeth P. Farrington (R)
85th (1957–1959)	John A. Burns (D)
86th (1959–1961)	John A. Burns (D)

=== Representatives from the State of Hawaii ===
Members of the House of Representatives are elected every two years by popular vote within a congressional district. From in the 86th Congress through the 91st Congress, both of Hawaii's representatives were elected from Hawaii's at-large congressional district, but in 1969, the Hawaii legislature passed a law creating Hawaii's first and second congressional district, which elected representatives to the 92nd Congress. The representatives from the two new districts, Patsy Mink and Spark Matsunaga, were also the last two representatives of the seats in the at-large district. Every ten years, the number of seats in the House apportioned to every state is recalculated based on the state's population as determined by the United States census. Hawaii had one seat until the 1960 United States census allotted Hawaii a second seat, which was first filled by Thomas Gill in the 1962 House elections.

Democratic (D) Republican (R)

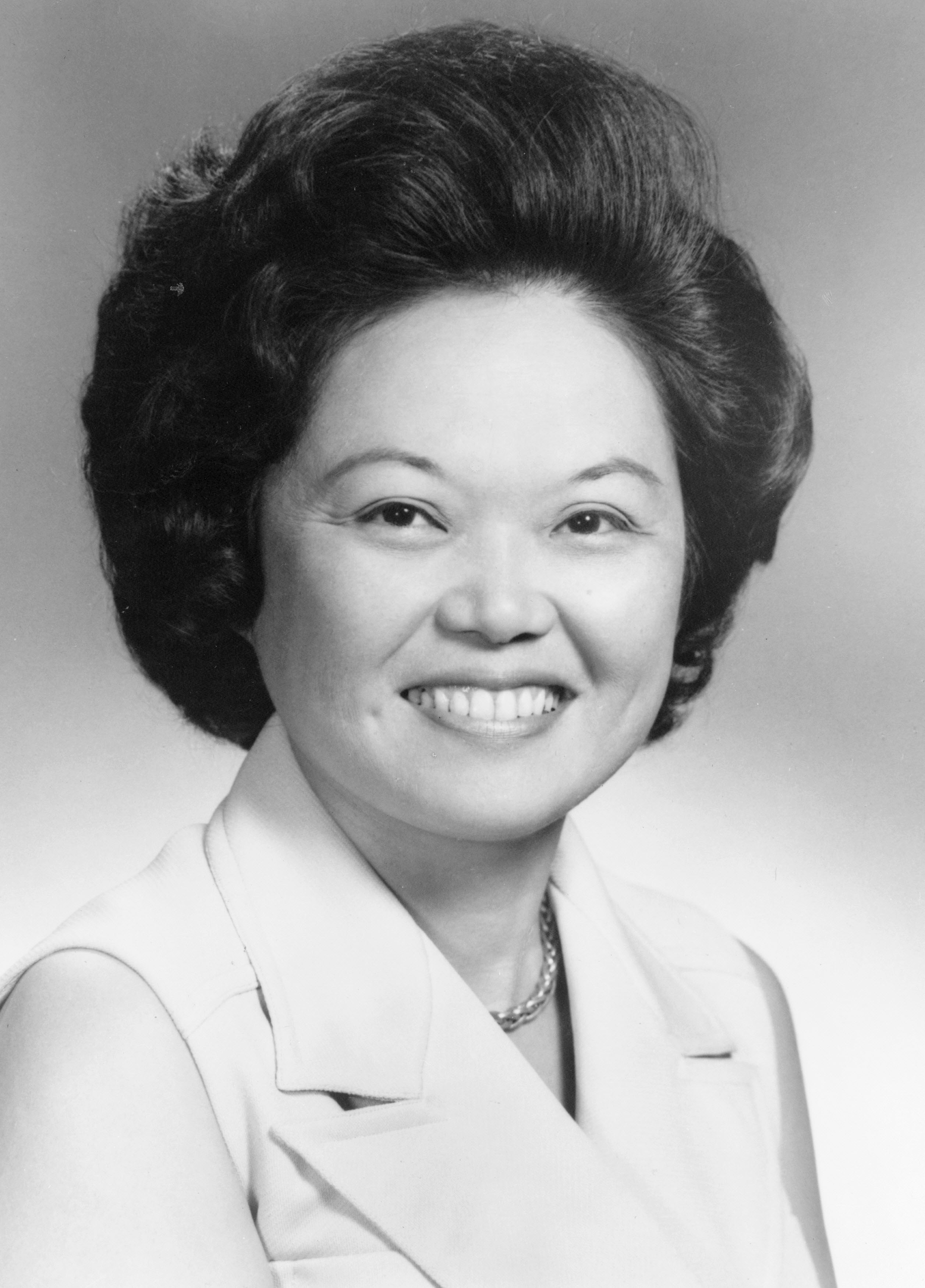
Patsy Mink, the first woman to represent Hawaii in the United States Congress, and the first woman of color to serve in the United States Congress from any state.

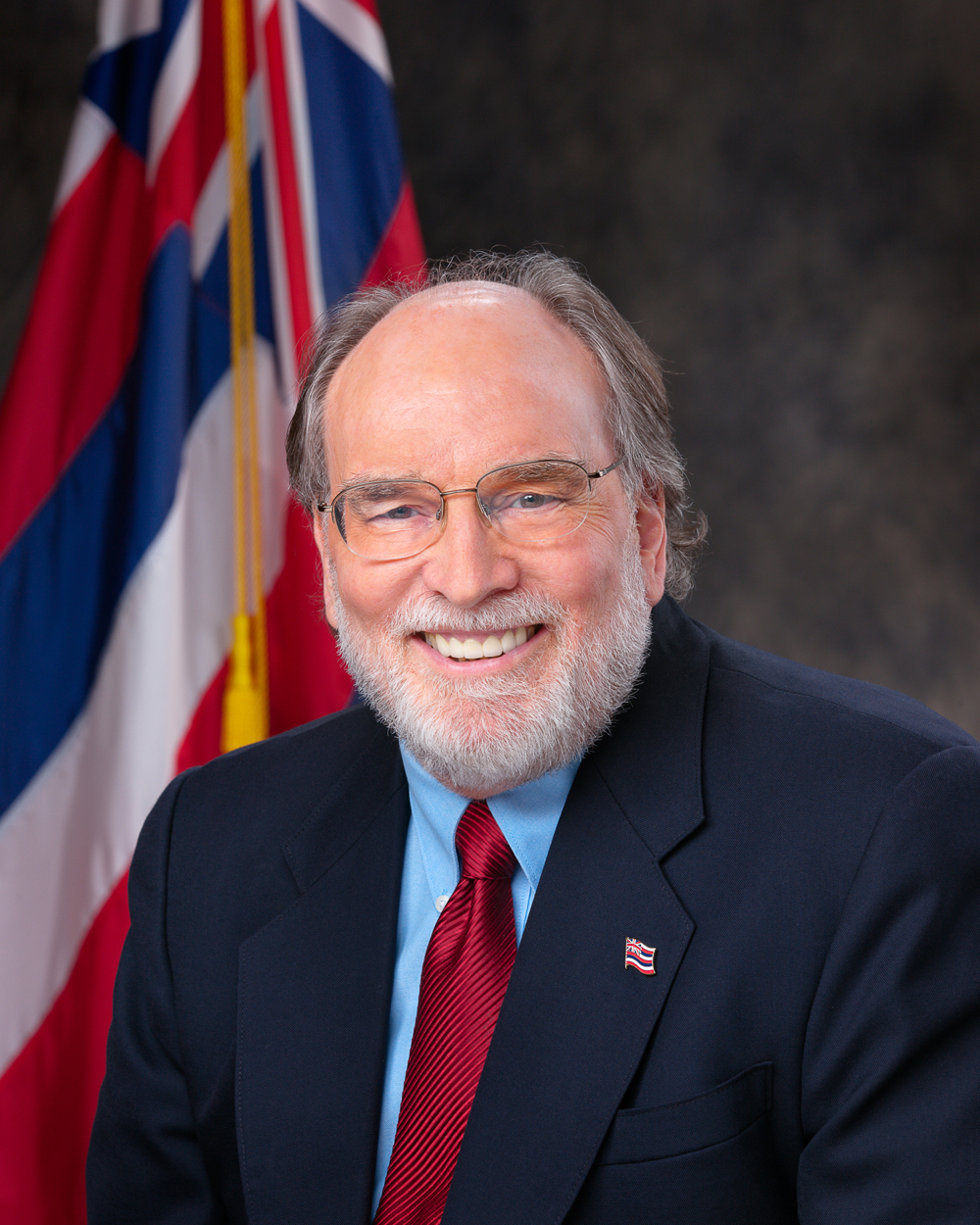
Neil Abercrombie, representative from Hawaii from 1986 to 1987 and from 1991 to 2010

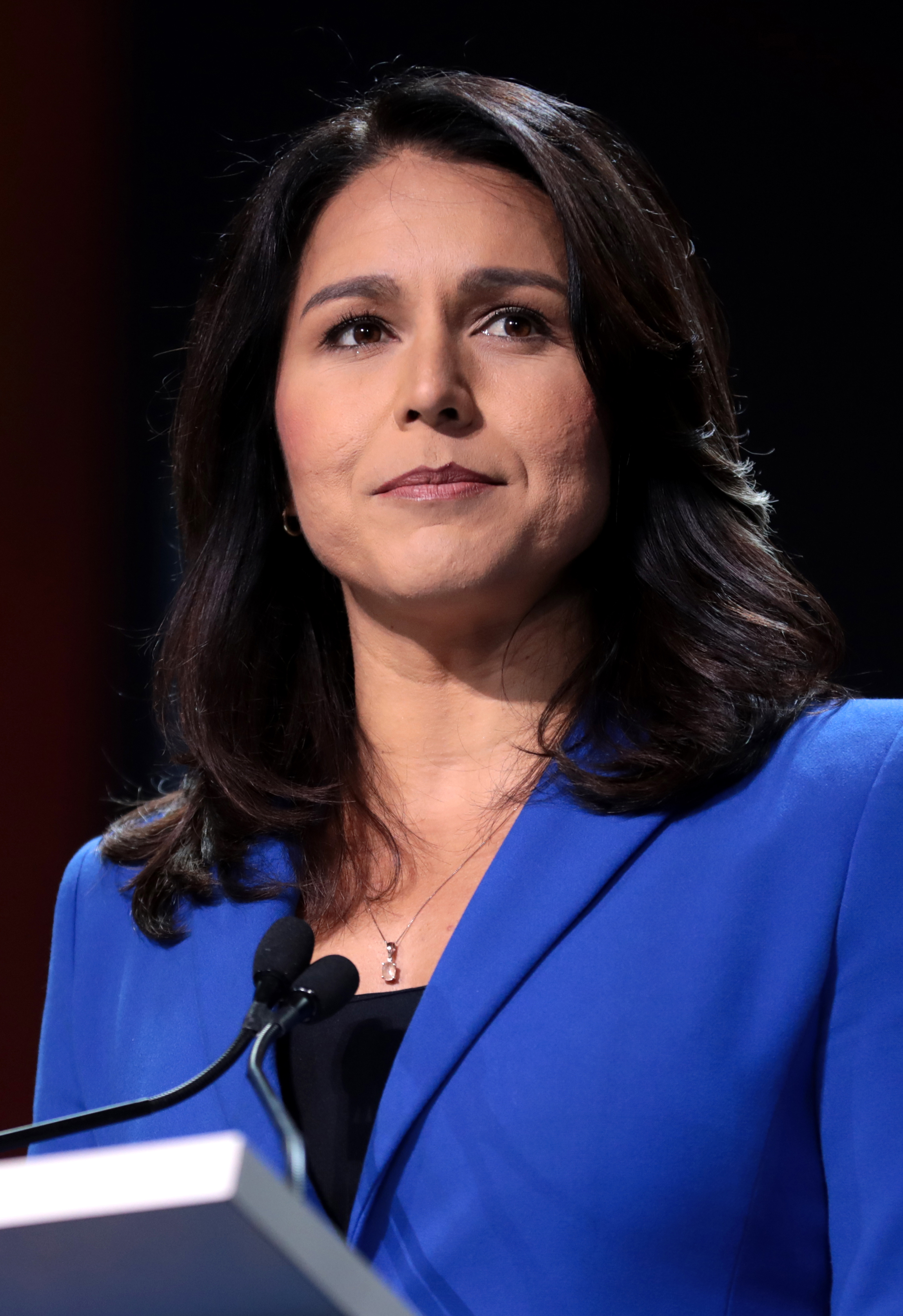
Tulsi Gabbard, representative from Hawaii and candidate during the 2020 Democratic presidential primaries

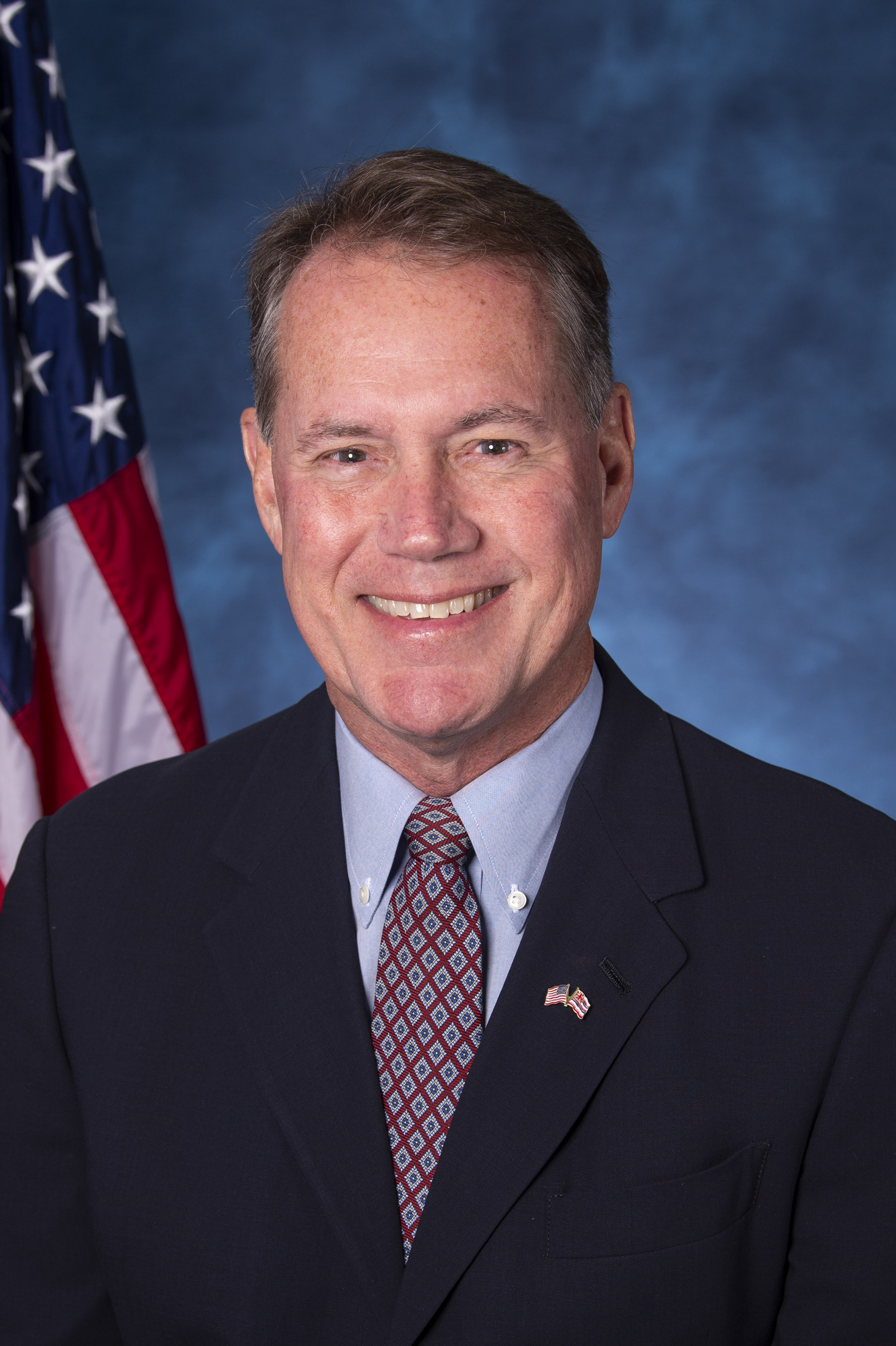
Ed Case, incumbent representative from Hawaii since 2019

Representatives from the State of Hawaii
Congress	District	
Congress	Seat A	Seat B
86th (1959–1961)	Daniel Inouye (D)	Seat B
87th (1961–1963)	Daniel Inouye (D)	Seat B
88th (1963–1965)	Spark Matsunaga (D)	Thomas Gill (D)
89th (1965–1967)	Spark Matsunaga (D)	Patsy Mink (D)
90th (1967–1969)	Spark Matsunaga (D)	Patsy Mink (D)
91st (1969–1971)	Spark Matsunaga (D)	Patsy Mink (D)
Congress	1st district	2nd district
92nd (1971–1973)	Spark Matsunaga (D)	Patsy Mink (D)
93rd (1973–1975)	Spark Matsunaga (D)	Patsy Mink (D)
94th (1975–1977)	Spark Matsunaga (D)	Patsy Mink (D)
95th (1977–1979)	Cecil Heftel (D) (Note: Representative Heftel resigned on July 11, 1986 to unsuccessfully run for Governor of Hawaii.)	Daniel Akaka (D) (Note: Representative Akaka resigned on May 16, 1990, to be appointed to the Senate seat vacated upon the death of Senator Spark Matsunaga.)
96th (1979–1981)	Cecil Heftel (D)	Daniel Akaka (D)
97th (1981–1983)	Cecil Heftel (D)	Daniel Akaka (D)
98th (1983–1985)	Cecil Heftel (D)	Daniel Akaka (D)
99th (1985–1987)	Cecil Heftel (D)	Daniel Akaka (D)
99th (1985–1987)	Neil Abercrombie (D) (Note: Because of the timing of Rep. Heftel's resignation, the special election to fill Heftel's seat and the primary for the seat's next election were held on the same day. Abercrombie won the special election to fill the seat through the current congressional session, but lost the primary for the general election that would be held in November, rendering him unable to run to finish the term.)	Daniel Akaka (D)
100th (1987–1989)	Pat Saiki (R)	Daniel Akaka (D)
101st (1989–1991)	Pat Saiki (R)	Daniel Akaka (D)
101st (1989–1991)	Pat Saiki (R)	Patsy Mink (D) (Note: Representative Mink died in office.)
102nd (1991–1993)	Neil Abercrombie (D) (Note: Representative Abercrombie resigned on February 28, 2010, to run for Governor of Hawaii.)	Patsy Mink (D)
103rd (1993–1995)	Neil Abercrombie (D)	Patsy Mink (D)
104th (1995–1997)	Neil Abercrombie (D)	Patsy Mink (D)
105th (1997–1999)	Neil Abercrombie (D)	Patsy Mink (D)
106th (1999–2001)	Neil Abercrombie (D)	Patsy Mink (D)
107th (2001–2003)	Neil Abercrombie (D)	Patsy Mink (D)
107th (2001–2003)	Neil Abercrombie (D)	Ed Case (D)
108th (2003–2005)	Neil Abercrombie (D)	Ed Case (D)
109th (2005–2007)	Neil Abercrombie (D)	Ed Case (D)
110th (2007–2009)	Neil Abercrombie (D)	Mazie Hirono (D)
111th (2009–2011)	Neil Abercrombie (D)	Mazie Hirono (D)
111th (2009–2011)	Charles Djou (R)	Mazie Hirono (D)
112th (2011–2013)	Colleen Hanabusa (D)	Mazie Hirono (D)
113th (2013–2015)	Colleen Hanabusa (D)	Tulsi Gabbard (D)
114th (2015–2017)	Mark Takai (D) (Note: Representative Takai died while in office.)	Tulsi Gabbard (D)
114th (2015–2017)	Colleen Hanabusa (D)	Tulsi Gabbard (D)
115th (2017–2019)	Colleen Hanabusa (D)	Tulsi Gabbard (D)
116th (2019–2021)	Ed Case (D)	Tulsi Gabbard (D)
117th (2021–2023)	Ed Case (D)	Kai Kahele (D)
118th (2023–2025)	Ed Case (D)	Jill Tokuda (D)
119th (2025–2027)	Ed Case (D)	Jill Tokuda (D)

== See also ==
- List of United States congressional districts
- Hawaii's congressional districts
- Political party strength in Hawaii
