= List of people executed in Hawaii =

Wikimedia list article

The following is a list of people executed in the present-day U.S. state of Hawaii. Capital punishment was abolished by Hawaii's territorial government in 1957, two years prior to Hawaii's admission to the United States in 1959. No executions have ever occurred in Hawaii as a U.S. state.

== Background ==
The only civilian method of execution in Hawaii was hanging, having been used by the Kingdom, Republic, and Territory. All executions listed below were carried out on O'ahu with the exception of six of the initial thirteen carried out locally between 1826 and 1841. Executions were first held within Fort Honolulu from 1840 to 1857, when a new primary prison known as Oahu Prison was completed. Executions were moved again in 1918 when the Territorial Prison, later known as the Oahu Community Correctional Center, was completed.

== List ==
Name	Ethnicity	Age	Date of execution	Present-day county	Crime	Victim(s)	Head of government
Thirteen individuals	?	?	1826–1841	Various (Note: 3 on Kaua'i, 7 on O'ahu, 2 on Maui, and 1 on Hawai'i.)	Murder	?	Kamehameha III
Kamanawa II	Hawaiian	55	October 20, 1840	Honolulu	Murder	Kamokuiki, 45, Hawaiian (Kamanawa II's wife)	Kamehameha III
Lonopuakau	Hawaiian	?	October 20, 1840	Honolulu	Murder	Kamokuiki, 45, Hawaiian (Kamanawa II's wife)	Kamehameha III
Ahulika	Hawaiian	?	August 14, 1846	Honolulu	Murder	Kawao, Hawaiian (Kaomali's husband)	Kamehameha III
Kaomali (Note: Only woman documented to have been legally executed in Hawaii.)	Hawaiian	?	August 14, 1846	Honolulu	Murder	Kawao, Hawaiian (Kaomali's husband)	Kamehameha III
Ayou	Chinese	?	November 6, 1856	Honolulu	Murder	Hoopii, Hawaiian	Kamehameha IV
Unknown	?	?	1857	?	Murder	?	Kamehameha IV
Pa'akaula	Hawaiian	?	April 5, 1867	Hawai'i	Murder	Henry Clark, American	Kamehameha V
Kahauliko	Hawaiian	?	April 5, 1867	Hawai'i	Murder	Henry Clark, American	Kamehameha V
Ho'oleawa'awa	Hawaiian	?	August 2, 1867	Kaua'i	Murder	Kalu, Hawaiian	Kamehameha V
Agnee	Chinese	?	April 9, 1869	Maui	Murder	Kaaueaina, Hawaiian	Kamehameha V
Tin Ah Chin	Chinese	?	April 9, 1869	Maui	Murder	Kaaueaina, Hawaiian	Kamehameha V
Kuheleaumoku	Hawaiian	28	March 21, 1873	Maui	Murder	Kanalo and Koukou, elderly, Hawaiian	Lunalilo
Kaaukai	Hawaiian	?	March 12, 1875	Hawai'i	Murder	Kanehunamoku, Hawaiian	Kalākaua
Unknown	?	?	1880	?	Murder	?	Kalākaua
Po'olua	Hawaiian	?	May 20, 1881	Hawai'i	Murder	His common-law wife, Hawaiian	Kalākaua
Unknown	?	?	1881	?	Murder	?	Kalākaua
Ah Hop	Chinese	?	March 5, 1889	Hawai'i	Murder	David Kapaha'e, Hawaiian	Kalākaua
Akana	Chinese	?	March 5, 1889	Hawai'i	Murder	Ah Sing, Chinese	Kalākaua
Woo Sau	Chinese	?	August 5, 1889	Hawai'i	Murder	Quon Yep, Chinese	Kalākaua
Noa	Hawaiian	?	December 13, 1897	Maui	Murder-Robbery	A storekeeper and his wife, Chinese	Sanford B. Dole (Note: Sole president of the Republic of Hawaii from 1894 to 1898 and first governor of the Territory of Hawaii from 1900 to 1903.)
Yoshida	Japanese	?	March 25, 1898	Maui	Murder	Oyasu, Japanese	Sanford B. Dole
Sagata Tsunkichi	Japanese	?	March 25, 1898	Maui	Murder	His wife Otsuru and their 3-year-old daughter, Japanese	Sanford B. Dole
Kapea	Hawaiian	20	April 11, 1898	Kaua'i	Murder	Dr. Jared K. Smith, American	Sanford B. Dole
Tanbara Gisburo	Japanese	21	August 14, 1903	N/A (Federal) (Note: Murder committed on the high seas.)	Murder	Capt. Jorgen J. Jacobsen, American	Sanford B. Dole
Jose Miranda	Puerto Rican	?	October 26, 1904	Honolulu	Murder	S. E. Damon, American	George R. Carter
Moritaro Matsumoto	Japanese	?	December 15, 1904	Kaua'i	Murder	G. H. Glennan, American	George R. Carter
Candido Soto	Puerto Rican	56	May 19, 1905	Kaua'i	Murder	Pasqual Hernandez, Puerto Rican	George R. Carter
Woo Miung Sook	Korean	?	May 23, 1906	Hawai'i	Murder	Pak Han No, Korean	George R. Carter
Kang Yong Bok	Korean	?	May 23, 1906	Hawai'i	Murder	Pak Han No, Korean	George R. Carter
Shim Miung Ok	Korean	?	May 23, 1906	Hawai'i	Murder	Pak Han No, Korean	George R. Carter
Frank Johnson	Irish	40+	May 31, 1906	Honolulu	Murder	Simeon Wharton, 7, American	George R. Carter
Okamoto	Japanese	?	June 28, 1906	Hawai'i	Murder	His wife, Japanese	George R. Carter
Lorenzo Colon	Puerto Rican	?	June 28, 1906	Hawai'i	Murder	His wife, Puerto Rican (Note: Reportedly murdered his own brother in Puerto Rico and served five years there for that crime.)	George R. Carter
Yi Hi Dam	Korean	?	June 21, 1909	Hawai'i	Murder	Yee Gee Tai, Korean	Walter F. Frear
Jozo Higashi	Japanese	25	October 28, 1909	Kaua'i	Murder	A woman	Walter F. Frear
Kanagawa	Japanese	24	February 3, 1910	Honolulu	Murder	His wife, Japanese	Walter F. Frear
Espridon Lahom	Filipino	22	February 14, 1911	Hawai'i	Murder	?	Walter F. Frear
Eigiro Nakamura	Japanese	26	January 16, 1912	Kaua'i	Murder	Tomatsu Kosugi, Japanese	Walter F. Frear
Hilao Bautista	Filipino	20	July 8, 1913	Honolulu	Murder-Robbery	Mue Kum Yee and Lum See, Chinese	Walter F. Frear
Domingo Rodrigues	Filipino	20	July 8, 1913	Honolulu	Murder-Robbery	Mue Kum Yee and Lum See, Chinese	Walter F. Frear
Miguel Manigbas	Filipino	19	July 8, 1913	Honolulu	Murder-Robbery	Mue Kum Yee and Lum See, Chinese	Walter F. Frear
Simplicio Javellana	Filipino	22	April 7, 1914	Hawai'i	Murder	Antonia Pastora, Filipina	Lucius E. Pinkham
Pak Sur Chi	Korean	38	June 25, 1915	Honolulu	Murder	Kim Pak Chi Sur, Korean (wife)	Lucius E. Pinkham
Ponciano Golaste	Filipino	26	October 15, 1915	Kaua'i	Murder-Burglary	Wada, Japanese	Lucius E. Pinkham
Feliciano Hirano	Filipino	21	October 15, 1915	Kaua'i	Murder-Burglary	Wada, Japanese	Lucius E. Pinkham
Juan Coronel	Filipino	22	October 15, 1915	Kaua'i	Murder-Burglary	Wada, Japanese	Lucius E. Pinkham
Yee Kelik Yo	Korean	?	January 26, 1917	Honolulu	Murder	Chee Wen Yer, Korean	Lucius E. Pinkham
Florencia Bonelia	Filipino	24	October 26, 1917	Honolulu	Murder-Robbery	Tsunetaro Hayashibara, Japanese	Lucius E. Pinkham
Gabriel Verver	Filipino	35	October 26, 1917	Honolulu	Murder-Robbery	Tsunetaro Hayashibara, Japanese	Lucius E. Pinkham
C. Dojoylongsol	Filipino	?	November 16, 1917	Honolulu	Murder	Victorina Domatay, Filipina	Lucius E. Pinkham
Antonio Garcia	Filipino	33	November 30, 1917	Hawai'i	Murder	A Japanese man (Note: Also murdered Harriet Kunane (16, Hawaiian) at Kohala.)	Lucius E. Pinkham
Senkichi Ichioka	Japanese	61	June 2, 1921	Kaua'i	Murder	Tamiko Tanaka, 13, Japanese	Charles J. McCarthy
Cleofe Ruiz	Puerto Rican	38	October 26, 1923	Honolulu	Murder	James K. Koenaona, 43, Hawaiian (police officer) (Note: Serving a 20-to-life sentence for second-degree murder committed at Makawao, Maui, and escaped prison at time of crime after mistaking a dismissed writ of error for a death warrant.)	Wallace Rider Farrington
Marcelo Rivera	Filipino	23	May 27, 1927	Kaua'i	Murder	Mrs. Gregorio Liacona, Filipina	Wallace Rider Farrington
Narciso Reyes	Filipino	34	May 27, 1927	?	Murder	?	Wallace Rider Farrington
Lacambra Santiago	Filipino	26	August 12, 1927	?	Murder	?	Wallace Rider Farrington
Pilipi Austero	Filipino	38	August 12, 1927	?	Murder	?	Wallace Rider Farrington
Vincente Kagal	Filipino	32	March 2, 1929	?	Murder	Robita Dayaganon, Filipina	Wallace Rider Farrington
Myles Y. J. Fukunaga	Japanese	19	November 19, 1929	Honolulu	Murder-Kidnap	George Gill Jamieson, 10, American	Lawrence M. Judd
Lazaro Calibo	Filipino	23	July 28, 1932	Hawai'i	Murder	Emily Bonella, 15, Filipina (love interest)	Lawrence M. Judd
Leoncio Encio	Filipino	37	July 15, 1933	?	Murder	?	Lawrence M. Judd
Risalino Tabiolo	Filipino	23	November 1, 1933	?	Murder	?	Lawrence M. Judd
Solomon Mahoe	Hawaiian	32	August 5, 1937	Honolulu	Murder	Robert Massaki Imamura, 21, Japanese (Note: Also murdered Francisco Gumahad (36, Filipino) and Yoshiko Yamashiro (11, Japanese) during the same crime.)	Joseph Poindexter
Mateo Quiniones	Filipino	44	May 27, 1940	Hawai'i	Murder	Vincente Baroy, Filipino (Note: Also murdered a second person during the crime.)	Joseph Poindexter
Mariano Flores	Filipino	54	September 19, 1941	Hawai'i	Murder	Rosita Flores, 14, Filipina-Hawaiian (daughter)	Joseph Poindexter
Anaclito Gagarin	Filipino	37	October 24, 1941	Honolulu	Murder	Estol Lannom, Filipino	Joseph Poindexter
Adriano Domingo	Filipino	33	January 7, 1944	Kaua'i	Murder-Rape	Helen R. Sakamoto, 21, Japanese	Ingram Stainback

== Demographics ==
Ethnicity
Unknown	16	20%
Chinese	6	8%
Filipino	24	30%
Hawaiian	13	16%
Irish	1	1%
Japanese	10	13%
Korean	6	8%
Puerto Rican	4	5%
Age
Unknown	43	54%
17–19	2	3%
20–29	18	23%
30–39	11	14%
40–49	2	3%
50–59	3	4%
60–69	1	1%
Gender
Male	79	99%
Female	1	1%
Date of execution
1826–1841	13	16%
1840–1849	4	5%
1850–1859	2	3%
1860–1869	5	6%
1870–1879	2	3%
1880–1889	6	8%
1890–1899	4	5%
1900–1909	12	15%
1910–1919	16	20%
1920–1929	8	10%
1930–1939	4	5%
1940–1949	4	5%
Method
Hanging	80	100%
Head of government
Kamehameha III	17	21%
Kamehameha IV	2	3%
Kamehameha V	5	6%
Lunalilo	1	1%
Kalākaua	7	9%
Sanford B. Dole	5	6%
George R. Carter	9	11%
Walter F. Frear	8	10%
Lucius E. Pinkham	10	13%
Charles J. McCarthy	1	1%
Wallace Rider Farrington	6	8%
Lawrence M. Judd	4	5%
Joseph Poindexter	4	5%
Ingram Stainback	1	1%

== See also ==
- Capital punishment in Hawaii
- Crime in Hawaii
