= Arthur G. Smith =

American lawyer and Attorney General of Hawaii (born 1882)

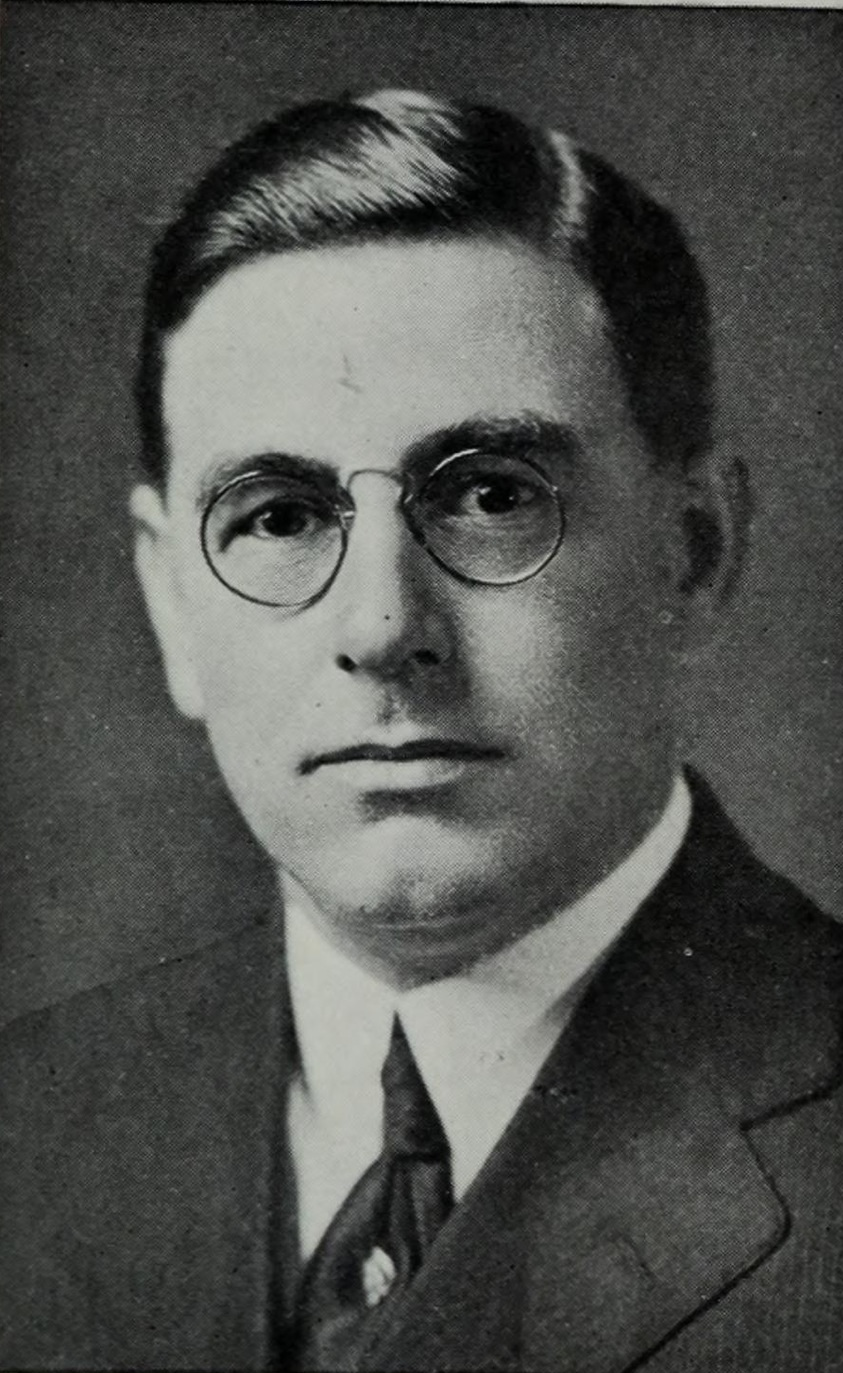

Attorney General of the Territory of Hawaii
- In office April 18, 1918 – August 30, 1918
- Governor: Lucius E. Pinkham; Charles J. McCarthy
- Preceded by: Ingram M. Stainback
- Succeeded by: Harry Irwin

Personal details
- Born: Arthur George Smith Tenants Harbor, Maine, U.S.
- Education: Colby College; Harvard College (A.B., LL.B.)
- Profession: Lawyer, public official

Arthur George Smith was an American lawyer and public official who served as the Attorney General of the Territory of Hawaii in 1918 and co-founded the Honolulu law firm that became Cades Schutte.

== Early life and education ==
Smith was born in 1882 in Tenants Harbor, Maine. He attended the Coburn Classical Institute in Waterville, Maine, before studying at Colby College. He later transferred to Harvard University, graduating with the Class of 1905, and earned his law degree from Harvard Law School. He was admitted to the Massachusetts Bar in 1908.

== Career ==
=== Territorial government ===
After relocating to the Territory of Hawaii, Smith entered public service in Honolulu. He served as Deputy Attorney General of Hawaii from November 1, 1910, until March 1918. During his tenure as deputy, he also served on the territorial Water Commission (1915–1917) and as Judge Advocate for the Hawaii National Guard in 1917.

On April 18, 1918, Smith was appointed Attorney General of the Territory of Hawaii, succeeding Ingram M. Stainback and serving concurrently on the territorial Board of Health. He held the post under Governors Lucius E. Pinkham and Charles J. McCarthy until August 30, 1918, when he was succeeded by Harry Irwin.

Legal offices
Preceded by Ingram M. Stainback	Attorney General of the Territory of Hawaii; 1918	Succeeded by Harry Irwin
