= Charles Henry Rose =

American politician

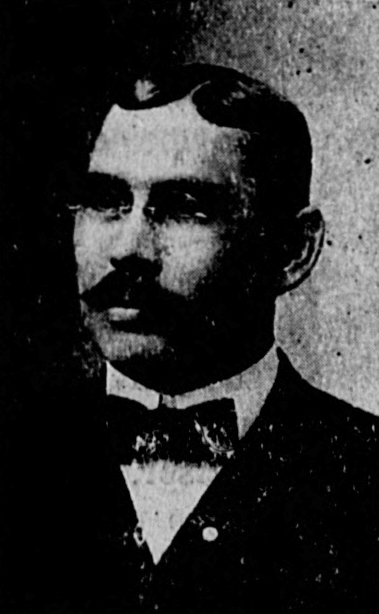
- Born: November 4, 1873; Honolulu, Hawaii
- Died: January 15, 1948 (aged 74)
- Police career
- Country: city police
- Allegiance: United States
- Department: Honolulu Police Department
- Service years: 16
- Rank: Sheriff

Charles Henry Rose (November 4, 1873 – January 15, 1948) was Sheriff of the Honolulu Police Department (modern equivalent to Chief of Police).

== Early life ==
Charles Henry Rose was born on November 4, 1873, in Honolulu, Hawaii to Charles Henry Rose and Mary A. Sylva. He attended Saint Louis School. In 1889 Rose began work at Wilder Steamship Company as an office boy and moved up to passenger agent. He married Rosie M. Senna in 1899.

== Police ==
In 1907 Rose was appointed by Sheriff Curtis P. Iaukea as Chief Clerk of the Honolulu Police Department. He was elected Deputy Sheriff in 1908 for two terms. Rose became Sheriff of Honolulu in 1914, appointed by Sheriff William P. Jarrett to succeed him between elections, while Jarrett was promoted to High Sheriff of the Territory of Hawaii. Rose gave ex-mayor Joseph Fern a job after leaving office in 1915 by appointing him City Jailer. Rose remained Sheriff until 1923, through World War I. He had been a Democrat and was elected third district Senator in the Hawaii Territorial Senate in 1925.

Government offices
Preceded by William P. Jarrett	Sheriff of Honolulu; 1915 - 1923	Succeeded by David K. Trask
