= Lincoln L. McCandless =

US politician (1859–1940)

Lincoln Loy McCandless
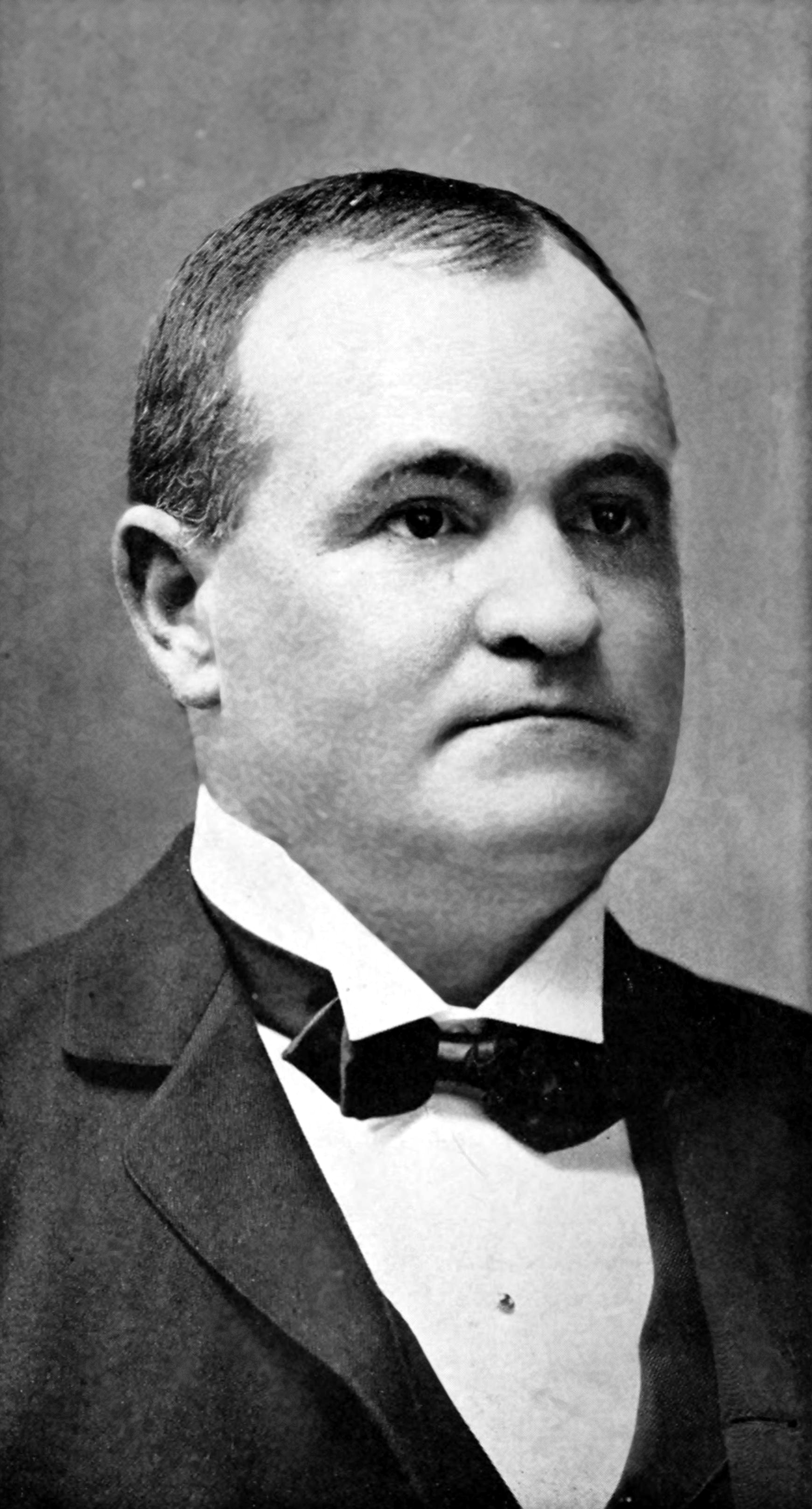

Delegate to the U.S. House of Representatives from Hawaii Territory's at-large district
- In office March 4, 1933 – January 3, 1935
- Preceded by: Victor S. K. Houston
- Succeeded by: Samuel Wilder King

Personal details
- Born: September 18, 1859 Indiana, Pennsylvania
- Died: October 5, 1940 (aged 81) Honolulu, Territory of Hawaii
- Party: Republican; Democratic

Lincoln Loy McCandless (September 18, 1859 – October 5, 1940) was a United States cattle rancher, industrialist and politician for the Territory of Hawaii. McCandless served in the United States Congress as a territorial delegate. A former member of the Hawaii Republican Party, McCandless was one of the earliest leaders of the Hawaii Democratic Party.

== Life ==
Born September 18, 1859, in Indiana, Pennsylvania, his mother was Eliza Ann Newman and father Thomas McCartney McCandless. McCandless grew up in Volcano, West Virginia. McCandless moved to Hawaii in 1882 to employ his expertise in oil drilling and mining to construct artesian wells. He joined his older brothers James S. McCandless (born 1855) who had arrived in 1880, and John A. McCandless (born 1853) who had arrived in 1881, forming the McCandless Brothers family firm. On May 24, 1904, he married Elizabeth Janet Cartwright of New York.

McCandless entered political life as a member of the Republic of Hawaii House of Representatives from the 5th district from 1898 to 1900. After the United States annexed the islands to form the Territory of Hawaii, McCandless was elected to the territorial legislature as a senator from 1902 to 1906. He started his career in the Hawaii Republican Party. But by 1906, he started to challenge the long-serving Prince Jonah Kūhiō Kalaniana'ole.

By 1908 McCandless switched to join the Hawaii Democratic Party to oppose Kūhiō as non-voting delegate to the United States House of Representatives for Hawaii Territory's at-large congressional district, He was also nominated in 1910, and in 1912, losing all those elections, but Democrat William Paul Jarrett was nominated and won the elections in 1922 and 1924. McCandless was nominated and won the election on November 8, 1932, and served one term from March 4, 1933, to January 3, 1935. Losing a bid for reelection, McCandless directed the construction of roads, buildings, and a sewer system for Honolulu. He died in Honolulu, on October 5, 1940, and was cremated and interred in Oahu Cemetery in the Nuʻuanu Valley.

U.S. House of Representatives
Preceded by Victor Stewart Kaleoaloha Houston	Delegate to the U.S. House of Representatives from Hawaii Territory's at-large congressional district March 4, 1933 – January 3, 1935	Succeeded by Samuel Wilder King
