= Macklin Fleming =

American jurist

- Born: Ingram Macklin Stainback Jr. September 6, 1911; Chicago, Illinois
- Died: May 27, 2010 (aged 98); West Los Angeles, California
- Education: Yale Law School
- Occupation: Judge
- Father: Ingram Stainback

Macklin Fleming (September 6, 1911 – May 27, 2010) was an American jurist who served as an associate justice on the California Court of Appeal, covering the Second Appellate District, Division 2, from 1964 until his retirement in 1981. He previously served as a judge on the Los Angeles Superior Court from 1959 to 1964.
