= Attorney General Poindexter =

Attorney General Poindexter may refer to:

- George Poindexter (1779–1853), Territorial Attorney General of Mississippi
- Joseph Poindexter (1869–1951), Attorney General of Montana
