= Charles A. Stainback =

American politician

- Born: December 25, 1878; Somerville, Tennessee, U.S.
- Died: 1961 (aged 82–83)
- Education: Vanderbilt University Law School
- Occupation: Politician
- Relatives: Ingram Stainback (brother)

Charles Ashley Stainback (December 25, 1878 – 1961) was an American lawyer and politician. He served as a Democratic member of the Tennessee Senate. He was a segregationist.

== Early life ==
Charles Ashley Stainback was born on December 25, 1878, in Somerville, Tennessee. His father, Charles A. Stainback Sr, was a lawyer and state legislator, and his brother, Ingram Stainback, served the ninth Territorial Governor of Hawaii.

Stainback served as a corporal in the U. S. Army during the Spanish-American War. Stainback graduated from the Vanderbilt University Law School in 1901.

== Career ==
Stainback became a lawyer in Somerville. He joined the Democratic Party, and attended the Democratic National Convention four times. He represented Fayette and Lawrence Counties in the Tennessee House of Representatives between 1904 and 1912.

Stainback served as a member of the Tennessee Senate. In 1955, he sponsored a bill to prevent the desegregation of public schools in Nashville in spite of Brown v. Board of Education. Officially, the bill was meant to prevent social unrest. However, Stainback admitted that was a covert way to "preserve segregation." The bill was vetoed by Democratic Governor Frank G. Clement.

Stainback served on the advisory board of the Tennessee Federation for Constitutional Government.

== Death ==
Stainback died in 1961.
