= Joseph R. Farrington =

American politician (1897–1954)

Joseph Rider Farrington
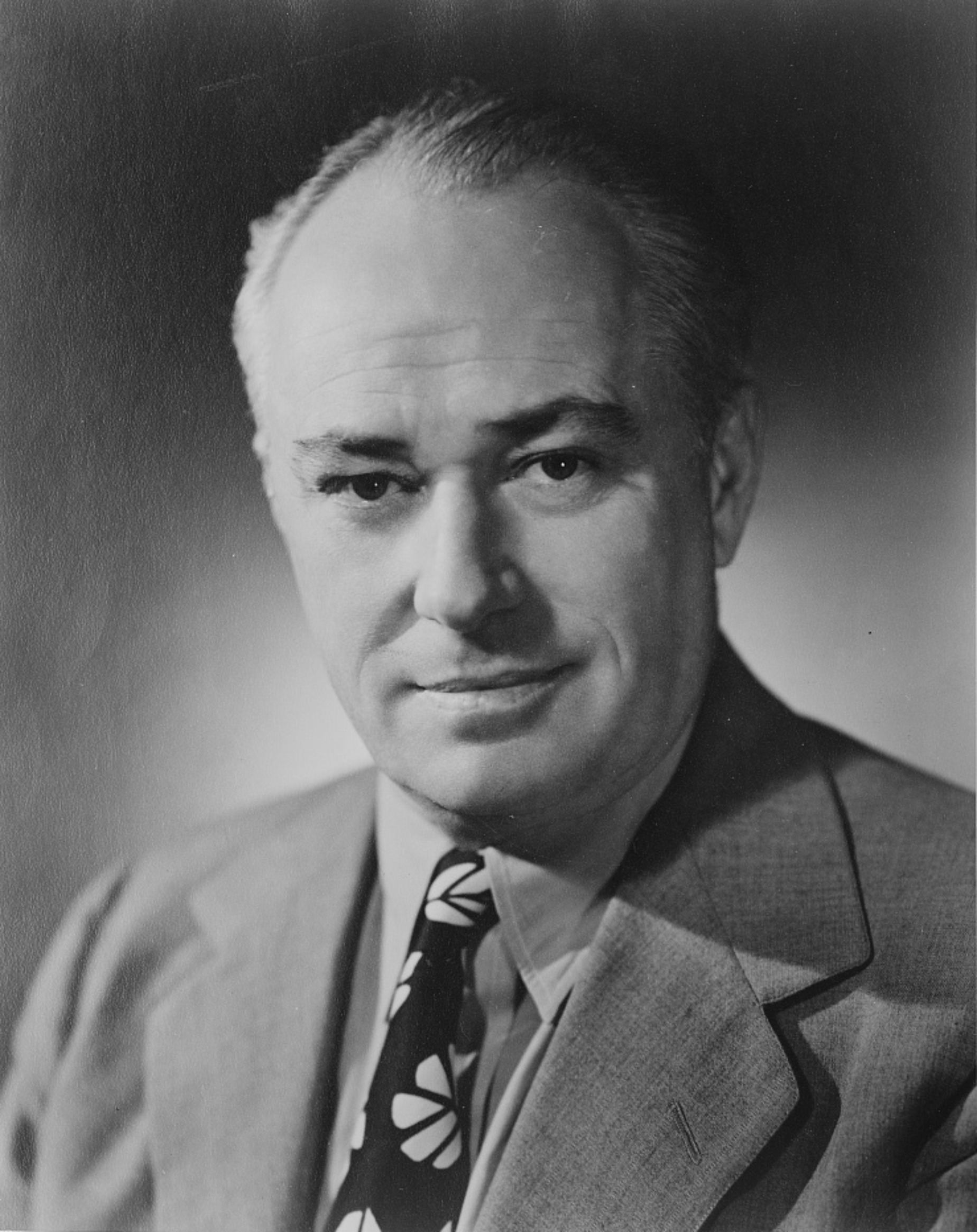
- Farrington in 1943

Delegate to the U.S. House of Representatives from Hawaii Territory's At-large district
- In office January 3, 1943 – June 19, 1954
- Preceded by: Samuel W. King
- Succeeded by: Elizabeth P. Farrington

Member of the Hawaii Territorial Senate
- In office 1934–1942

Personal details
- Born: October 15, 1897 Washington, D.C., U.S.
- Died: June 19, 1954 (aged 56) Washington, D.C., U.S.
- Party: Republican
- Spouse: Elizabeth P. Farrington

Military service
- Allegiance: United States
- Branch/service: United States Army
- Years of service: 1918–1919
- Rank: second lieutenant

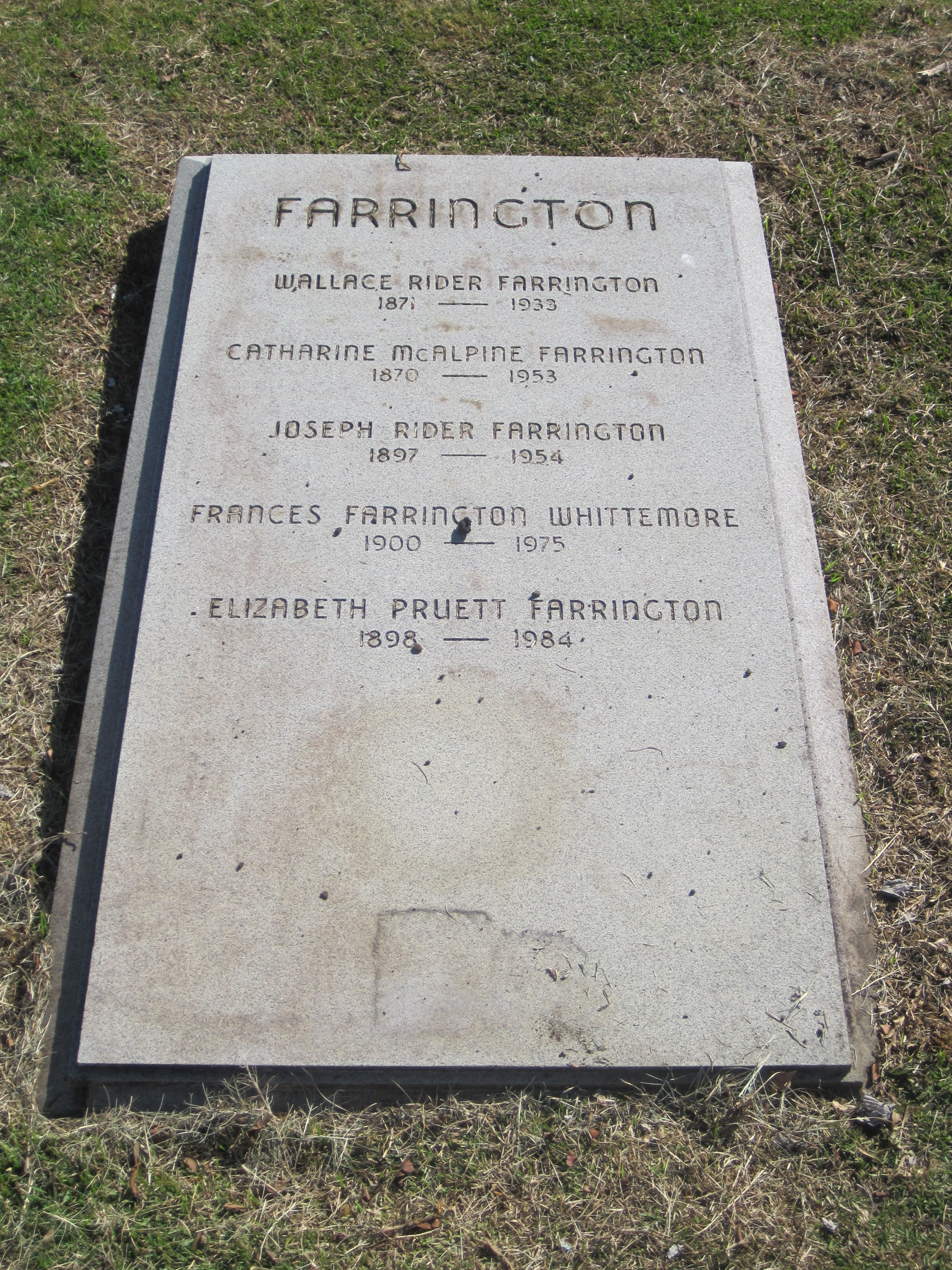
Farrington grave marker in Oahu Cemetery

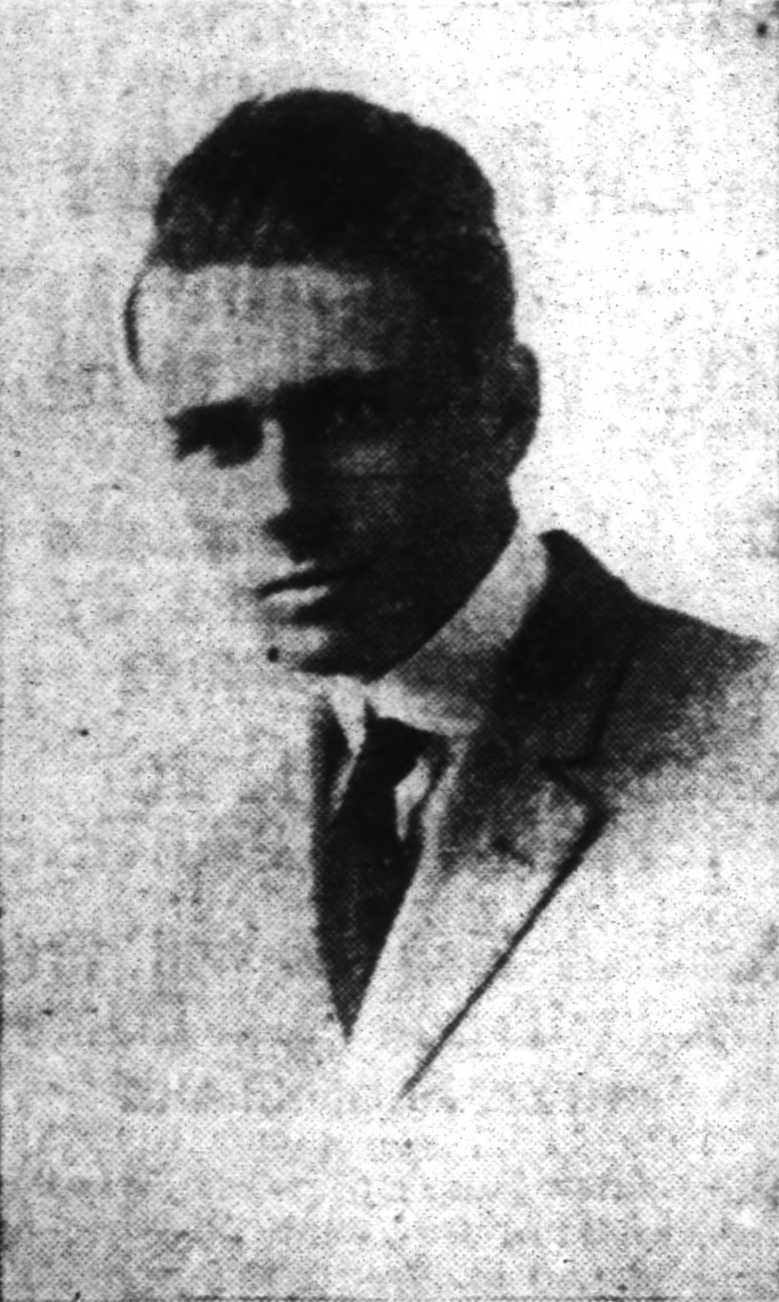
Farrington in 1915, as a graduate from Punahou School.

Joseph Rider Farrington (October 15, 1897 – June 19, 1954) was an American newspaper editor and statesman who served in the United States Congress as delegate for the Territory of Hawai'i.

== Education and military career ==
Farrington was born in Washington, D.C., to Wallace Rider Farrington, the future Territorial Governor of Hawai'i. While still an infant, he moved to Honolulu, Hawai'i with his parents where his father began work as an editor for the Honolulu Advertiser and later the Honolulu Star-Bulletin newspapers. Farrington attended Punahou School and, upon graduating, studied at the University of Wisconsin. He dropped out of college in June 1918 to enlist in the United States Army. He was commissioned a second lieutenant of field artillery in September 1918 and discharged the following December. He returned to the University of Wisconsin–Madison and graduated in 1919.

== Newspaper career ==
As soon as he obtained his degree in Wisconsin, Farrington became a reporter on the staff of the Public Ledger in Philadelphia. He served three years as a member of its Washington bureau. He then returned to Honolulu to follow in his father's footsteps and entered the newspaper business. He became a reporter and then editor of the Honolulu Star-Bulletin. In 1939, Farrington succeeded his father to become president and general manager of the Honolulu Star-Bulletin, an office in which he served until his death.

== Political career ==
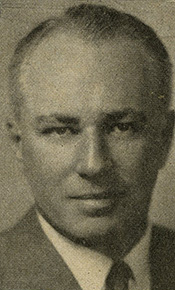
Farrington during his time as delegate.

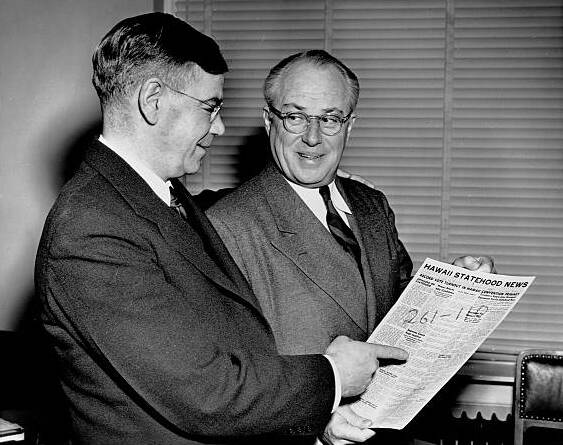
Farrington with Alaska Delegate Bob Bartlett in 1950.

Farrington began a part-time political career as secretary to the Hawai'i Legislative Commission in 1933. The following year he was elected to the Hawaii Territorial Senate, an office he served in through 1942. On January 3, 1943, Farrington was sworn in as a Republican delegate to Congress. Farrington was a supporter of Hawaiian statehood and help advise the early post-war efforts for admission. He died in office in Washington, D.C., on June 19, 1954, of an apparent heart attack. His wife, Elizabeth P. Farrington, was elected to replace him in Congress. Farrington was buried in the Oahu Cemetery in Nuʻuanu Valley in Honolulu.

== See also ==
- List of members of the United States Congress who died in office (1950–1999)

U.S. House of Representatives
Preceded by Samuel Wilder King	Delegate to the U.S. House of Representatives from Hawaii Territory's at-large congressional district January 3, 1943 - June 19, 1954	Succeeded by Elizabeth P. Farrington
