= Elizabeth P. Farrington =

American journalist (1898–1984)

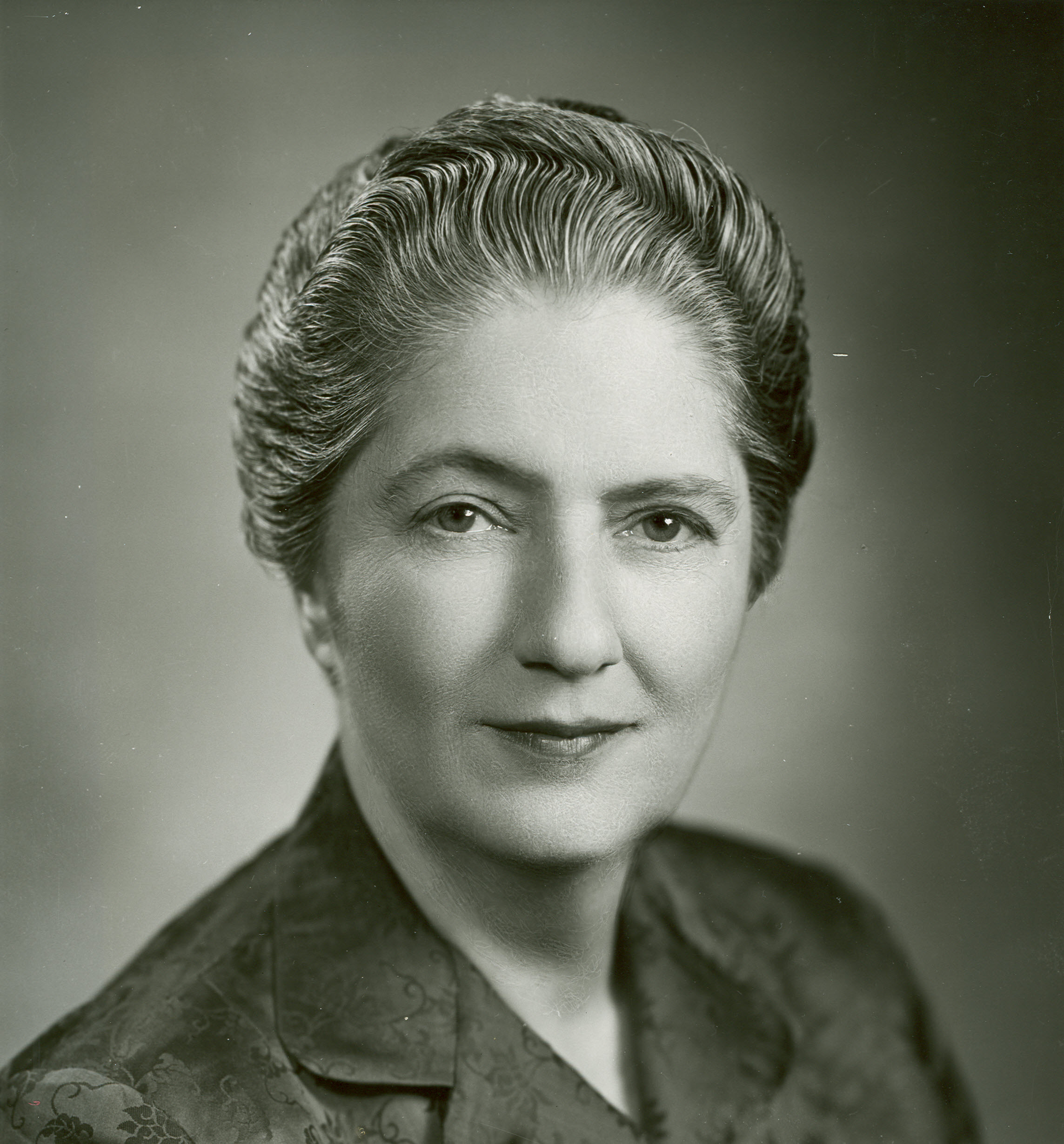

Delegate to the U.S. House of Representatives from Hawaii Territory's At-large district
- In office August 4, 1954 – January 3, 1957
- Preceded by: Joseph R. Farrington
- Succeeded by: John A. Burns

President of the National Federation of Republican Women
- In office 1949–1952
- Preceded by: Peggy Green
- Succeeded by: Nora Kearns

Personal details
- Born: Mary Elizabeth Pruett; May 30, 1898 Tokyo, Empire of Japan
- Died: July 21, 1984 (aged 86) Honolulu, Hawaii, U.S.
- Party: Republican
- Spouse: Joseph R. Farrington

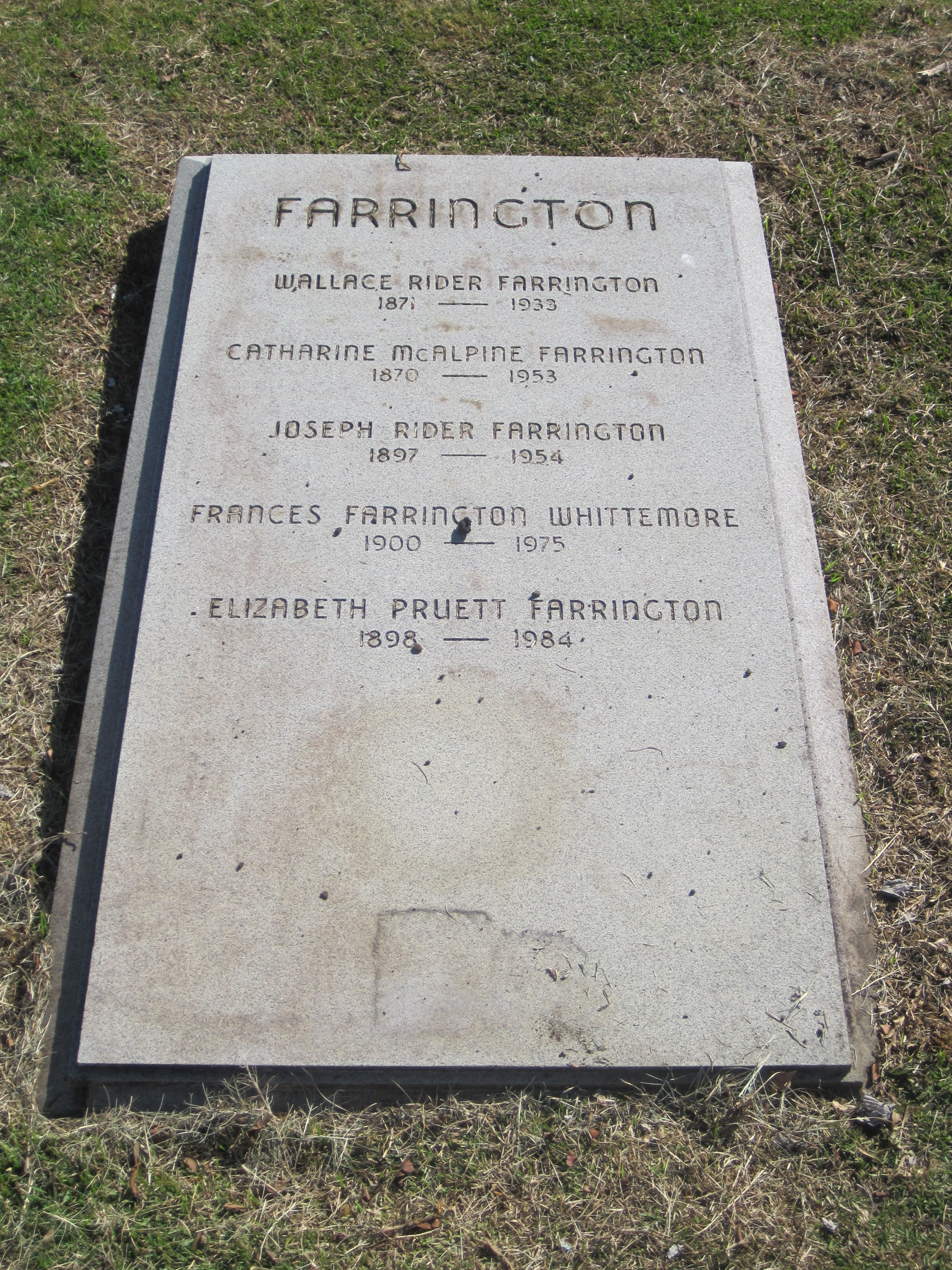
Farrington grave marker in Oahu Cemetery

Mary Elizabeth Pruett Farrington (May 30, 1898 – July 21, 1984), more commonly known as Elizabeth P. Farrington, was publisher of the Honolulu Star-Bulletin and an American politician who served as delegate to the United States Congress for the Territory of Hawai'i. She was the wife to Joseph Rider Farrington, whom she had succeeded in Washington, D.C. Her father-in-law was the Territorial Governor of Hawai'i Wallace Rider Farrington.

== Early life ==
Farrington was born in Tokyo on May 30, 1898; her parents were Robert and Josie Pruett, who were Christian missionaries from Tennessee. She attended Tokyo Foreign School before moving back to the United States. She attended grammar schools in Nashville, Tennessee, El Paso, Texas, and Los Angeles, California. After graduating from Hollywood High School, Farrington obtained a degree from Ward-Belmont Junior College of Nashville in 1916. She went on to study journalism at the University of Wisconsin-Madison, where she met her husband. She graduated from Wisconsin in 1918. Newly married, she settled in Honolulu. She became a newspaper correspondent for the Honolulu Star-Bulletin through 1957.

She and her husband adopted two children.

== Political career ==
Farrington was elected President of the League of Republican Women, an office she served in Washington, D.C., from 1946 to 1948. She was then elected to the National Federation of Women's Republican Clubs and served as its president from 1949 to 1953. In 1952, Farrington was a delegate for the Territory of Hawai'i to the Republican National Convention that nominated Dwight Eisenhower to become President of the United States.

Farrington was elected to the United States Congress in a special election to fill a vacancy left by her husband's unexpected death. She was subsequently re-elected to a term in her own right, and served from July 31, 1954, to January 3, 1957. In 1956, she lost her bid for re-election to a third term in Congress and returned to her family's newspaper business in Honolulu. She was the first woman elected to represent Hawaii in any capacity (territory or state) in the U.S. Congress.

== Newspaper career ==
Farrington succeeded her husband's office as publisher, president and director of Honolulu Star-Bulletin. She served in those capacities from 1946 to 1961. She concurrently served as director and chairman of the Honolulu Lithograph Company, Limited and president of the Hawaiian Broadcasting System, Limited. She made a brief return to politics when President of the United States Richard Nixon appointed her to be the Director of the Office of Territories of the United States Department of the Interior. After completing her term she retired to Honolulu where she died on July 21, 1984. Her ashes were interred at O'ahu Cemetery.

== See also ==
- Women in the United States House of Representatives

U.S. House of Representatives
Preceded by Joseph Rider Farrington	Delegate to the U.S. House of Representatives from Hawaii Territory's at-large congressional district August 4, 1954 – January 3, 1957	Succeeded by John Anthony Burns
