= Wallace Rider Farrington =

American politician (1871–1933)

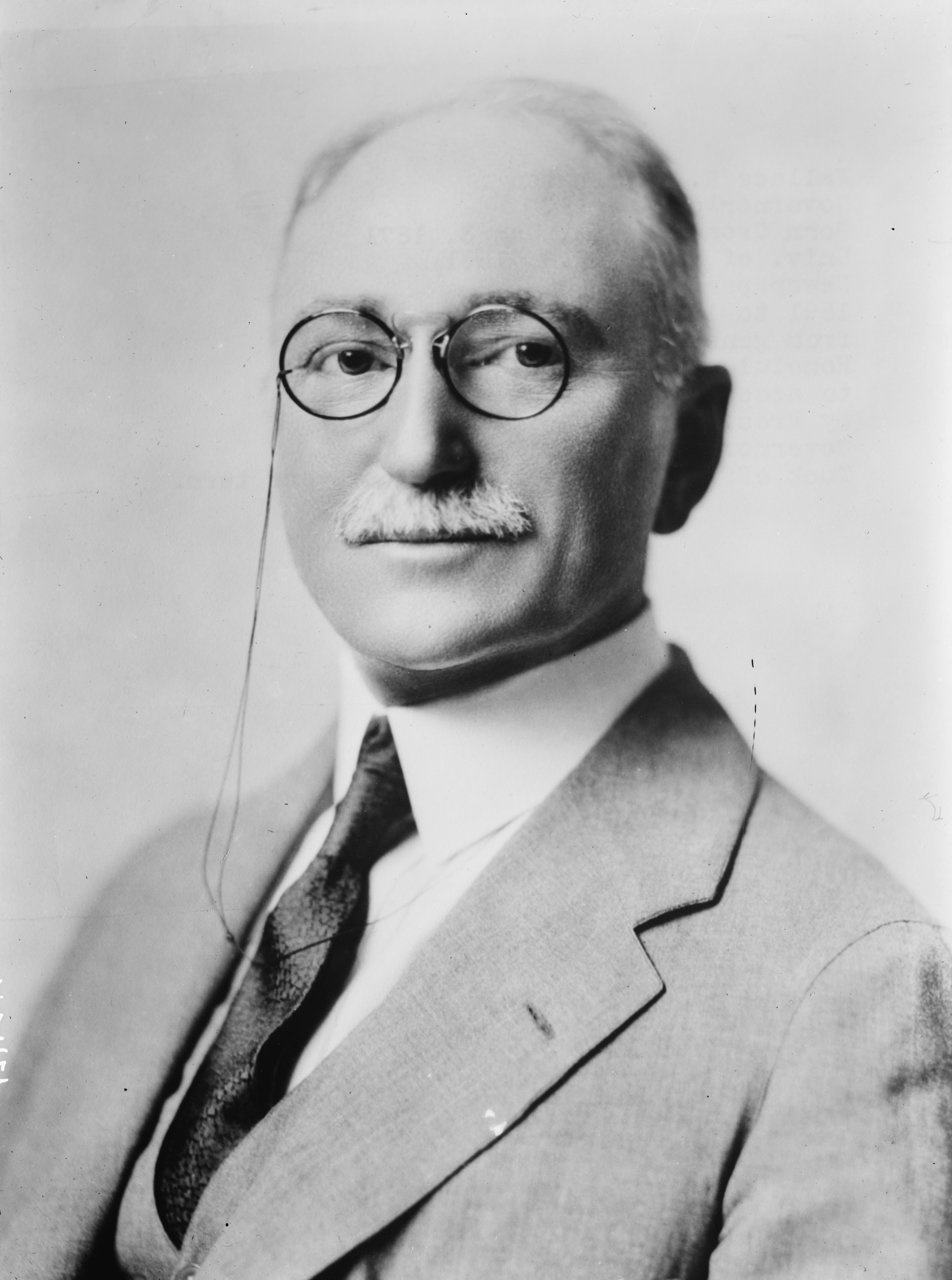

6th Territorial Governor of Hawaii
- In office July 5, 1921 – July 6, 1929
- Appointed by: Warren G. Harding
- Preceded by: Charles J. McCarthy
- Succeeded by: Lawrence M. Judd

Mayor of Honolulu

Personal details
- Born: May 3, 1871 Orono, Maine, U.S.
- Died: October 6, 1933 (aged 62) Territory of Hawaii
- Party: Republican
- Spouse: Catharine McAlpine
- Children: Joseph Rider Farrington
- Occupation: Journalist

Wallace Rider Farrington (May 3, 1871 – October 6, 1933) was an American journalist who served as the sixth Territorial Governor of Hawaii, serving from 1921 to 1929. Prior to his term, he was editor of The Honolulu Advertiser and Honolulu Star-Bulletin newspapers.

== Life ==
Farrington was born in Orono on May 3, 1871. He graduated the University of Maine in 1891. An avid traveler, he found himself in Honolulu, Hawaiʻi in 1894 and was persuaded to stay to become the editor of the Honolulu Advertiser. He left the newspaper after three years of service to become the editor of the Honolulu Star-Bulletin. Interested in local politics, he was elected Mayor of Honolulu.

In 1915, Farrington organized the Honolulu Ad Club. One of his invited guest speakers was Warren Harding, a Republican Senator from Ohio. Farrington introduced Harding as "the future president of the United States." Harding replied that if Farrington's prediction came true, he would name Farrington governor of the Territory of Hawaii.

Three months after taking office as U.S. President in 1921, Harding fulfilled his promise, appointing Farrington as the Territorial Governor of Hawaiʻi. His tenure was controversial, as he followed the previous Governor in favouring the Whites.

Farrington served as a Republican through 1929 when he retired from public life. Suffering from heart disease, he died on October 6, 1933.

Farrington was memorialized with the dedication of Wallace Rider Farrington High School in the historic Kalihi district of Honolulu. The school adopted The Governors as its nickname and mascot, in honor of the school's namesake. Also named after him are Farrington Street in lower Manoa Valley, Farrington Highway which stretches from Pearl City to the leeward coast of Oahu, and Farrington Hall (demolished in the 1970s) at the University of Hawaii, Manoa where he served as chairman of the University of Hawaii Board of Regents from 1914 to 1920.

== Family ==
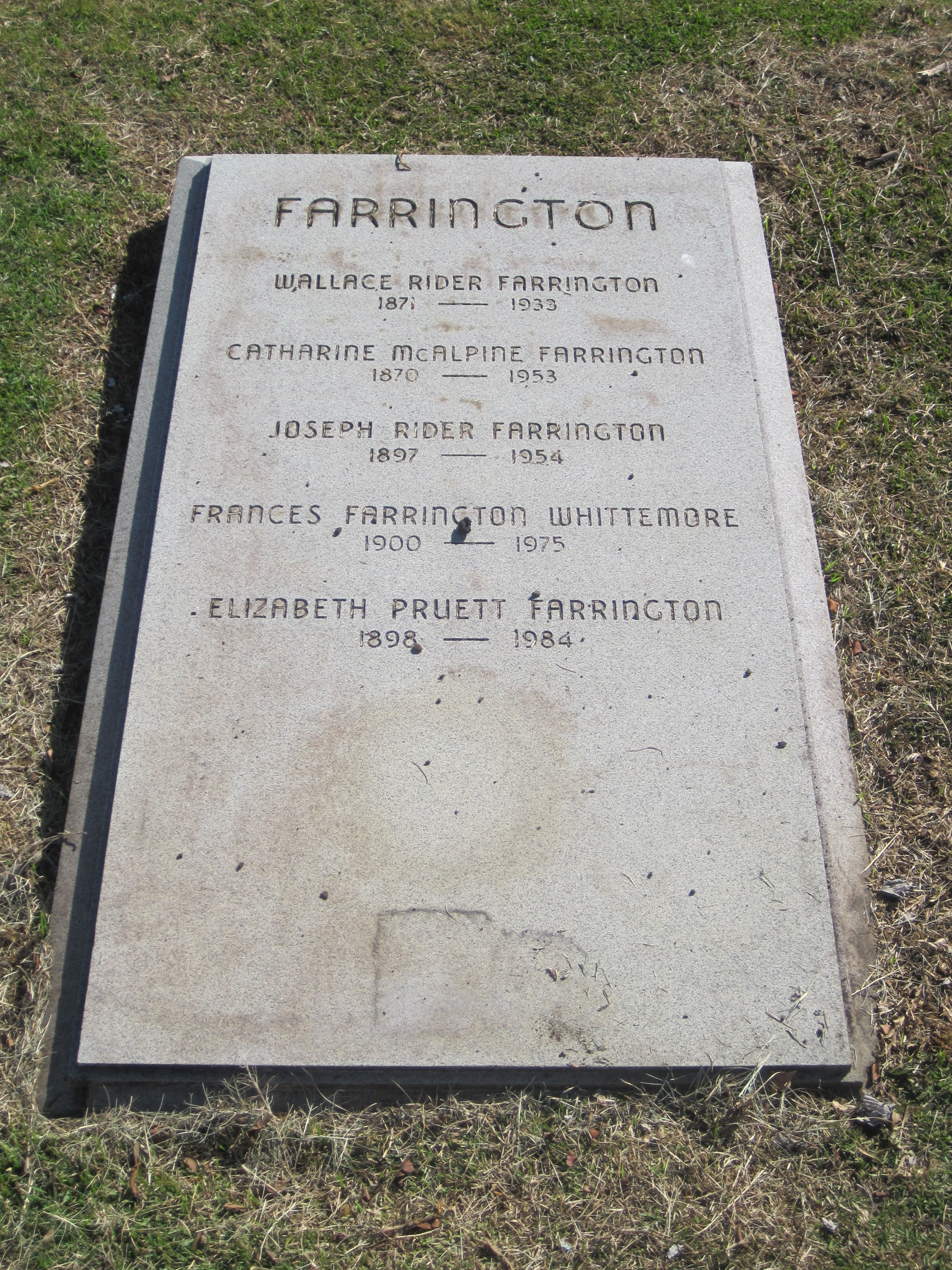
Grave of Wallace Rider Farrington & family, Oahu Cemetery

Farrington was the father of Joseph Rider Farrington, a member of the Senate of the Territory of Hawaiʻi and the territory's delegate to the United States Congress. Joseph Farrington died in office and was succeeded by his wife, Mary Elizabeth Pruett Farrington, who carried on the Farrington name. He was buried in Oahu Cemetery.

Political offices
Preceded by Charles J. McCarthy	Territorial Governor of Hawaii; 1921–1929	Succeeded by Lawrence M. Judd
