= Ingram Stainback =

American judge

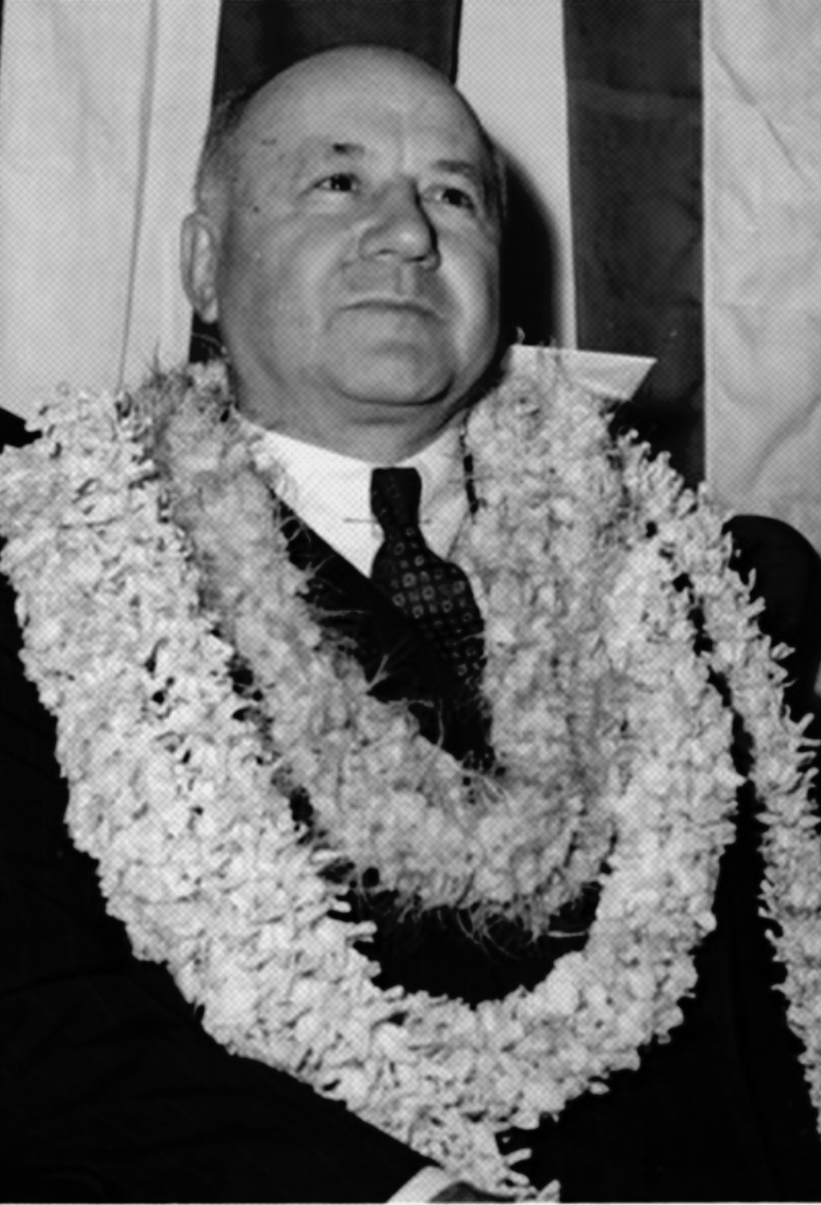

9th Territorial Governor of Hawaii
- In office August 24, 1942 – May 8, 1951
- Appointed by: Franklin D. Roosevelt
- Preceded by: Joseph Poindexter
- Succeeded by: Oren E. Long

Judge of the United States District Court for the Territory of Hawaii
- In office 1940–1943
- Appointed by: Franklin D. Roosevelt
- Preceded by: Seba Cormany Huber
- Succeeded by: Joseph Frank McLaughlin

Personal details
- Born: Ingram Macklin Stainback; May 12, 1883 Somerville, Tennessee, US
- Died: April 12, 1961 (aged 77) Honolulu, Hawaii, US
- Party: Democratic
- Education: Princeton University; University of Chicago

Ingram Macklin Stainback (May 12, 1883 – April 12, 1961) was an American politician. He served as the ninth Territorial Governor of Hawaii from 1942 to 1951.

== Early life ==
Stainback was born in 1883 in Somerville, Tennessee. His father, Charles A. Stainback Sr, was a lawyer and his brother, Charles A. Stainback, was a Democratic member of the Tennessee Senate. The tombstone of Charles A. Stainback (1878-1961), is located in Somerville Cemetery, Somerville, Tennessee.

Stainback received his undergraduate degree from Princeton University and his Juris Doctor from the University of Chicago.

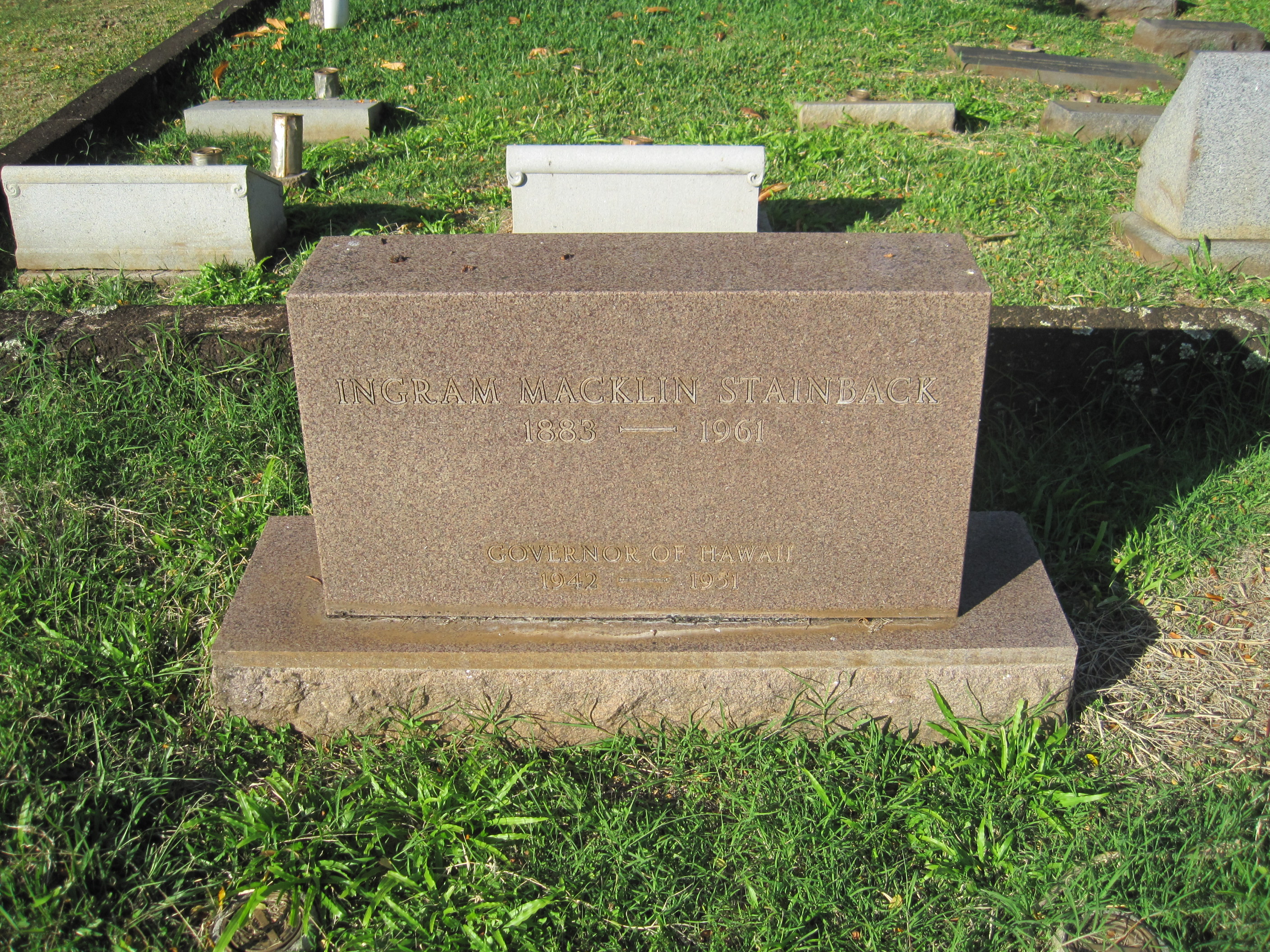
Tombstone of Ingram Macklin Stainback, Oahu Cemetery

== Career ==
Stainback, a well-connected Democrat, came to Hawaii shortly after graduation and was appointed by Democratic Governor Lucius E. Pinkham in 1914 to the post of Territorial Attorney General. He resigned in 1917 to join the Army and rose to the rank of major. When the war ended he returned to private practice in Hawaii.

Previous to his administration, Stainback was a United States District Attorney and then a judge on the U.S. District Court for the Territory of Hawaii. He was appointed to the office by President Franklin D. Roosevelt. It is likely that his friendships with then-Secretary of State Cordell Hull and Senator Kenneth McKellar, both Tennesseans, played a role in his appointment. However, Stainback was essentially powerless for the first two years of his term since Gov. Joseph B. Poindexter had allowed the military to take over the government after the December 1941 Attack on Pearl Harbor by Imperial Japan. During that time, Hawaii was governed by Army generals Walter Short, Delos Emmons, and Robert C. Richardson, Jr.

A conservative Democrat, Stainback, whose full powers were restored on April 13, 1944, played a significant role in the lifting of martial law in wartime Hawaii. Stainback believed Communists were plotting to take over the Hawaiian Islands. He also provided a genesis for Hawaii's Democratic Revolution of 1954 by decrying the land monopolies in Hawaii and calling for land reform. Upon resigning his post on May 8, 1951, Stainback had served eight years, eight months and six days, the longest of any appointed governor up to that point.

On September 26, 1951, he was appointed by President Harry S. Truman as an associate judge to the Hawaii Supreme Court.

=== Views on statehood ===
Stainback had supported statehood until as late as 1946 but vocally opposed it from 1947. In testimony to the House Committee on Territories hearings on statehood for Hawaii in January 1946, Stainback was pro-statehood, saying "I think it is a fundamental principle that no people can govern another people better than they can govern themselves. In other words, we are governed from Washington in a great many things relating to our national affairs". He supported Hawaii's admission based on the fact that, as Hawaii took on "all the burdens of a State", it should also be afforded the privileges of statehood such as voting members of Congress. In March 1946, Stainback still seemed supportive of statehood at further congressional hearings in Washington, but Roger Bell suggests that this was in order to not seem out of step with Hawaiians at a time when his reappointment as governor was pending.

By the middle of the year, statehood campaigners had become openly critical of Stainback because of his seemingly ambivalent attitude to pursuing the issue. By 1947, it was clear that Stainback was reluctant to support immediate statehood or further fund the Statehood Committee. Instead, the Territorial Legislature became the major proponent of statehood, establishing and funding its own Statehood Commission.

Stainback claimed he changed his mind on statehood upon being briefed by the US Army about Communist activity on the islands. Stainback argued for Commonwealth status similar to Puerto Rico instead of statehood, suggesting that Hawaii would benefit from the federal tax exemption which would stimulate economic growth.

== Death and legacy ==
Stainback died in 1961 in Honolulu, Hawaiʻi and is buried at Oahu Cemetery.

Stainback is memorialized on the island of Hawaii by the Stainback Highway, a little-used 18-mile road that leads from the Hawaii Belt Road near Hilo at 19°39′49″N 155°3′40″W to Kulani Correctional Facility, a minimum security state prison at 19°33′0″N 155°18′4″W. His son, Macklin Fleming, was an associate justice of the California Court of Appeal and an early opponent of affirmative action.

Political offices
| Preceded by Joseph Poindexter | Territorial Governor of Hawaii; 1942–1951 | Succeeded by Oren E. Long |
Legal offices
| Preceded by Seba Cormany Huber | United States District Court Judge; 1940–1943 | Succeeded by Joseph Frank McLaughlin |
