= Victor S. K. Houston =

American politician and naval officer from Hawaii (1876-1959)

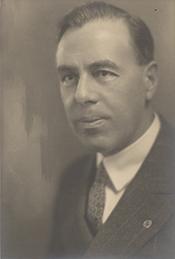

Delegate to the U.S. House of Representatives from Hawaii Territory's At-large district
- In office March 4, 1927 – March 3, 1933
- Preceded by: William P. Jarrett
- Succeeded by: Lincoln L. McCandless

Personal details
- Born: July 22, 1876 San Francisco, California
- Died: July 31, 1959 (aged 83) Honolulu, Territory of Hawaii
- Party: Republican
- Education: United States Naval Academy

Military service
- Allegiance: United States of America
- Branch/service: United States Navy
- Years of service: 1897–1926; 1941-1945
- Rank: Commander
- Battles/wars: World War II

Victor Stewart Kaleoaloha Houston (July 22, 1876 — July 31, 1959) was an American politician and naval officer who served in the United States Congress representing the Territory of Hawaii.

== Education and naval career ==
Born in San Francisco, California, he was the son of United States Navy Rear Admiral Edwin Samuel Houston and Caroline Poor Kahikiola Brickwood, who was part Native Hawaiian.

Houston attended Real Schule in Dresden, Saxony then at the Cantonal College in Lausanne, Switzerland. He returned to the United States where he attended Force School in Washington, DC and then Werntz Preparatory School in Annapolis, Maryland. In 1897, Houston obtained a degree and commission as a naval officer from the United States Naval Academy. He retired from active service in the armed forces in 1926 with the rank of commander.

== World War II service ==
With the Japanese attack on Pearl Harbor on December 7, 1941, Houston was recalled up to duty as a naval officer, and remained in the Navy until March 1, 1945. He rose through the ranks to become a captain on June 9, 1943.

== Politics ==
Houston moved to Hawaii in 1909 where he became active with the Hawaii Republican Party. From March 4, 1927 to March 3, 1933, Houston served several terms as a Congressional delegate for the territory to the United States House of Representatives. He lost a bid for reelection and retired from politics. He was also a delegate to the Republican National Conventions in 1928 and 1932.

== Death ==
He died in Honolulu, Hawaii on July 31, 1959, just three weeks before statehood, and was buried in Oahu Cemetery.

== See also ==
- List of Asian Americans and Pacific Islands Americans in the United States Congress

U.S. House of Representatives
Preceded by William Paul Jarrett	Delegate to the U.S. House of Representatives from Hawaii Territory's at-large congressional district March 4, 1927 – March 3, 1933	Succeeded by Lincoln Loy McCandless
