= Samuel Wilder King =

American politician

Samuel King
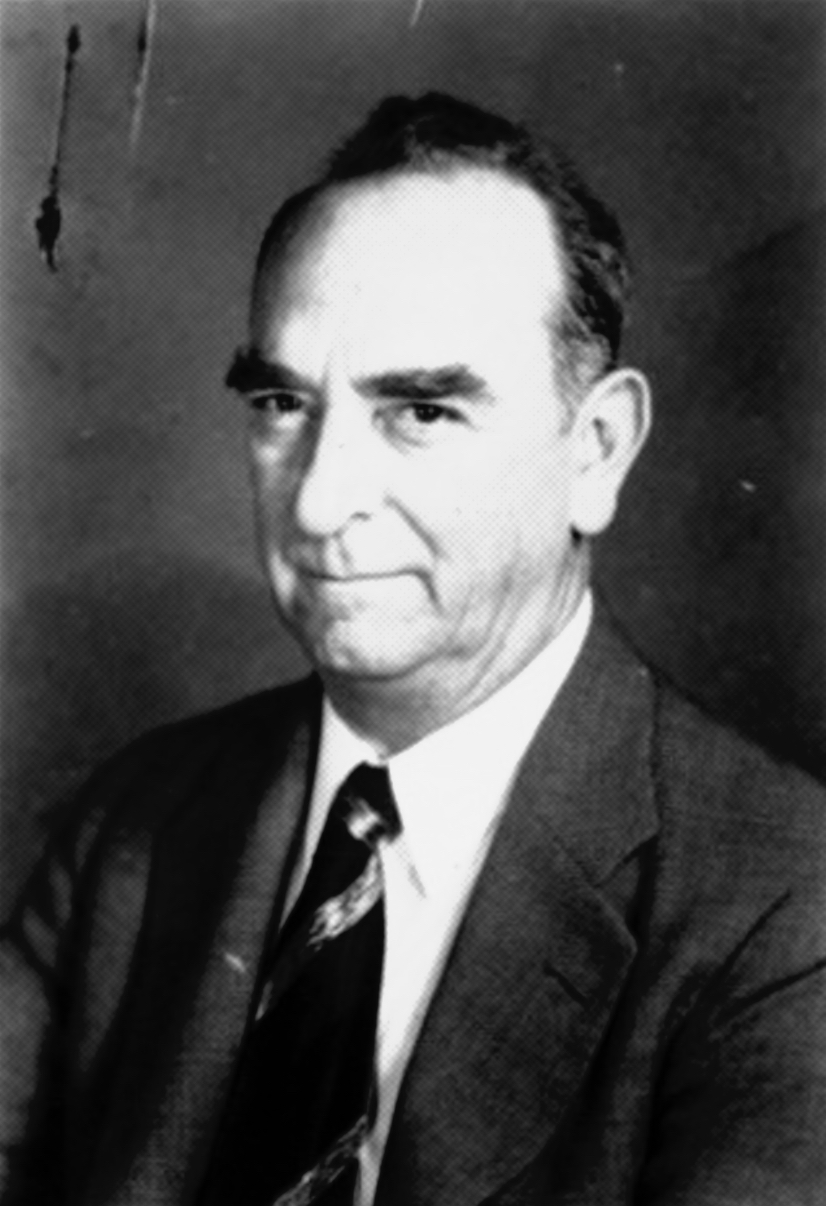

11th Territorial Governor of Hawaii
- In office February 28, 1953 – July 26, 1957
- Appointed by: Dwight D. Eisenhower
- Preceded by: Oren E. Long
- Succeeded by: William F. Quinn

Delegate to the U.S. House of Representatives from Hawaii's at-large district
- In office January 3, 1935 – January 3, 1943
- Preceded by: Lincoln Loy McCandless
- Succeeded by: Joseph Rider Farrington

Personal details
- Born: Samuel Wilder King; December 17, 1886 Honolulu, Hawaiian Kingdom
- Died: March 24, 1959 (aged 72) Honolulu, Territory of Hawaii
- Party: Republican
- Spouse: Pauline Nawahineokalai Evans
- Children: 5, including Samuel
- Relatives: Leilehua Lanzilotti (great-grandchild)
- Education: United States Naval Academy (BS)

Military service
- Allegiance: United States
- Branch/service: United States Navy
- Years of service: 1910–1924; 1943–1946
- Rank: Captain

Samuel Wilder King (December 17, 1886 – March 24, 1959) was the eleventh territorial governor of Hawaii and served from 1953 to 1957. He was appointed to the office after the term of Oren E. Long. Previously, King served in the United States House of Representatives as a delegate from the Territory of Hawaii. He was a member of the Republican Party of Hawaii and was the first of native Hawaiian descent to rise to the highest office in the territory.

== Education ==
His father James A. King (1832–1899) was a ship's master for Samuel Gardner Wilder, and later politician in the Republic of Hawaii. His mother was Charlotte Holmes Davis, daughter of part-Hawaiian Robert Grimes Davis, who descended from Mahi (daughter of Kalanihoʻoulumokuikekai) and Oliver Holmes, Governor of Oʻahu under Kamehameha I. King was born December 17, 1886, in Honolulu and was a subject of the Kingdom of Hawai'i. A devout Roman Catholic, King attended Saint Louis School, but graduated from McKinley High School. Upon graduating, King went on to study at the United States Naval Academy in Annapolis, Maryland. He entered the United States Navy as a commissioned officer where he served from 1910 to 1924. At the time of his discharge, he had attained the rank of lieutenant commander. On March 18, 1912, he married Pauline Nawahineokalai Evans, another part-Hawaiian, a descendant of Kaniau of Maui.

== Early career ==
King returned to his hometown in 1925 where he entered the real estate profession. In 1932, he ran for his first public office and served for two years on the Board of Supervisors of Honolulu. In 1934, King was elected to the United States Congress as a delegate. He served in Washington, D.C., from January 1935 to January 1943. With the outbreak of World War II, King resigned from Congress to accept a naval commission to become a commander, then captain. He retired from military service in 1946.

== Later career ==
Once again, King returned to his hometown and was appointed to a sub-cabinet office of the governor's administration. King served in the Emergency Housing Committee for a year. He was then appointed to the Hawaii Statehood Commission in 1947 where he stayed until 1953. President of the United States Dwight D. Eisenhower appointed King to the governorship that year. He was the first governor of Hawaiian ancestry. He served in ʻIolani Palace until his resignation on July 31, 1957. During his term in office he signed HB 706 on June 5, 1957, which outlawed the death penalty in Hawaii. It became Act 282. He died in Honolulu March 24, 1959, just before Hawaii achieved statehood. He was buried in the National Memorial Cemetery of the Pacific.

== Descendants ==
His son Samuel Pailthorpe King (1916–2010) became a lawyer and Federal District Judge. His other children were Charlotte King Ebert, a realtor; Evans Palikū King, a Naval officer and submarine captain; Pauline Nawahineokalaʻi King, a professor of Hawaiian History; and Davis Mauliola King. He and his wife Pauline Nawahineokalaʻi Evans King had seven grandchildren. Michael Mc Andrews, Tim Mc Andrews, Samuel P. King, Jr, Louise Kealiʻiloma King Lanzilotti, Charlotte Lelepoki King, Mahi Savage, and Pauline King. Pulitzer-prize nominated composer Leilehua Lanzilotti is among his great-grandchildren.

== Legacy ==
In 2018, King was the subject of the short documentary Samuel Wilder King: Hawaii Statehood directed by Carolina Gratianne and produced by Daniel Bernardi with the collaboration of El Dorado Films, the Veteran Documentary Corps, and the King family.

== See also ==
- List of Asian Americans and Pacific Islands Americans in the United States Congress
- List of minority governors and lieutenant governors in the United States

U.S. House of Representatives
Preceded by Lincoln Loy McCandless	Delegate to the U.S. House of Representatives from Hawaii's at-large congressional district 1935–1943	Succeeded by Joseph Rider Farrington
Political offices
Preceded by Oren E. Long	Governor of Hawaii; 1953–1957	Succeeded by William F. Quinn
