= William Paul Jarrett =

American politician

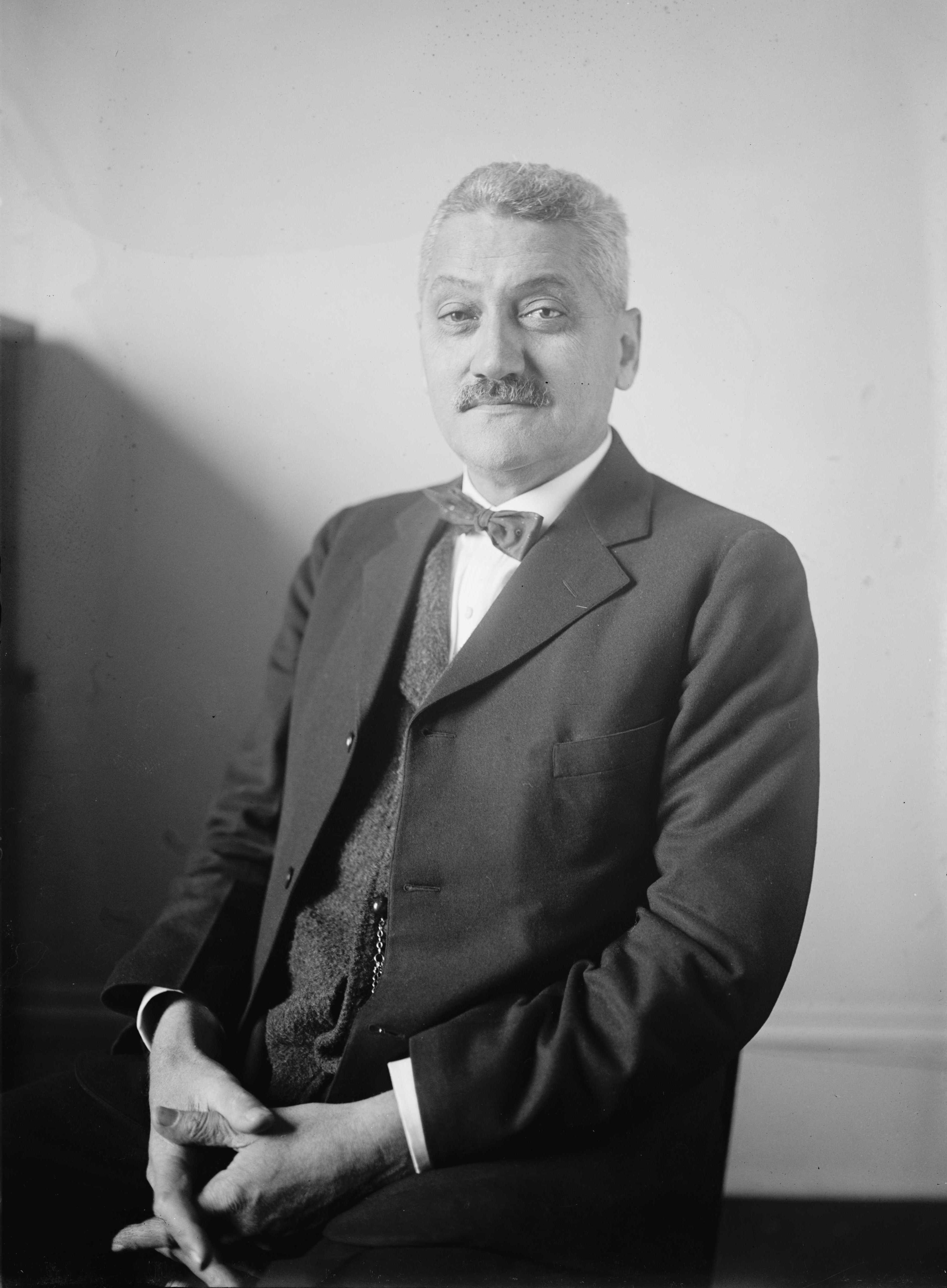

Delegate to the U.S. House of Representatives from Hawaii Territory's At-large district
- In office March 4, 1923 – March 3, 1927
- Preceded by: Henry Alexander Baldwin
- Succeeded by: Victor S. K. Houston

Personal details
- Born: August 22, 1877 Honolulu, Kingdom of Hawaii
- Died: November 10, 1929 (aged 52) Honolulu, Territory of Hawaii
- Resting place: Diamond Head Memorial Park
- Party: Democratic
- Spouse: Mary H.K. Clark Jarrett (Wife)
- Relatives: Arthur L. Jarrett (Cousin); Art Jarrett (Nephew)
- Occupation: police officer, politician

William Paul Jarrett (August 22, 1877 – November 10, 1929) was a sheriff and congressional delegate representing the Territory of Hawaii.

== Biography ==
Jarrett was born August 22, 1877, and grew up in Honolulu, Hawaii, on the island of Oahu, and attended Saint Louis School. Of Native Hawaiian descent, his father was William Haalilo Jarrett and mother was Emma Kaoo Stevens. He married Mary Heanu Kalanienohoikawaiohilo Kekaiulaokala Clark with whom he had six children.

Jarrett became one of the earliest leaders of the Hawaii Democratic Party. Jarrett served as deputy Sheriff of the City and County of Honolulu from 1906 to 1908, Sheriff until 1914, and High Sheriff of the Territory of Hawaii from 1914 to 1922.

From March 4, 1923, to March 3, 1927, Jarrett served in the United States Congress as a territorial delegate. He won elections in November 1922 and 1924, but lost the bid for re-election in 1927. He died on November 10, 1929.

He was interred at Diamond Head Memorial Park. William P. Jarrett Middle School, established in 1955, was named after him.

== See also ==
- List of Asian Americans and Pacific Islands Americans in the United States Congress

Government offices
Preceded by Curtis P. Iaukea	Sheriff of Honolulu County; 1910–1914	Succeeded by Charles H. Rose
Preceded by William Henry	High Sheriff of Hawaii Territory; 1914–1922	Succeeded by John C. Lane
U.S. House of Representatives
Preceded by Henry Alexander Baldwin	Delegate to the U.S. House of Representatives from Hawaii Territory's at-large congressional district March 4, 1923 – March 3, 1927	Succeeded by Victor Stewart Kaleoaloha Houston
