= Charles J. McCarthy =

American politician

Charles James McCarthy
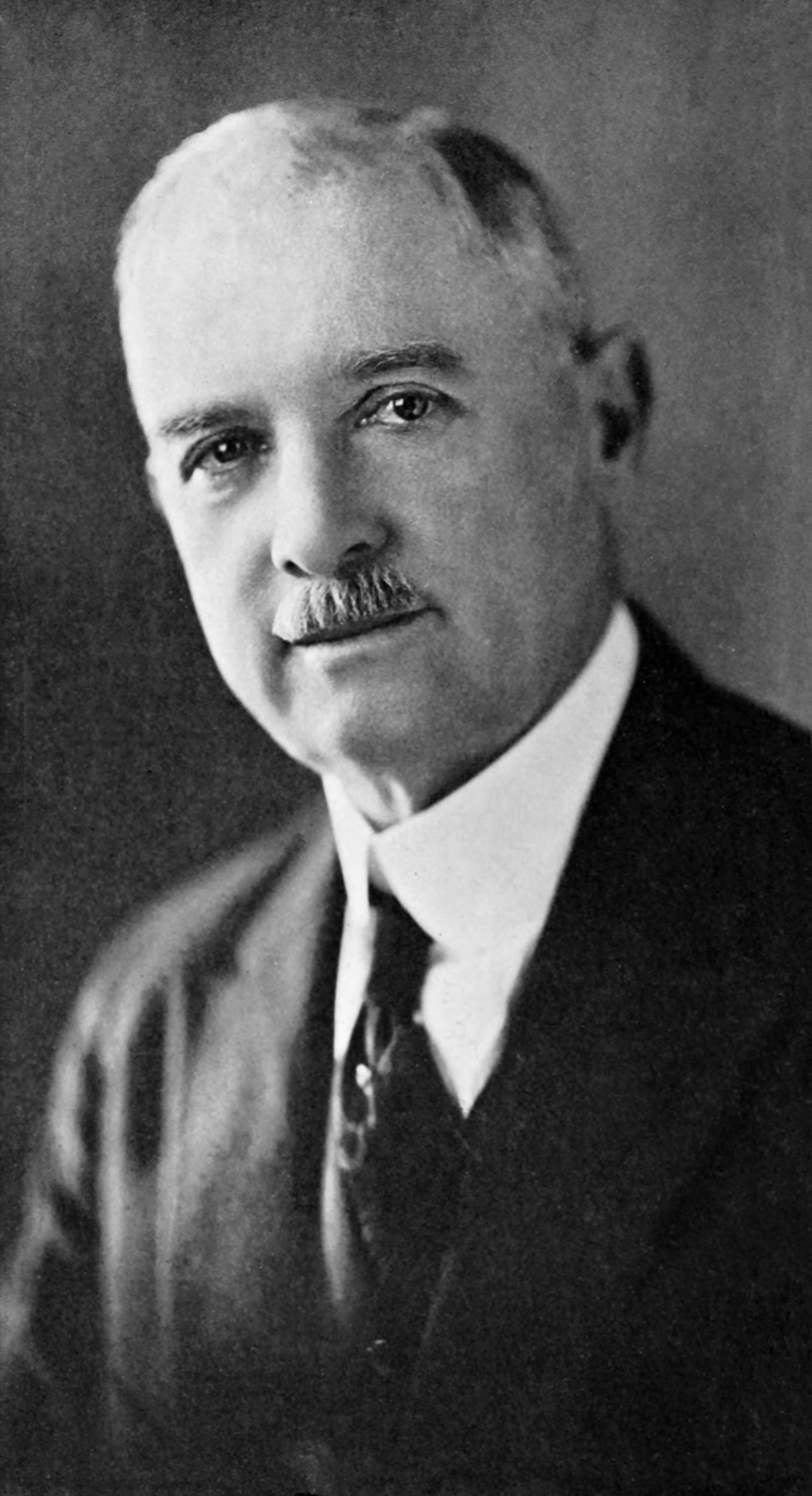

5th Territorial Governor of Hawaii
- In office April 18, 1918 – June 1, 1921
- Appointed by: Woodrow Wilson
- President: Woodrow Wilson; Warren G. Harding
- Preceded by: Lucius E. Pinkham
- Succeeded by: Wallace R. Farrington

Member of the Senate of the Territory of Hawaiʻi
- In office 1907–1912

Member of the House of Nobles of the Kingdom of Hawaiʻi
- In office 1890–1890

Personal details
- Born: August 4, 1861 Boston, Massachusetts
- Died: November 26, 1929 (aged 68) Honolulu, Territory of Hawaii
- Party: Democratic
- Spouse: Margaret Theresa Morgan

Military service
- Allegiance: Kingdom of Hawaii; Republic of Hawaii
- Branch/service: Honolulu Rifles; National Guard of Hawaii
- Years of service: 1888-1902
- Rank: Captain (Rifles); Lieutenant Colonel (Guard)

Charles James McCarthy (August 4, 1861 – November 26, 1929) was the fifth Territorial Governor of Hawaii and served from 1918 to 1921.

McCarthy was born August 4, 1861, in Boston, Massachusetts, to Charles McCarthy and Joana (McCarthy) McCarthy. McCarthy moved with his parents to San Francisco, California, in 1866. He was a marginal entrepreneur who came to Hawaii to manage the affairs of a wholesale fruit house. McCarthy owned a saloon and for a time bottled his own alcoholic beverages.

He was a member of the House of Nobles in 1890, supporter of Liliuokalani and ironically a captain in the pro-annexation Honolulu Rifles. He also was a territorial senator 1907-12 and treasurer 1912-14 before becoming chief executive. He was co-founder of the Hawai'i Democratic Party.

He was appointed by President of the United States Woodrow Wilson to the office after the term of Lucius E. Pinkham. McCarthy believed Republicans were promoting immigration of Oriental laborers to manipulate Hawaii’s demographics to their advantage and served their own business interests, McCarthy was ardently anti-Asian. He appointed Charles Rice and Alfred Castle to lobby in favor of the Hawaiian Rehabilitation Bill which became the Hawaiian Homes Commission Act . The omnibus bill also contained language that made it difficult for “Orientals” from winning homesteads, and barred them from federal jobs in favor of Hawaiians. McCarthy also proposed that the military replace self-government in order to negate possible bloc voting by the large Japanese population in Hawaii. When asked by a congressman if the Japanese would think the action was directed at them, McCarthy said, “Let them think so; what do we care?”

McCarthy also railed against the land policies of the Big Five and was the first governor to advocate statehood for Hawaii. Annoyed by the policies of his Democratic administration, McCarthy was gently nudged out of politics by Republicans. In return, he was given a job as Washington representative of the Honolulu Chamber of Commerce, and later general manager of Hawaiian Dredging Co. during which he worked on the Waikiki Reclamation project which resulted in the construction of the Ala Wai Canal. He died in 1929 in Honolulu, Hawaii.

Political offices
Preceded by Lucius E. Pinkham	Territorial Governor of Hawaii; April 18, 1918 - June 1, 1921	Succeeded by Wallace R. Farrington
