= Lucius E. Pinkham =

Fourth Territorial Governor of Hawaii (1850–1922)

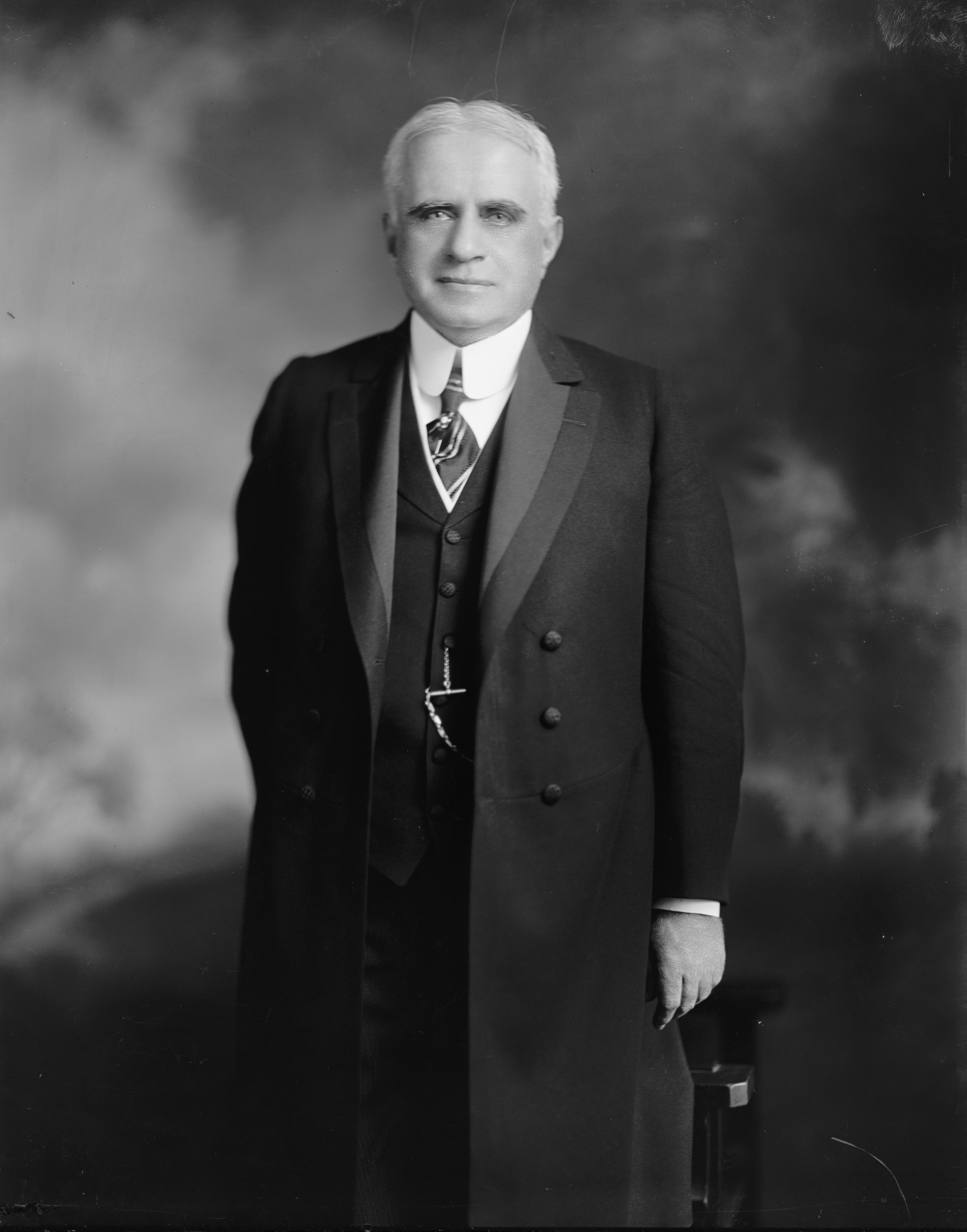

4th Territorial Governor of Hawaii
- In office November 30, 1913 – June 22, 1918
- Appointed by: Woodrow Wilson
- Preceded by: Walter F. Frear
- Succeeded by: Charles J. McCarthy

Personal details
- Born: Lucius Eugene Pinkham; September 19, 1850 Chicopee, Massachusetts, U.S.
- Died: November 2, 1922 (aged 72) San Francisco, California, U.S.
- Party: Democratic

Lucius Eugene Pinkham (September 19, 1850 – November 2, 1922) was the fourth Territorial Governor of Hawaii, serving from 1913 to 1918. Pinkham was the first member of the Democratic Party of Hawaii to become governor.

== Early life ==
Pinkham was born September 19, 1850, in Chicopee, Massachusetts. His parents were Lucius Moulton, a cotton mill proprietor, and Caroline Smith (Fiske) Pinkham. He attended public schools in Boston and Hartford, Connecticut. Although he intended to attend Yale, a horseriding accident prevented him from walking for several years and he never attended college. Pinkham arrived in Hawaii in 1892 to build a coal handling plant for Oahu Railway and Land Company, and then went to California in 1894. From 1898 to 1903 he was manager of Pacific Hardware, another family business of Benjamin Dillingham. He also oversaw well projects for the sugarcane plantations.

== Hawaii Board of Health ==
On April 13, 1904, Pinkham was appointed president of the territorial Board of Health. While president of the Board of Health, he developed the idea of dredging the marshlands of Waikīkī via a two-mile long drainage canal. Although the idea was approved by the Board of Health, no action was taken on the proposal. Over his two terms, Pinkham's achievements included improving the conditions of the lepers at the Molokai settlement, economically reducing the occurrence of bubonic plague and cholera in Hawaii.

In 1907, Pinkham's remarks on the Japanese community's behavior during a bubonic plague outbreak were found to be offensive, and the Japanese community's reaction was a major factor in Governor Frear's decision to not reappoint Pinkham for another term. Pinkham was removed from the Board of Health on April 12, 1908.

== Hawaiian Sugar Planter's Association ==
In April 1909, Pinkham was employed as a labor commissioner by the Hawaiian Sugar Planters' Association (HSPA) to help transport Filipino labor recruits to Hawaii. After four years, the HSPA ended Pinkham's contract "because of differences of opinion about the methods and purposes of recruiting Filipino workers."

== Territorial Governor of Hawaii ==
Despite having no previous political experience, U.S. President Woodrow Wilson appointed Pinkham territorial governor of Hawaii on November 29, 1913, succeeding Governor Walter Frear. His appointment was controversial among Hawaii Democrats. The U.S. Senate confirmed Pinkham's appointment by a vote of 46–24, by just one vote more than the two-thirds necessary for confirmation. Pinkham was the state's first governor from the Democratic Party, although his affiliations with the Republican Party were often under question.

In 1917, during Pinkham's governorship, the deposed former monarch of the Hawaiian Islands, Queen Liliʻuokalani, died and was buried at the Royal Mausoleum of Hawaii. The construction of what would become the Ala Wai Canal and the drainage of the Waikīkī marshlands are credited for enabling the development of Waikīkī as a tourist center, and are considered to be one of the most enduring legacies of Pinkham's tenure. Pinkham also worked aggressively to improve the military defense of Hawaii.

He voluntarily resigned from his position and was replaced by Charles J. McCarthy on June 22, 1918.

Pinkham, who never married, died November 2, 1922, in San Francisco, California.

Political offices
Preceded by Walter F. Frear	Territorial Governor of Hawaii; 1913 - 1918	Succeeded by Charles J. McCarthy
