= Territory of Hawaii =

Organized incorporated territory of the United States, 1900–1959

Coordinates: 21.3°N 157.8°W

Territory of Hawaii Panalāʻau o Hawaiʻi (Hawaiian)
- Organized incorporated territory of the United States
- 1900–1959
- Flag Seal

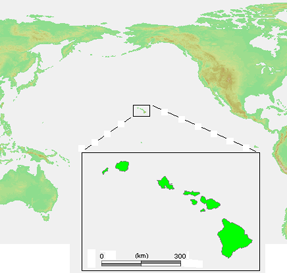
- Main islands of the Territory of Hawaii

Anthem
- "Hawaiʻi Ponoʻī"
- Capital: Honolulu
- Government
  - Type: Organized incorporated territory
  - Motto: Ua Mau ke Ea o ka ʻĀina i ka Pono; "The life of the land is perpetuated in righteousness"
- Governor
  - 1900–1903 (first): Sanford B. Dole
  - 1957–1959 (last): William F. Quinn
- Military Governor
  - 1941: LTG Walter Short
  - 1941–1943: LTG Delos Emmons
  - 1943–1944: LTG Robert C. Richardson Jr.
- History
  - Annexation of Hawaii: August 12, 1898
  - Hawaiian Organic Act: April 30, 1900
  - Attack on Pearl Harbor: December 7, 1941
  - Martial law: 1941–1944
  - Revolution of 1954: 1946–1958
  - Hawaii Admission Act: August 21, 1959
| Preceded by | Succeeded by |
| Republic of Hawaii | Hawaii; Palmyra Atoll |

The Territory of Hawaii or Hawaii Territory (Hawaiian: Panalāʻau o Hawaiʻi) was an organized incorporated territory of the United States that existed from April 30, 1900, until August 21, 1959, when most of its territory was admitted to the United States as the 50th US state, the State of Hawaii. The Hawaii Admission Act specified that the State of Hawaii would not include Palmyra Island, the Midway Islands, Kingman Reef, Johnston Atoll and Sand Island.

On July 4, 1898, the United States Congress passed the Newlands Resolution authorizing the US annexation of the Republic of Hawaii, and five weeks later, on August 12, Hawaii became a US territory. In April 1900, Congress approved the Hawaiian Organic Act which organized the territory. United States Public Law 103-150, adopted in 1993 (informally known as the Apology Resolution), acknowledged that "the overthrow of the Kingdom of Hawaii occurred with the active participation of agents and citizens of the United States" and also "that the Native Hawaiian people never directly relinquished to the United States their claims to their inherent sovereignty as a people over their national lands, either through the Kingdom of Hawaii or through a plebiscite or referendum".

Hawaii's territorial history includes a period from 1941 to 1944, during World War II, when the islands were placed under martial law. Civilian government was dissolved and a military governor was appointed.

== Background ==
Historical population
| Year | Pop. | ±% |
|---|---|---|
| 1900 | 154,001 | — |
| 1910 | 191,874 | +24.6% |
| 1920 | 255,881 | +33.4% |
| 1930 | 368,300 | +43.9% |
| 1940 | 422,770 | +14.8% |
| 1950 | 499,794 | +18.2% |
Source: 1900–1950;

After the overthrow of the Hawaiian Kingdom in January 1893, the Provisional Government of Hawaii set out to effect Hawaii's speedy annexation by the United States. A commission, led by Lorrin A. Thurston, was sent to Washington, D.C. to negotiate an annexation treaty with US President Benjamin Harrison. A delegation led by Princess Victoria Kaʻiulani also went to Washington to protest the overthrow and to lobby against annexation.

Harrison and the commission signed a treaty of annexation, which was sent to the US Senate for ratification. However, the Senate did not act before March 4, 1893, when Harrison's term ended and Grover Cleveland took office. The new president was an anti-imperialist and strongly opposed to annexation. He withdrew the treaty from consideration, and ordered a congressional investigation into the events surrounding the overthrow of the Hawaiian monarchy. After receiving the committee's first report, Cleveland recommended the restoration of Queen Liliʻuokalani. This did not go over well even with his own party. Eventually a bipartisan congressional vote called for a "hands off" policy in regards to internal events in Hawaii. Further investigation by Congress led to the Morgan Report, which established that US troops in Hawaii had been completely neutral during the overthrow, and exonerated the US military from any accusations of complicity.

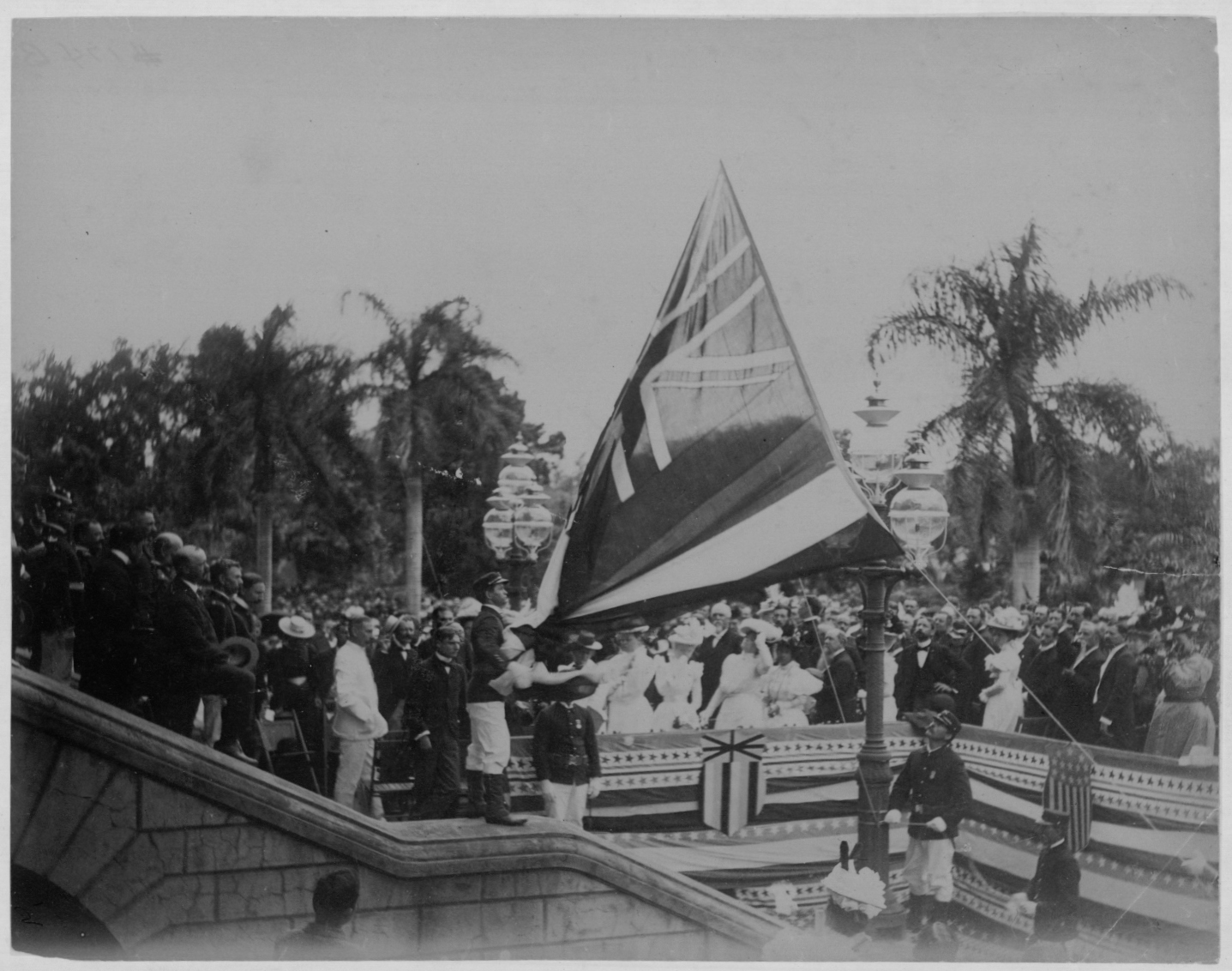
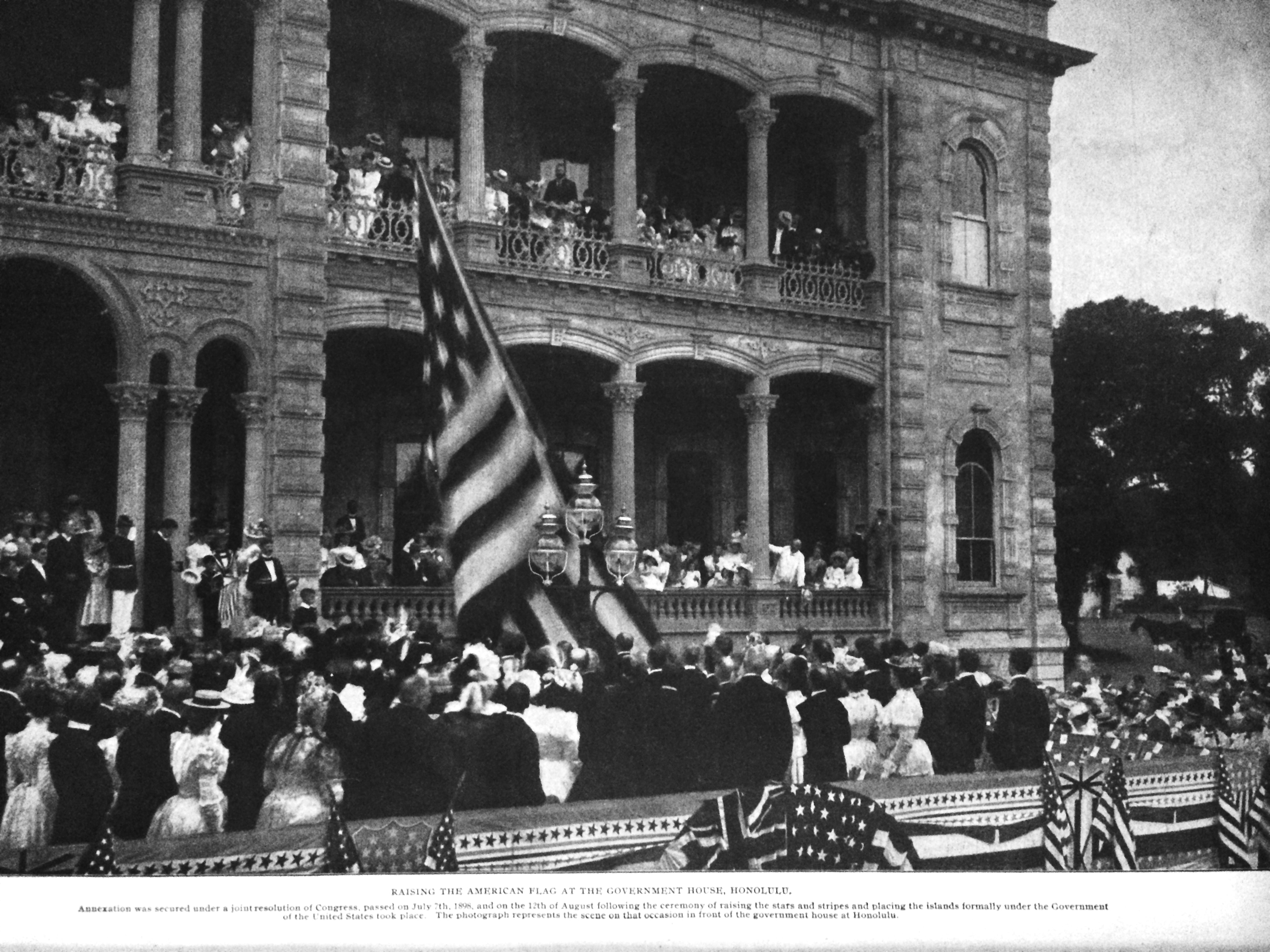
On August 12, 1898, the flag of Hawaii over ʻIolani Palace was lowered and the American flag was raised to signify annexation.

The Provisional Government convened a constitutional convention to establish the Republic of Hawaii. Thurston was urged to become the nation's first president but he was worried his brazen personality would damage the cause of annexation. The more conservative Sanford B. Dole, former Supreme Court Justice and friend of Queen Liliʻuokalani, was elected as the first and only president of the new government.

During the Spanish–American War, Hawaii's strategic location relative to the Philippines made it especially important to American interests, as argued by naval strategist Alfred Thayer Mahan. This and fears that the Empire of Japan would seize control of the islands provided momentum for the proponents of annexation. On July 4, 1898, the US Congress passed a joint resolution to provide for annexing of Hawaii to the United States. The resolution, commonly known as the Newlands Resolution (named after US Representative Francis G. Newlands), was signed into law three days later by President McKinley. The Newlands Resolution states:

Whereas, the Government of the Republic of Hawaii having, in due form, signified its consent, in the manner provided by its constitution, to cede absolutely and without reserve to the United States of America, all rights of sovereignty of whatsoever kind in and over the Hawaiian Islands and their dependencies, and also to cede and transfer to the United States, the absolute fee and ownership of all public, Government, or Crown lands, public buildings or edifices, ports, harbors, military equipment, and all other public property of every kind and description belonging to the Government of the Hawaiian Islands, together with every right and appurtenance thereunto appertaining: Therefore,

Resolved by the Senate and House of Representatives of the United States of America in Congress assembled, That said cession is accepted, ratified, and confirmed, and that the said Hawaiian Islands and their dependencies be, and they are hereby, annexed as a part of the territory of the United States and are subject to the sovereign dominion thereof, and that all and singular the property and rights hereinbefore mentioned are vested in the United States of America.

The resolution took effect on August 12, 1898, and a formal ceremony marking the transfer of Hawaiian state sovereignty to the United States was held that day on the steps of the ʻIolani Palace in Honolulu. The Hawaiian flag was lowered and the American flag was raised in its place.

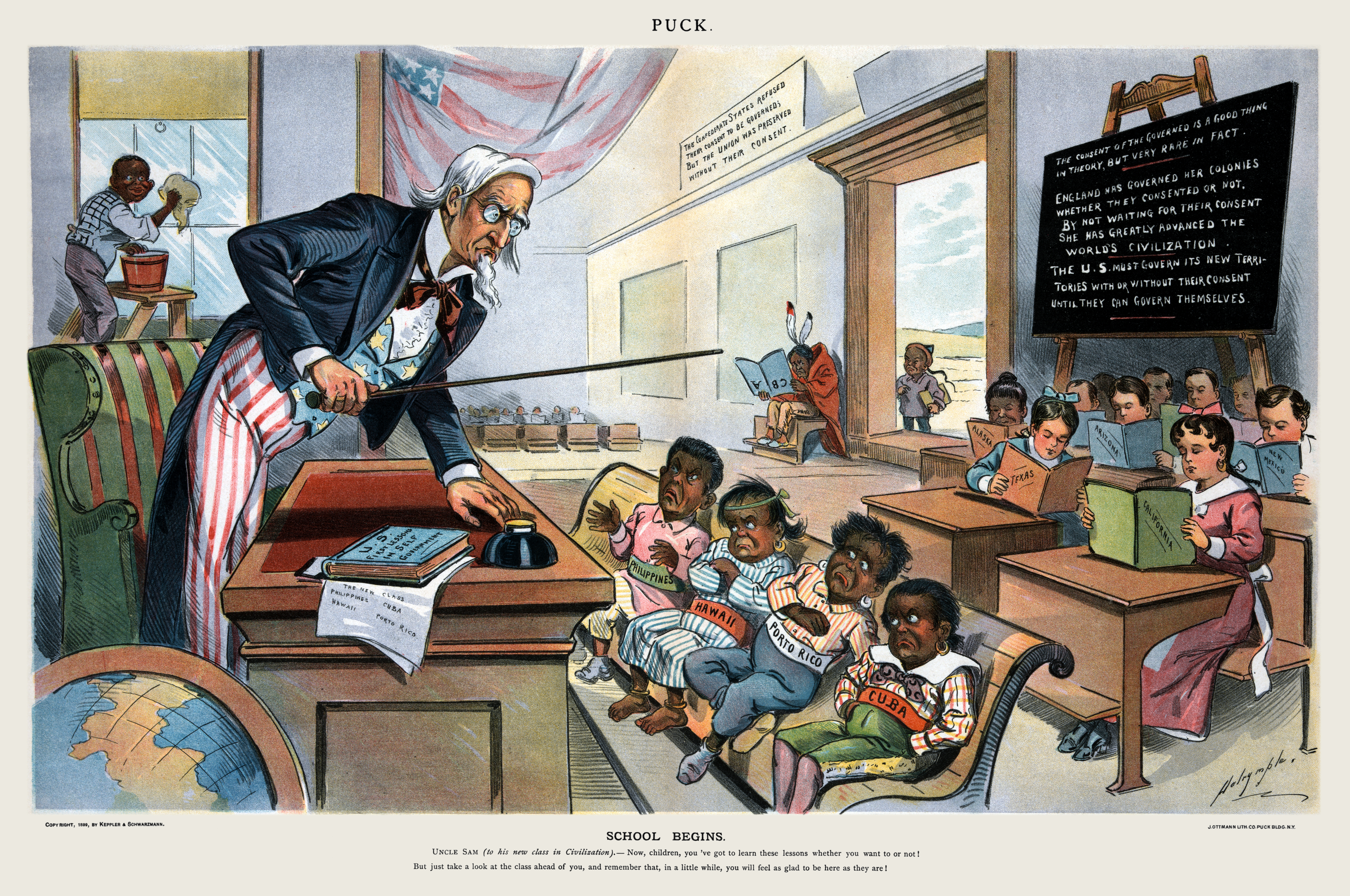
Cartoon depicting the United States, its territories, and US-controlled regions as a classroom with belligerent Philippines, Hawaii, Puerto Rico, and Cuba

The Resolution also provided for the establishment of a five-member commission to study what new laws were needed regarding the management and disposition of public lands in Hawaii, and to develop a frame of government for the islands. Its members were Sanford Dole (who, under the terms of the Resolution, retained the powers he previously exercised as President of Hawaii), Walter F. Frear (who likewise remained Judge of the Supreme Court of Hawaii), US Senators Shelby M. Cullom (R-Illinois) and John T. Morgan (D-Alabama), and US Representative Robert R. Hitt (R-Illinois). The commission's final report was submitted to Congress for a debate which lasted over a year. Many Southern Representatives and Senators raised objections to establishing an elected territorial government in Hawaii, as doing so would open a pathway for the admission of a state with a "non-white" majority population at a time when strict "Jim Crow laws" enforced white political control throughout the American South.

== Organic Act ==
In early 1900, Congress passed an Act To provide a government for the Territory of Hawaii, which was signed into law by President William McKinley on April 30, 1900. This organic act established the office of governor of Hawaii. Territorial governors were appointed by the president of the United States with the advice and consent of the US Senate. They served for four years, unless removed sooner by the president.

=== Territorial governors ===
- Sanford B. Dole, Republican (1900–1903)
- George R. Carter, Republican (1903–1907)
- Walter F. Frear, Republican (1907–1913)
- Lucius E. Pinkham, Democrat (1913–1918)
- Charles J. McCarthy, Democrat (1918–1921)
- Wallace R. Farrington, Republican (1921–1929)
- Lawrence M. Judd, Republican (1929–1934)
- Joseph B. Poindexter, Democrat (1934–1942)
- Ingram M. Stainback, Democrat (1942–1951)
- Oren E. Long, Democrat (1951–1953)
- Samuel Wilder King, Republican (1953–1957)
- William F. Quinn, Republican (1957–1959)

=== Legislature ===
The Organic Act also created a bicameral Hawaii Territorial Legislature. It consisted of a lower chamber, the House of Representatives, and an upper chamber, the Senate. Its members were elected by popular vote.

=== Judiciary ===
The Act created the Territorial Supreme Court and additional appellate courts. All judges of these courts were appointed by the President with advice and consent of the Senate.

=== Congressional delegate ===
The Act also provided that Hawaii, like other US territories, would have a non-voting delegate to the US Congress.

- Robert William Wilcox (1900–1903)
- Jonah Kūhiō Kalanianaʻole (1903–1922)
- Henry Alexander Baldwin (1922)
- William Paul Jarrett (1923–1927)
- Victor Stewart Kaleoaloha Houston (1927–1933)
- Lincoln Loy McCandless (1933–1935)
- Samuel Wilder King (1935–1943)
- Joseph Rider Farrington (1943–1954)
- Mary Elizabeth Pruett Farrington (1954–1957)
- John Anthony Burns (1957–1959)

== Tourism ==
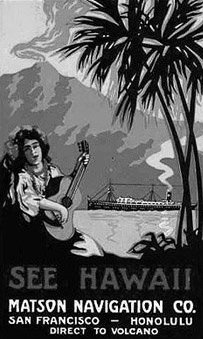
Matson Navigation Company advertisement

Hawaii's tourism industry began in the 1880s, when sailing vessels between San Francisco and Hawaii carrying freight began to also take passengers. Oceanic Steamship Company was the first transpacific shipping company to begin promoting tourism to Hawaii. Matson Navigation Company followed soon after, eventually buying out Oceanic in 1926. Matson's fleet included the SS Wilhelmina, rivaling the best passenger ships serving traditional Atlantic routes. With the boom in interest of Hawaiian vacations by America's wealthiest families in the late 1920s, Matson added the SS Mariposa, SS Monterey and SS Lurline (one of many Lurlines) to the fleet.

Matson operated two resort hotels in Honolulu near royal grounds. The first (and for a time the only) hotel on Waikīkī was the Moana Hotel which opened in 1901. As the first hotel in Waikīkī, the Moana Hotel was nicknamed the "First Lady of Waikīkī." The hotel gained international attention in 1920 when Edward, Prince of Wales and future King Edward VIII of the United Kingdom, stayed as a guest. In 1927, the luxurious Royal Hawaiian Hotel, informally called the "Pink Palace of the Pacific", opened for business. It was the preferred Hawaii residence of President Franklin D. Roosevelt when he visited Hawaii during World War II.

== Military bases ==
With annexation, the United States saw Hawaii as its most strategic military asset. McKinley and his successor US President Theodore Roosevelt expanded the military presence in Hawaii and established several key bases, some still in use today. By 1906, the entire island of Oahu was being fortified at the coastlines with the construction of a "Ring of Steel," a series of gun batteries mounted on steel coastal walls. One of the few surviving batteries completed in 1911, Battery Randolph, is today the site of the U.S. Army Museum of Hawaii.

List of territorial installations:

- Camp McKinley (est. 1898)
- Fort Kamehameha (est. 1907)
- Pearl Harbor Naval Station (est. 1908)
- Fort Shafter (est. 1907)
- Fort Ruger (est. 1909)
- Schofield Barracks (est. 1909)
- Battery Closson (est. 1911)
- Battery Dudley (est. 1911)
- Battery Randolph (est. 1911)
- Fort DeRussy (est. 1915)
- Wheeler Army Airfield (est. 1922)

== Industrial boom and the "Big Five" ==
As a territory of the United States, sugarcane plantations gained a new infusion of investment. By getting rid of tariffs imposed on sugarcane sent to the continental United States, planters had more money to spend on equipment, land and labor. Increased capital resulted in increased production. Five kingdom-era corporations benefited from annexation, becoming multimillion-dollar conglomerations: Castle & Cooke, Alexander & Baldwin, C. Brewer & Co., Theo H. Davies & Co., and American Factors (later Amfac). Together, the five companies dominated the Hawaiian economy as the "Big Five."

== Pineapples and Hawaii ==
James Dole, also known as the Pineapple King, arrived in Hawaii in 1899. He purchased land in Wahiawa and established the first pineapple plantation in Hawaii. Confident that canned pineapples could become a popular food export, Dole built a cannery near his first plantation in 1901. Hawaiian Pineapple Company, later renamed Dole Food Company, was born. With his profits soaring, Dole expanded and built a larger cannery in Iwilei near Honolulu Harbor in 1907. The Iwilei location made his main operations more accessible to labor. The cannery at Iwilei was in operation until 1991. Dole found himself in the midst of an economic boom industry. In response to growing pineapple demand in 1922, Dole purchased the entire island of Lanai and transformed the Hawaiian tropical low shrublands into the largest pineapple plantation in the world. For a long stretch of time, Lanai would produce 75% of the world's pineapple and become immortalized as the "Pineapple Island."

By the 1930s, Hawaii became the pineapple capital of the world and pineapple production became its second largest industry. After World War II, there were a total of eight pineapple companies in Hawaii. Today pineapples are imported from Thailand and elsewhere; few are commercially grown in Hawaii.

== Race relations ==
One of the most prominent challenges territorial Hawaii had to face was race relations. Intermarriage was tolerated and even sought after. Many native women married immigrant men and joined their community. By 1898, most of Hawaii's population was made up of plantation workers from China, Japan, the Philippines, and Portugal. Their plantation experiences molded Hawaii to become a plantation culture. The Hawaiian Pidgin language was developed on the plantations so they all could understand each other. Buddhism and Shintoism grew to become large religions. Catholicism became Hawaii's largest Christian denomination.

=== Massie Trial ===
Race relations in Hawaii took to the national spotlight on September 12, 1931 when Thalia Massie, a US Navy officer's wife, got drunk and alleged that she was beaten and raped. That same night, the Honolulu Police Department stopped a car and detained five men, all plantation workers. Officers took the men to Massie's hospital bedroom where she identified them. Although evidence could not prove that the men were directly involved, national newspapers quickly ran stories about the brute locals on the prowl for white women in Hawaii. The jury in the initial trial failed to reach a verdict. One of the accused was afterwards severely beaten, while another, Joseph Kahahawai, was murdered. Police caught the Kahahawai killers: Massie's husband Thomas, mother Grace Fortescue, and two sailors. Famed criminal lawyer Clarence Darrow defended them. A jury of locals found them guilty and sentenced to hard labor for ten years. Outraged by the court's punishment, the territory's white leaders as well as 103 members of Congress signed a letter threatening to impose martial law over the territory. This pressured Governor Lawrence M. Judd to commute the sentences to an hour each in his executive chambers. Hawaii residents were shocked and all of the United States reconsidered what they thought of Hawaii's racial diversity. The term "local" (Hawaii's non-Caucasian population) was galvanized through the Massie Trial.

== Martial law ==
From 1941 to 1944, following the attack on Pearl Harbor and America's entry into World War II, Territorial Governors Joseph Poindexter and Ingram Stainback stripped themselves of their administrative powers by declaring martial law. With the territorial constitution suspended, the legislature and supreme court were also dissolved indefinitely. Military law was enforced on all residents of Hawaii. General Walter Short appointed himself military governor December 7, 1941. He assumed control of Hawaii and governed from ʻIolani Palace, which was quickly barricaded and fitted with trenches. He was relieved December 17 and charged with dereliction of duty, accused of making poor preparations in case of attack before the attack on Pearl Harbor. Major General Delos Carleton Emmons replaced him, with Lieutenant Colonel Thomas H. Green of the US Army Judge Advocate General's Corps joining his command and overseeing most of the formation of the military government.

Under martial law, every facet of Hawaiian life was under the control of the military governor. His government fingerprinted all residents over the age of six, imposed blackouts and curfews, rationed food and gasoline, censored the news and media, censored all mail, prohibited alcohol, assigned business hours, and administered traffic and special garbage collection. The military governor's laws were called General Orders. Violations meant punishment without appeal by military tribunals.

J. Garner Anthony, the civilian Attorney General October 1942 to December 1943, provides different information. The "aged and weak" Poindexter (sic), an appointed Democrat, was variously misled into surrendering his powers. Anthony does not mention fingerprinting; corroborates gasoline rationing but not food (the latter unlike the mainland); and disproves a liquor ban by showing how the military gained handsome profits by liquor permits and fees.

The military government instituted employment stasis by General Order No. 91 (no leaving an employer without a letter of good standing); and the banning of courts that required witnesses and juries. Traffic violations were said to have netted prison terms and the military courts evidenced bias against civilians. There ensued a turf battle between the federal Departments of War, Justice and Interior, in which the middle one played a mediating or flip-flopping role. Indeed, it appeared War if not the Pacific Command was operating autonomously.

The Glockner and Seifert cases, concerning two detained, naturalized Germans, tested the military's suspension of habeas corpus. In the second year of martial law, August 1943, US District Judge Metzger subpoenaed General Richardson as to why these two were held without charges. The general initially had the deputy marshal manhandled and evaded summons. Once served, instead of bringing the detained to court as ordered, the general drafted General Order No. 31, threatening the judge with fines and imprisonment for filing writs of habeas corpus. Ultimately the prisoners were released outside of Hawaii, rendering the case moot.

List of military governors:

- Walter C. Short (1941)
- Delos C. Emmons (1941–1943)
- Robert C. Richardson Jr. (1943–1944)

== Democratic Revolution of 1954 ==
The Democratic Revolution of 1954 was a nonviolent revolution consisting of general strikes, protests, and other acts of civil disobedience. The Revolution culminated in the territorial elections of 1954 where the dominance of the Hawaii Republican Party in the legislature came to an abrupt end, as it was voted out of office to be replaced by members of the Democratic Party of Hawaii.

== Hawaii 7 ==
During the years leading up to the ousting of the Republican Party, Cold War fears brewed and the U.S. was in the middle of the Second Red Scare. The FBI employed the Smith Act toward the ILWU and Communist Party of Hawaii, arresting those who would become known as the Hawaii 7 on August 28, 1951, in synchronized raids at 6:30 that morning. They were convicted in a two-year-long trial. The Hawaii 7 were eventually released in 1958:

- Jack Hall
- John Reinecke
- Koji Ariyoshi
- Jack Kimoto
- Jim Freeman
- Charles Fujimoto
- Eileen Fujimoto

== Statehood ==
The first Congressional bill for Hawaii statehood was proposed in 1919 by Kūhiō Kalanianaʻole, and was based upon the argument that World War I had proved Hawaii's loyalty. It was ignored, and proposals for Hawaii statehood were forgotten during the 1920s because the archipelago's rulers believed that sugar planters' interests would be better served if Hawaii remained a territory. Following the Jones–Costigan amendment, another statehood bill was introduced to the House in May 1935 by Samuel Wilder King but it did not come to be voted on, largely because FDR himself strongly opposed Hawaii statehood, while "Solid South" Democrats who could not accept non-white Congressmen controlled all the committees.

Hawaii resurrected the campaign in 1940 by placing the statehood question on the ballot. Two-thirds of the electorate in the territory voted in favor of joining the Union. After World War II, the call for statehood was repeated with even larger support, even from some mainland states. The reasons for the support of statehood were clear:

- Hawaii wanted the ability to elect its own governor
- Hawaii wanted the ability to vote for the U.S. president
- Hawaii wanted an end to taxation without voting representation in Congress
- Hawaii had suffered the first blow of the war
- Hawaii's non-white ethnic populations, especially the Japanese, proved their loyalty by having served on the European frontlines
- Hawaii’s population consisted of 90% United States citizens, most of them native-born.

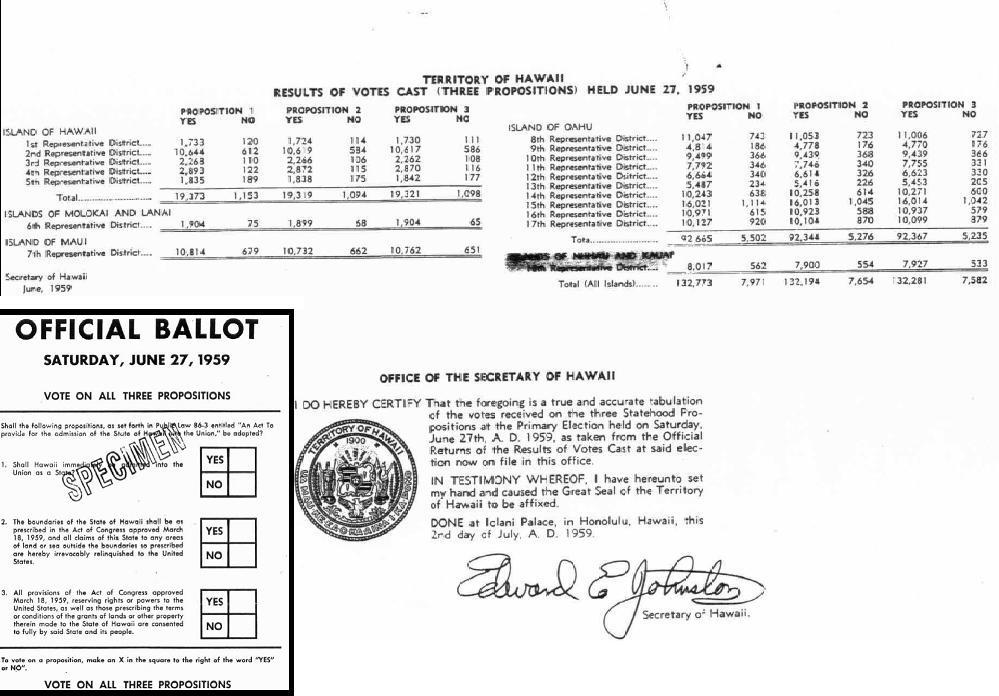
All islands voted at least 93 percent in favor of Admission acts. Ballot (inset) and referendum results for the Admission Act of 1959.

A former officer of the Honolulu Police Department, John A. Burns, was elected Hawaii's delegate to Congress in 1956. A Democrat, Burns won without the white vote but rather with the overwhelming support of Japanese and Filipinos in Hawaii. His election proved pivotal to the statehood movement. Upon arriving in Washington, D.C., Burns began making key political maneuvers by winning over allies among Congressional leaders and state governors. Burns' most important accomplishment was convincing Senate Majority Leader Lyndon B. Johnson (D-Texas) that Hawaii was ready to become a state, despite the continuing opposition of such Deep Southerners as James Eastland and John Sparkman.

In March 1959, both houses of Congress passed the Hawaii Admission Act and US President Dwight D. Eisenhower signed it into law. On June 27, 1959, a plebiscite was held asking Hawaii residents to vote on accepting the statehood bill. The plebiscite passed overwhelmingly, with 94.3% voting in favor. On August 21, church bells throughout Honolulu were rung upon the proclamation that Hawaii was finally a US state.

== See also ==
- History of Hawaii
- Historic regions of the United States
- Territorial evolution of the United States
