= Seal of Hawaii =

Official government emblem of the U.S. state of Hawaii

Great Seal of the State of Hawaii

Versions
- Seal of the Territory of Hawaii

- Seal of the Republic of Hawaii
- Armiger: State of Hawaii
- Adopted: 1959
- Motto: Ua Mau ke Ea o ka ʻĀina i ka Pono "The life of the land is perpetuated in righteousness"

Reverse of the Official Statehood medal (in silver) Commemorating the Admission of Hawaii as the 50th State of the United States of America with high relief details of the Great Seal of the State of Hawaii

The Great Seal of the State of Hawaii was designated officially by Act 272 of the 1959 Territorial Legislature and is based on the territorial seal. Modifications to the territorial seal included the use of the words "State of Hawaii" at the top and "1959" within the circle. Provisions for a seal for the state of Hawaii were enacted by the Territorial Legislature and approved by Governor William F. Quinn on June 8, 1959. The passage of the Admission Act in 1959, admitted Hawaii as the 50th State of the United States of America on August 21, 1959.

The seal of the Territory of Hawaii was the same as the seal of the republic, except that it had "Territory of Hawaii" placed at the top and "1900" (signifying the year that the territorial government officially was organized) within the circle. The 1901 Territorial Legislature authorized the modified republic seal as the Seal of the Territory of Hawaii.

The seal of the Republic of Hawaii had the words "Republic of Hawaii" at the top and "MDCCCXCIV" (1894) within the circle, for the year the republic was established. The republic’s seal was designed by Viggo Jacobsen, a Honolulu resident, and itself was derived from the Royal Arms of the Kingdom of Hawaii used in the reigns of King Kamehameha III, King Kalākaua and Queen Liliʻuokalani, which had been designed by the College of Arms in London in 1842, and officially adopted in 1845.

Royal Arms of the Kingdom of Hawaii as designed by the College of Arms

Version of the Royal Arms, adopted by the Kingdom around 1870

Version used by the Provisional Government

== State Seal ==
The Great Seal of the State of Hawaii is circular in shape, two and three-quarters inches in diameter, and of the design being described, with the tinctures added as the basis for the coat of arms. The Hawaii state seal represents Hawaii's nation.

== Coat of arms ==
Coat of arms of the State of Hawaii
- Armiger: State of Hawaii
- Adopted: August 21, 1959
- Crest: A rising sun irradiated Or.
- Shield: Quarterly, 1st and 4th, barry of eight Argent, Gules, and Azure; 2nd and 3rd, Or, a puloulou or sacred staff proper; en surtout, an inescutcheon Vert charged with a mullet Or.
- Supporters: On the dexter King Kamehameha I wearing cloak and mahiole helmet proper, on the sinister goddess Liberty wearing a Phrygian cap and laurel wreath, holding Ka Hae Hawaiʻi in her right hand partly unfurled proper.
- Compartment: Phoenix bird with wings outstretched arising from flames. The phoenix's body is black and wings half yellow and half dark red. Below the heraldic shield are eight taro leaves having on either side banana foliage and sprays of maidenhair fern trailed upwardly.
- Motto: Ua Mau ke Ea o ka ʻĀina i ka Pono (The life of the land is perpetuated in righteousness)

In the center of the seal is a heraldic shield which is quartered. The blazon is as follows

Quarterly, 1st and 4th, barry of eight Argent, Gules, and Azure; 2nd and 3rd, Or, a puloulou or sacred staff proper; en surtout, an inescutcheon Vert charged with a mullet Or.

=== Supporters design ===
On the left side is King Kamehameha I, standing in the as represented by the bronze statue in front of Aliʻiōlani Hale, Honolulu. His cloak and helmet (a mahiole) are in yellow. Kamehameha I's figure is in proper. Kamehameha I unified the Hawaiian Islands into a single united kingdom. On the right side is goddess Liberty also wearing a Phrygian cap and laurel wreath. She is holding Ka Hae Hawaiʻi in her right hand that is partly unfurled.

=== Crest design ===
A rising sun irradiated in gold surrounded by the legend "State of Hawaii, 1959" on a scroll in black lettering.

=== Motto design ===
The state motto: Ua Mau ke Ea o ka ʻĀina i ka Pono is on the scroll on the seal's bottom in gold lettering. Ua Mau ke Ea o ka ʻĀina i ka Pono is roughly translated into English as "The life of the land is perpetuated in righteousness." The motto was adopted by the Kingdom of Hawaiʻi in 1843 and was used in an address by King Kamehameha III at ceremonies following the return of his kingdom from the British. British captain Lord George Paulet of HMS Carysfort demanded that Hawaiʻi was ceded to Great Britain in response to claims of political abuses against British residents made by British Consul Richard Charlton. After Kamehameha III notified London of the captain's actions, Admiral Richard Darton Thomas returned sovereignty back to the King. The motto is also featured in Israel Kamakawiwoʻole's song "Hawaiʻi '78" and is used on the Hawaii state quarter.

=== Compartment design ===
Below the heraldic shield, the bird phoenix has it wings outstretched arising from flames. The phoenix's body is black and wings half yellow and half dark red. Below the heraldic shield are eight taro leaves having on either side banana foliage and sprays of maidenhair fern trailed upwardly.

== Symbolism ==
- 1959 represents the year of admission into the Union as a state.
- The rising sun replaced the royal crown from the original coat of arms. This represents the birth of a new state.
- King Kamehameha the Great and the Goddess of Liberty holding the Hawaiian flag replace the two warriors on the Royal Arms. This may represent the old government leader (King Kamehameha the Great) and the new government leader (The Goddess of Liberty).
- The quartered design of the heraldic shield is retained from the original coat of arms.
- The eight stripes in two of the quarters of the shield represent the eight main islands.
- The Puloʻuloʻu, or tabu ball and stick, in the second and third quarters was carried before the king and placed before the door of his home, signifying his authority and power. In the seal it is a symbol of the authority and power of the government.
- The star in the middle of the shield signifies the fiftieth star added to the United States flag.
- The phoenix, symbol of death and resurrection, symbolizes the change from an absolute monarchy to a free, democratic form of government.
- The eight taro leaves, flanked by banana foliage and maidenhair fern are typical Hawaiian flora and represent the eight main islands. Taro is the traditional staff of life and has great spiritual significance. Taro is also still cultivated and is the ingredient of the popular dish called poi.
- The state motto, "Ua Mau ke Ea o ka ʻĀina i ka Pono", "The life of the land is perpetuated in righteousness," is retained from the royal coat of arms.

== Government seals of Hawaii ==
Seal of the Hawaii Department of Transportation

== See also ==
- Coat of Arms of the Hawaiian Kingdom - The historical coat of arms of Hawaii
