= Sakamaki =

Sakamaki is a Japanese surname. Notable people with the surname include:

- Kazuo Sakamaki (1928–1999), Japanese naval officer and first prisoner of World War II in the USA
- Shunzo Sakamaki (1906–1973), Japanese-American professor of Japanese studies
- Sakamaki family, several fictitious characters in the visual novel franchise Diabolik Lovers
