= Hawaii Admission Act =

Statute which established the State of Hawaii

- Long title: An Act to provide for the admission of the State of Hawaii into the Union.
- Nicknames: Hawaii Statehood
- Enacted by: the 86th United States Congress
- Effective: March 18, 1959

Citations
- Public law: 86-3
- Statutes at Large: 73 Stat. 4

Legislative history
- Introduced in the Senate as S. 50; Passed the Senate on March 11, 1959 (76–15); Passed the House on March 12, 1959 (323–89, in lieu of H.R. 4221); Signed into law by President Dwight D. Eisenhower on March 18, 1959

The Admission Act, formally An Act to Provide for the Admission of the State of Hawaii into the Union (Pub. L. 86–3, 73 Stat. 4, enacted March 18, 1959) is a statute enacted by the United States Congress and signed into law by President Dwight D. Eisenhower which dissolved the Territory of Hawaii and established the State of Hawaii as the 50th state to be admitted into the Union. Statehood became effective on August 21, 1959. Hawaii remains the most recent state to join the United States.

== Hawaii statehood and international law ==
Prior to 1959, Hawaii was an organized incorporated territory of the United States. The territory was established in 1900 by the Hawaiian Organic Act. In 1946, the United Nations listed Hawaii as a non-self-governing territory under the administration of the United States (Resolution 55(I) of 1946-12-14). Also listed as non-self-governing territories under the jurisdiction of the United States were American Samoa, Guam, the Panama Canal Zone, Puerto Rico, the Territory of Alaska, and the United States Virgin Islands.

== Statehood vote ==
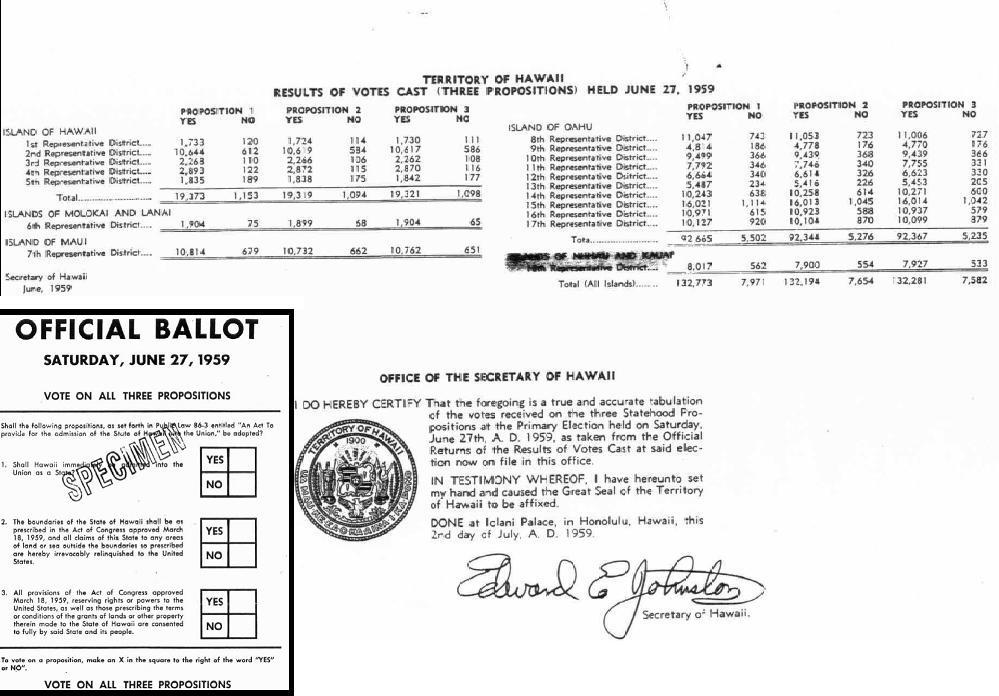
A copy of an official ballot (inset) and referendum results approving the Admission Act

Out of a total population of 600,000 in the islands and 155,000 registered voters, on June 27, 1959 a plebiscite election had 140,000 votes cast, the highest turnout ever in Hawaii. The vote showed approval rates of at least 93% by voters on all major islands. Of the approximately 140,000 votes cast, fewer than 8,000 rejected the Admission Act of 1959.

=== Opposition to statehood ===
The acceptance of statehood for Hawaii was not without its share of controversy. There were Native Hawaiians who protested against statehood. Prior to admission, various bills creating the state were stalled in congressional hearings since the early 1900s. There was a fear of establishing a state with an Asian American plurality. Some lawmakers worried about the addition of Hawaii's residents to the United States, in light of protests and possibly split loyalties.

Upon the election of John A. Burns from the Hawaii Democratic Party as delegate of the Territory of Hawaii to Congress, southern leaders charged that Burns' election was evidence of Hawaii as a haven for communism. Burns, in 1959, would reflect on the obstacles against the statehood campaign and place more emphasis on the resistance to statehood in the islands, rather than in Washington itself.

The reasons why Hawaii did not achieve statehood, say, ten years ago—and one could without much exaggeration say sixty years ago—lie not in the Congress but in Hawaii. The most effective opposition to statehood has always originated in Hawaii itself. For the most part it has remained under cover and has marched under other banners. Such opposition could not afford to disclose itself, since it was so decidedly against the interests and desires of Hawaii's people generally.

==== Southern lawmakers ====
Burns was involved in vigorous lobbying of his colleagues persuading them that the race-based objections were unfair and charges that Communist sympathizers controlled Hawaii were false. Minutes from Johnson's tenure as head of the Senate Democratic Policy Committee indicate he conceded on the issue to the segregationist Senator Richard Russell.

==== Alice Kamokila Campbell ====
On the 53rd anniversary of the overthrow of the Hawaiian Kingdom, January 17, 1946, Territorial Senator Alice Kamokila Campbell, one of the few voices that opposed statehood for Hawaii, offered her testimony to the joint congressional committee sent to investigate and report on statehood. Kamokila Campbell testified at Iolani Palace in front of a small crowd of 600 to frequent applause. There she stated:

I do not feel...we should forfeit the traditional rights and privileges of the natives of our islands for a mere thimbleful of votes in Congress, that we, the lovers of Hawaii from long association with it should sacrifice our birthright for the greed of alien desires to remain on our shores, that we should satisfy the thirst for power and control of some inflated industrialists and politicians who hide under the guise of friends of Hawaii, yet still keeping an eagle eye on the financial and political pressure button of subjugation over the people in general of these islands.

In 1947, Kamokila Campbell opened the Anti-Statehood Clearing House, where she sent "anti-statehood information, reports and arguments to congress."

On March 29, 1949, Kamokila Campbell successfully sued the Hawaii Statehood Commission, to stop them from spending public money to lobby for statehood, invalidating a single section of the Act which created the Hawaii Statehood Commission.

== Formation of the state ==
The State of Hawaii's territory was defined thus in the Act:

The State of Hawaii shall consist of all the islands, together with their appurtenant reefs and territorial waters, included in the Territory of Hawaii on the date of enactment of this Act, except the atoll known as Palmyra Island, together with its appurtenant reefs and territorial waters, but said State shall not be deemed to include the Midway Islands, Johnston Island, Sand Island (off-shore from Johnston Island), or Kingman Reef, together with their appurtenant reefs and territorial waters.
