= Arthur Rutledge (trade unionist) =

Arthur Abraham Rutledge (January 2, 1907–September 1997) was an American trade unionist.

== Early life ==
Rutledge was born Avrom Rotlieder in Lublin, Poland on January 2, 1907. He moved to the United States in 1913, where he changed his name to Arthur Rutledge. When he was 14 years old he became a cabin boy on a ship that sailed between Seattle and Alaska. In 1934 he stowed away on a ship and came to Hawaii after seeing a painting of the islands in a Seattle bar. He was sent back to Seattle to pay a $500 fine for bootlegging, but returned to Hawaii after paying his fine in 1938.

== Career ==
In 1939 Rutledge became the chief officer of the Local 5, a healthcare and hospitality union. He also worked as a bartender, and led his first successful strike in 1941. He later also headed the local Teamsters chapter. After World War II he unsuccessfully ran for office. In the 1950s Rutledge was nearly deported because he had illegally immigrated to the United States, but was allowed to remain after Hawaii businessmen spoke out on his behalf and he was pardoned by Oren Long. He became a citizen in 1960.

Rutledge founded Unity House, a nonprofit organization that supports Hawaii's workers, in 1951. Rutledge opened the Waikiki Marina in the 1970s.

Richard Tam was elected head of the Local 5 in 1978, replacing Rutledge. In 1980 Rutledge was accused of murder, but the charge was later acquitted when a witness testified that he had lied to the police. Rutledge was then summoned to Washington DC in 1982 as part of an investigation of the relationship between the unions he led and organized crime. A Senate report concluded that organized crime had a "substantial influence" over the Local 5. Tam also filed several suits against Rutledge regarding Unity House's finances during this period. No longer head of the Local 5, Rutledge turned his focus to expanding the Teamster's union.

Rutledge's son Tony became head of the Local 5 in 1986, and took control of Unity House in 1990. Art Rutledge died in 1997.

== See also ==
- Jack Wayne Hall
