= Karl Yoneda =

Japanese-American activist (1906–1999)

- 米田剛三
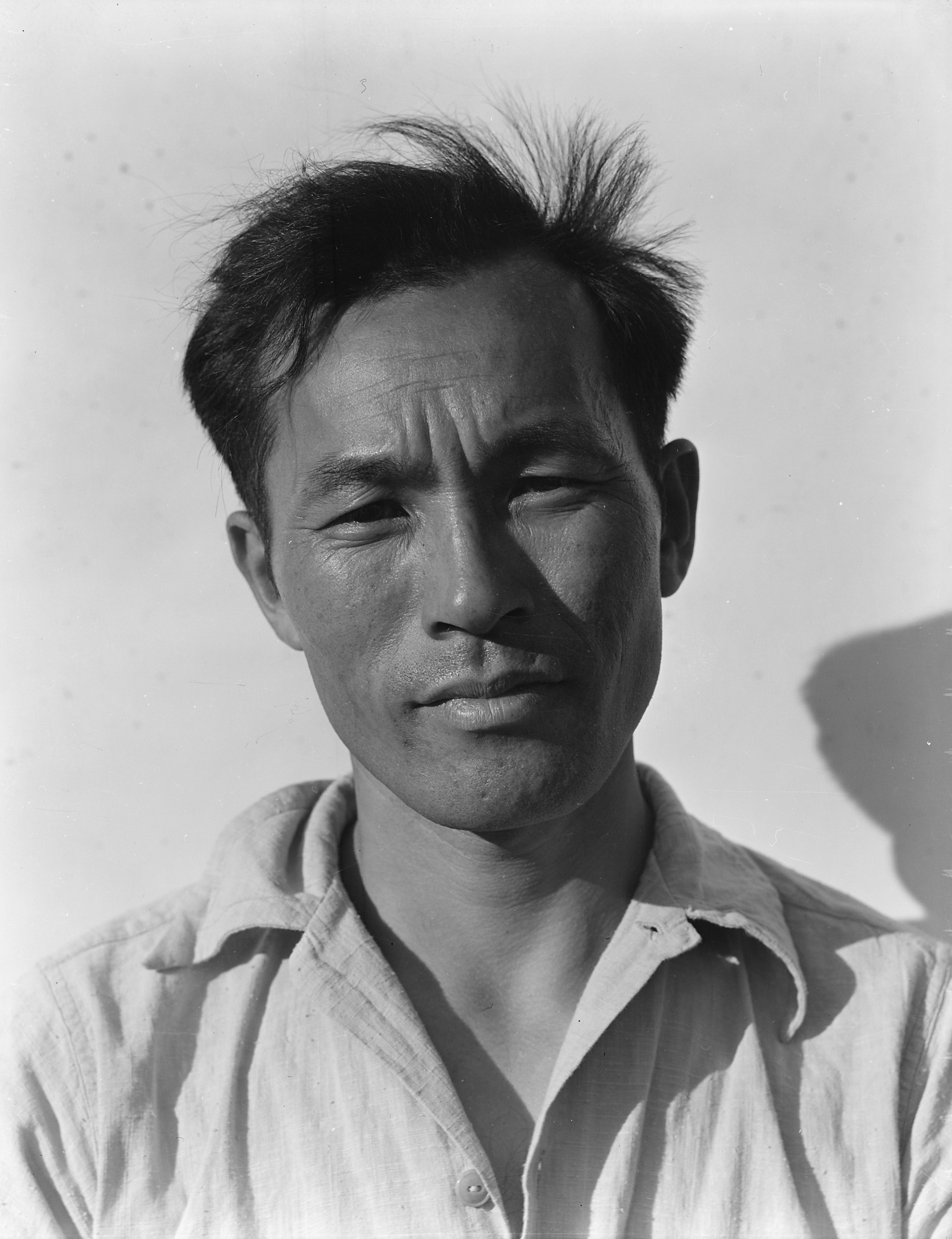
- Portrait by Dorothea Lange, 1942
- Born: Goso Yoneda; July 15, 1906; Glendale, California, U.S.
- Died: May 8, 1999 (aged 92); San Francisco, California, U.S.
- Known for: International Longshore and Warehouse Union; Communist Party organizer
- Political party: Communist Party USA
- Spouse: Elaine Black Yoneda (m. 1935; died 1988)
- Military career
- Allegiance: United States of America
- Branch: United States Army
- Service years: 1942–1945
- Rank: Sergeant
- Unit: Military Intelligence Service
- Conflicts: World War II; Pacific War; China Burma India Theater

Karl Gozo Yoneda (米田 剛三, Yoneda Gōzō; July 15, 1906 – May 8, 1999) was a Japanese American activist, union organizer, World War II veteran and author. He played a substantial role in the founding of the International Longshore and Warehouse Union.

== Early life ==
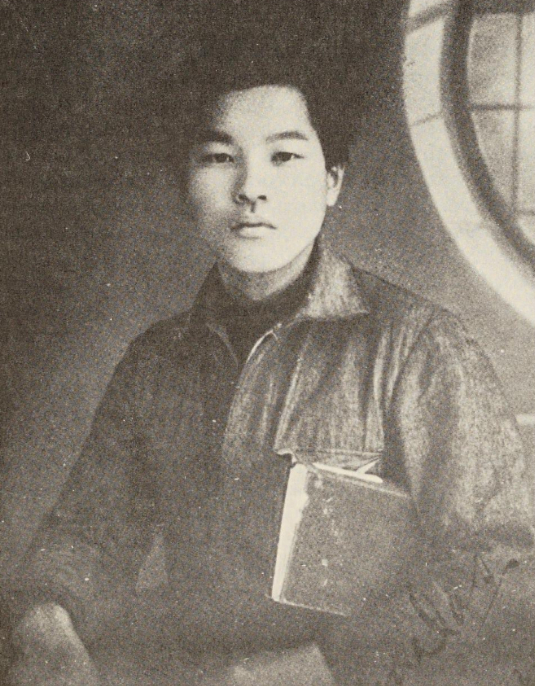
Karl Yoneda carrying Kropotkin's Memoirs of a Revolutionist in Hiroshima, 1923

Born in Glendale, California in 1906 to Japanese immigrants, Hideo and Kazu. In 1913, Yoneda's father, now diagnosed with tuberculosis, took the family to Japan to live in their native village just outside Hiroshima. His father died two years later, leaving his mother to raise him and his two sisters.

After World War I, Yoneda went to high school in Hiroshima. When he was 15, he organized a strike among the delivery boys of the powerful Chugoku Shimbun newspaper. The company had increased the delivery routes without increasing pay.

Such experiences led Yoneda to progressive ideas. He began reading the works of anarchists and socialists such as Karl Marx, Engels, Kropotkin, Bakunin, and the blind anarchist poet Vasili Eroshenko, whom he hitch-hiked to meet in Beijing when he was 16 years old. He stayed with Eroshenko two months and went back to Japan. There, he participated in workers strikes and began publishing a journal for poor farmers, Tsuchi. For that, he was beaten and thrown into jail.

== Activist life in the U.S. ==
In 1926, Yoneda returned to the U.S. rather than be drafted into the imperial army. On entering the U.S., though he was an American citizen carrying his birth certificate, he was detained at the Immigration Detention House on Angel Island in San Francisco Bay for two months.

He changed his name to Karl to honor Karl Marx and worked as a dish washer and window washer in Los Angeles for $5 a day. He became involved with the Communist Party and the Los Angeles Japanese Workers Association. About that period, he wrote:

I was a young dreamer back then, you know, the utopian type. The Plaza was my very first experience with mass demonstrations. It was easy to go over there because you felt like you were with your own kind of people—no dressed-up people there, nobody was wearing neckties.

When Japan invaded China in 1929, he returned to Japan to protest against the invasion. Marching with the most militant groups, he narrowly escaped being arrested and returned to the U.S.

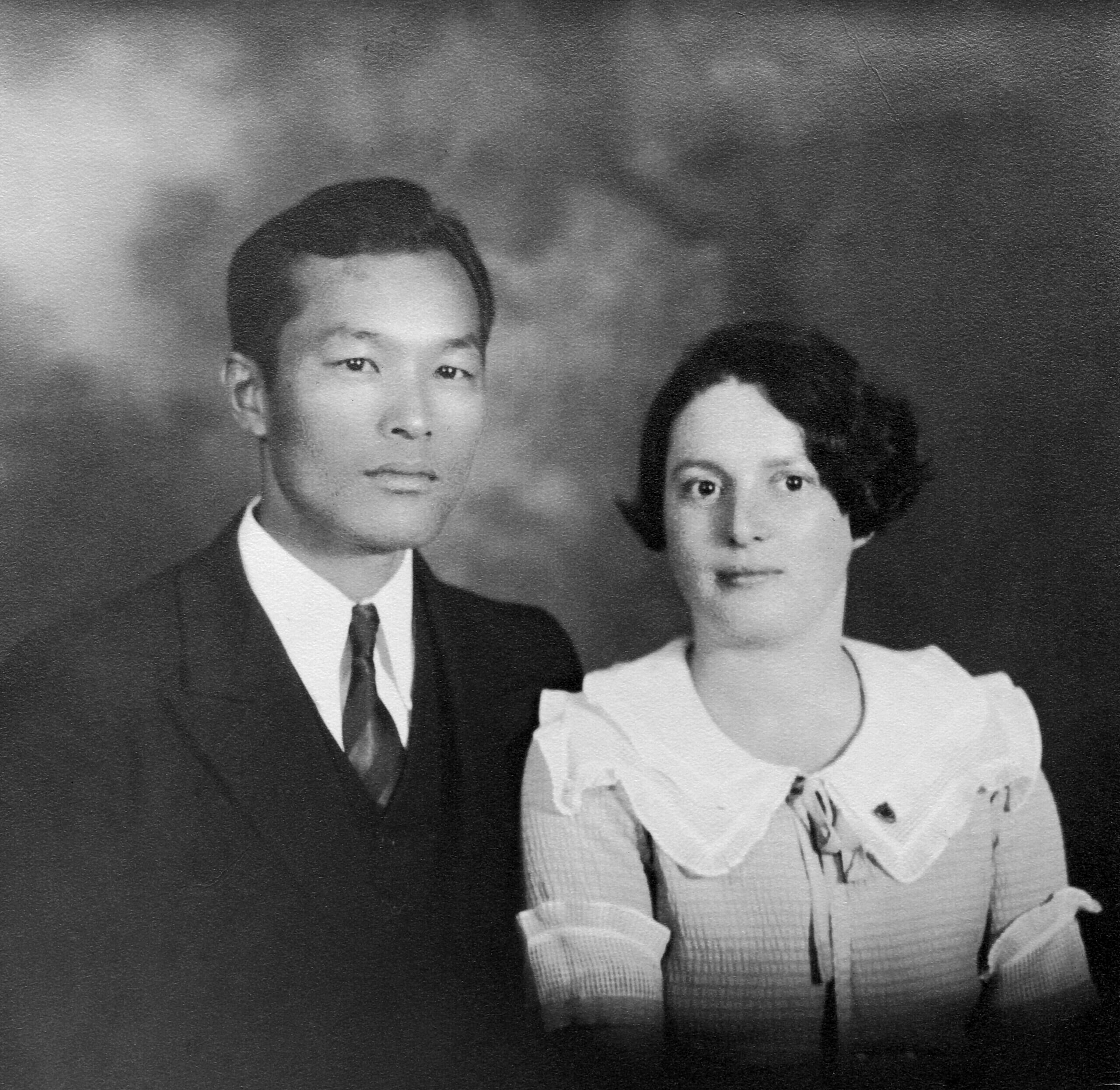
Karl Yoneda and Elaine Buchman in Los Angeles, March 1933

At a march in Los Angeles in 1931, the police "Red Squad" severely beat him and threw him in a jail cell. The chief called Elaine Buchman, whom the police called the "Red Angel" for her work in helping strikers, rushed over, bailed him out, and took him to a hospital, saving his life. The couple soon fell in love. They could not get married, however, because of California's Anti-miscegenation laws. They borrowed money for a ticket to Seattle, where they were married in 1935.

They participated in the largest demonstrations in the city's history. In 1933, after he spoke out against the tactics of the Red Squad before the L.A. City Council, the squad caught him in an elevator and gave him the worst beating of his life. During his three-month recovery, Elaine went to San Francisco to work for the International Labor Defense group. He was offered the job of editing the Japanese Communist publication Rodo Shimbun and moved to San Francisco to take it.

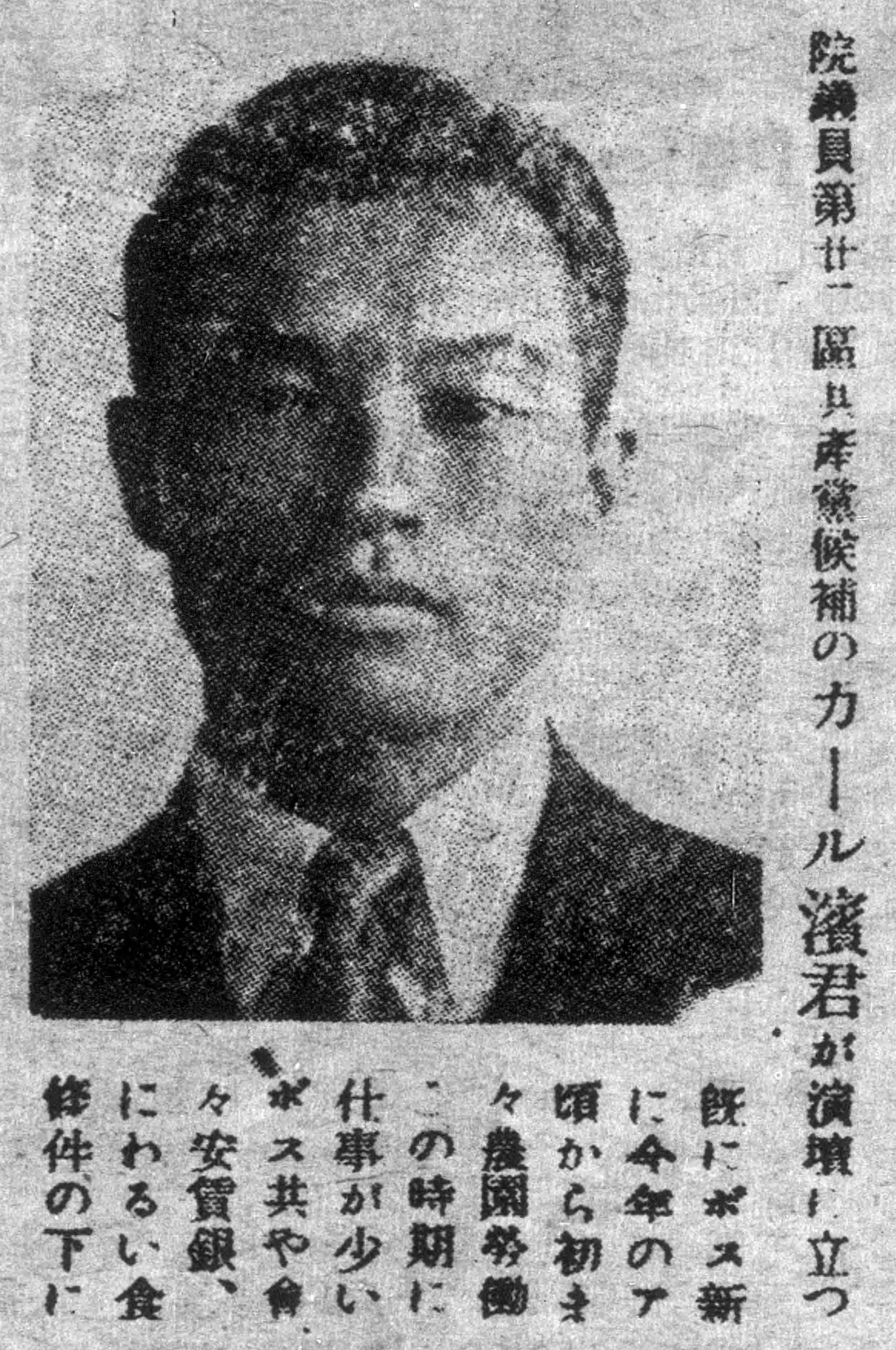
A section of a leaflet issued by the Japanese Agricultural Workers Union Organizing Committee announcing a mass meeting of asparagus workers in Sacramento, California, 1935

In May 1934, they helped organize and participate in a longshoremen's strike in San Francisco. The bosses and police, determined to stop the strike, opened fire on the strikers, killing two and wounding several others. Later that year, Yoneda was the Communist Party candidate for State Assembly in the 22nd district, coming in a distant third place with just over a thousand votes, or 3.6%. In 1938, Karl went to Washington State to help organize Alaska cannery workers.

== World War II and after ==
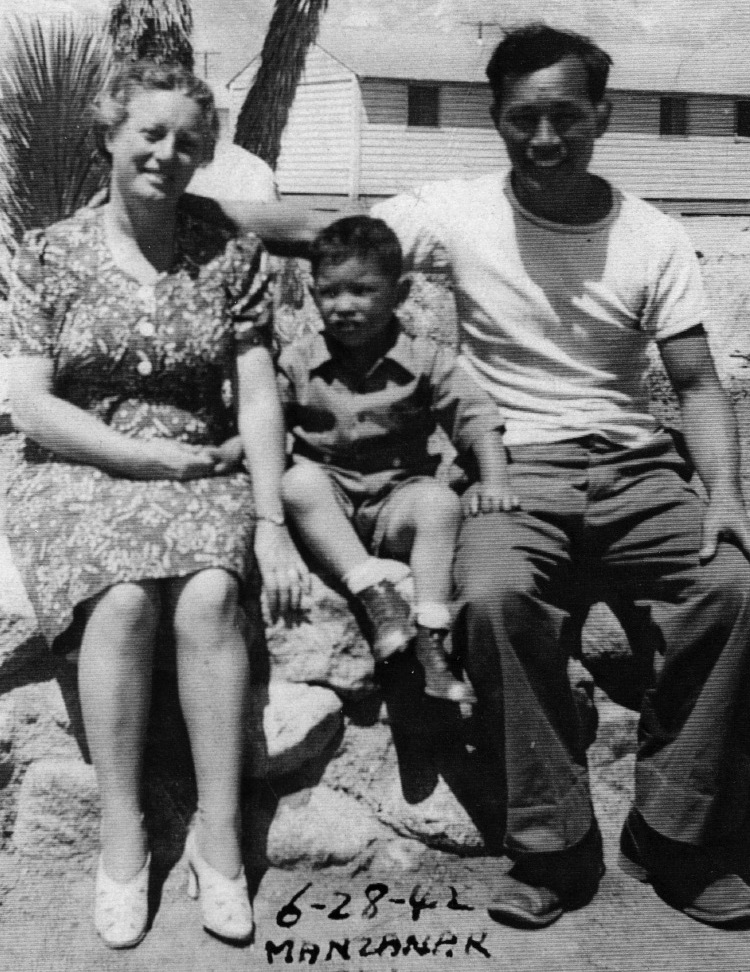
Yoneda with his wife and son at Manzanar, June 28, 1942

In 1942, Karl, Elaine, and son Tom were incarcerated at Manzanar following the signing of Executive Order 9066. Karl registered for the draft and joined the army in November. He served in the United States Military Intelligence Service as a Japanese language specialist in China, Burma and India. He served valiantly and was decorated several times.

After the war, Elaine and Karl continued to work throughout their lives for the unions and anti-war efforts. His mother had survived the atom bomb. In 1960, they visited her on the occasion of attending a peace conference in Tokyo.

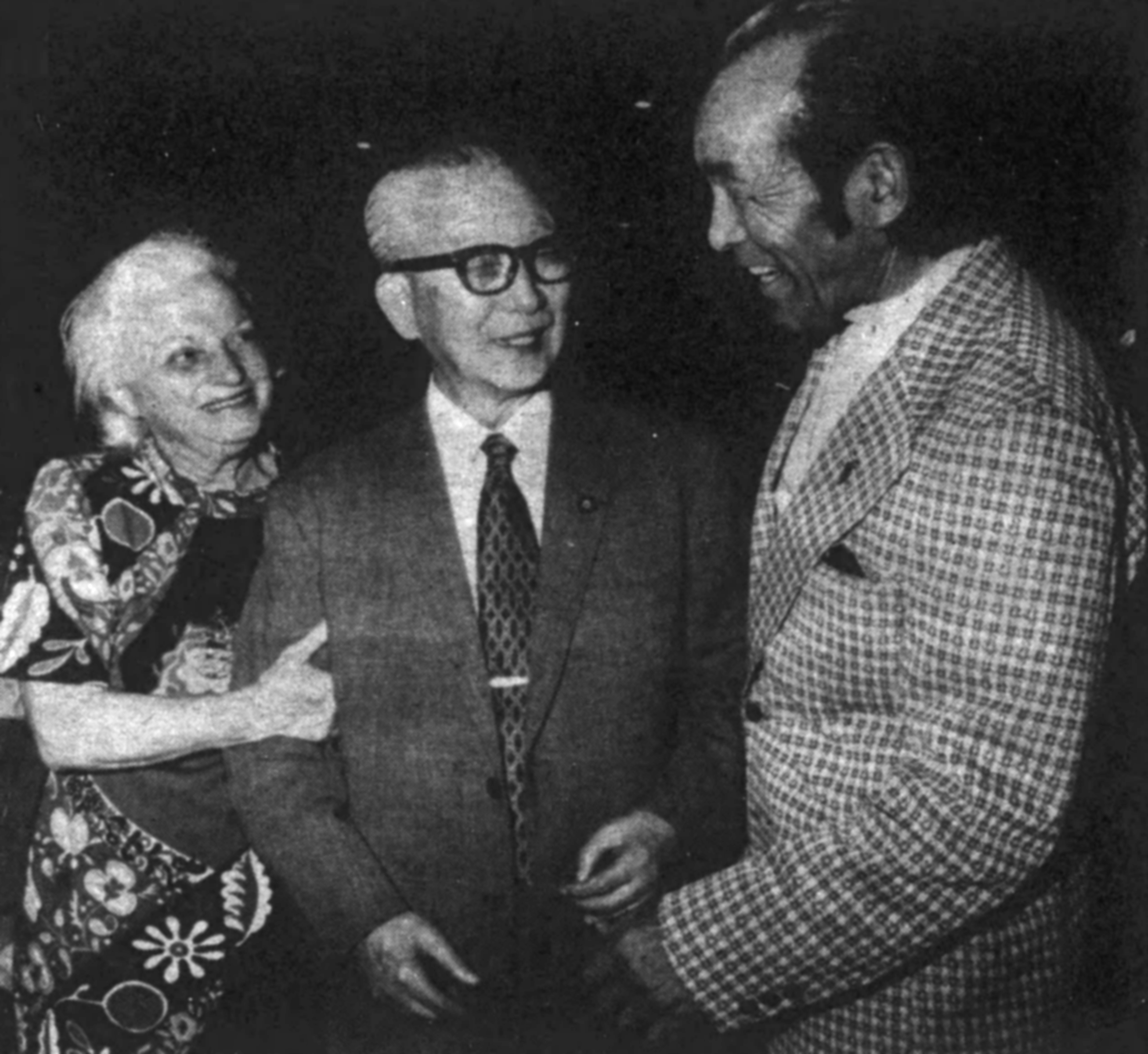
JCP Leader Sanzo Nosaka (center) greets Elaine and Karl Yoneda at a symposium in Tokyo, July 1972

After he retired in 1972, he continued to organize and work for human rights. He lectured, wrote articles and an autobiography, and kept his membership in the Communist Party. His wife died in 1988, and he died on May 8, 1999.

== Works ==
- Ganbatte: Sixty-Year Struggle of a Kibei Worker. (1983). Los Angeles: Asian American Studies Center, University of California.

== See also ==
- Japanese resistance to the Empire of Japan (1937–1945)
- Koji Ariyoshi
- Elaine Black Yoneda
