= Shunzo Sakamaki =

Shunzo Sakamaki (Japanese: 坂巻 駿三; July 15, 1906 – July 19, 1973) was a Japanese studies professor at the University of Hawaiʻi. Sakamaki Hall, where the History department at the University of Hawaiʻi is housed, was built after his death and named in his honor.

== Early life and education ==
Sakamaki was born on July 15, 1906, in Keeau to Juzaburo and Haru Sakamaki. During the sugar strikes in the 1920s their home was dynamited after Juzaburo, an interpreter, sided with the Olaʻa Sugar Plantation managers.

Sakamaki was raised as a Christian, which was unusual given that most other Japanese Americans in Hawaii at the time had maintained their Buddhist or Shintoist beliefs. He graduated from Hilo High School in 1923 and went on to study at the University of Hawaiʻi. In 1927, his debate team won against Oxford University's team. Sakamaki also performed in plays, worked at the school newspaper, competed in speech contests, and was the president of the Japanese Students' Association.

After graduating from the University of Hawaiʻi, Sakamaki received the Friend of Peace scholarship and studied at Doshisha University from 1928 to 1930. While there, he also taught English to Doshisha students as a "student professor". He returned to Hawaii in 1931 and taught at the Mid-Pacific Institute.

== University of Hawaiʻi ==
A few years after teaching at MidPac, he was hired at the University of Hawaiʻi to teach Tasuku Harada's classes when he retired. In 1939, he earned a Ph.D. at Columbia University.

During World War II, he was the chairman of the board of directors for the Oahu Citizens Committee for Home Defense. He worked to make it easier for dual citizens to renounce their Japanese citizenship so that they could serve in the military. Sakamaki was an intermediary between the FBI and the Japanese community. While he believed that most local Japanese were loyal to the United States, he suggested the internment of Shinto priests because of the role of the Emperor in Shintoism.

In 1950, the Honolulu Record pointed out that Sakamaki, despite numerous years of service, had not been granted tenure. Newspaper editor Koji Ariyoshi suspected that it was because Sakamaki was Japanese. In 1953, Sakamaki was promoted to a full professor, and was the first Asian American to have that position at the university. He served as the dean of summer sessions from 1955 onward. During his tenure as dean, the number of classes offered over the summer increased from 160 to 1,100 and the number of students enrolled increased from 7,800 in 1960 to 20,600 by 1968.

While teaching at the university he expanded Japan and Asian Studies-related courses. Much of his research was on Ryukyuan culture. In the 1960s, he bought a collection of books from the estate of Frank Hawley, a British linguist, which was then added to Sakamaki's own collection. He gave the entire collection to Hamilton Library when he retired in 1971 after being diagnosed with throat cancer.

== Legacy ==
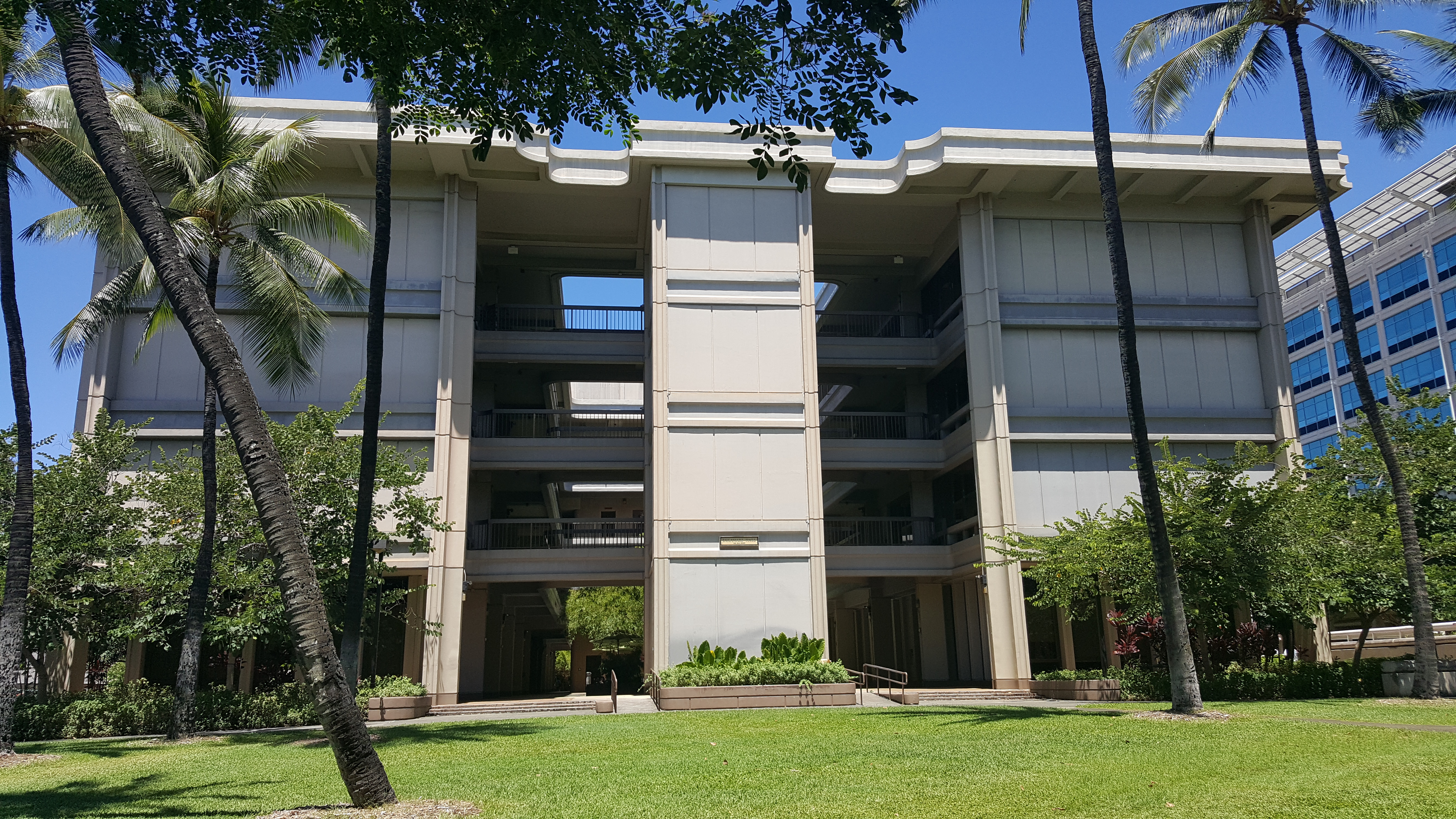
Sakamaki Hall

Sakamaki died in 1973. Sakamaki Hall was built and named after him in 1977.

== Selected bibliography ==
- Sakamaki, Shunzo, (1963). Ryukyu: a bibliographical guide to Okinawan studies; surveying important primary sources and writings in Ryukyuan, Japanese, Chinese, and Korean. Honolulu: University of Hawaiʻi Press.
- Sakamaki, Shunzo, (1964). Ryukyuan names : monographs on and lists of personal and place names in the Ryukyus. Honolulu: East-West Center Press.
