= Tasuku Harada =

Japanese pastor (1863–1940)

- 原田助
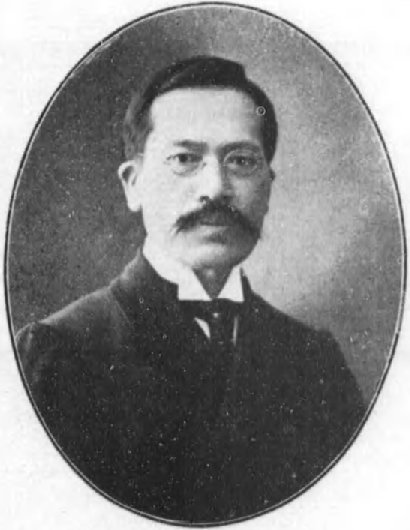
- Harada in 1913
- Pronunciation: Harada Tasuku
- Born: December 20, 1863; Kumamoto, Japan
- Died: February 21, 1940 (aged 76); Kyoto, Japan
- Education: Yale University
- Children: 4

Tasuku Harada (原田 助) (December 20, 1863 – February 21, 1940) was a Japanese pastor and the president of Doshisha University from 1907 to 1919. Harada started the University of Hawaii's Japanese Studies department in 1922.

== Early life ==
Harada was born in what is now Kumamoto, Japan in 1863. As a child he studied under Leroy Lansing Janes and converted to Christianity. He entered Doshisha University in 1880 and studied under Jo Niijima. He was baptized in 1881 and ordained as a pastor in 1885. He then served as the pastor of a church in Kobe until 1888. Harada then studied in America at the University of Chicago and Yale University, and graduated from the latter in 1890. He then went even further abroad to study in England and Germany.

Harada had four children.

== Career ==
In 1896, Harada returned to Japan and headed several churches, edited the Tokyo-based Christian World, and continued travelling abroad. He then served as president of Doshisha University from 1907 to 1919, during which enrollment tripled and the university became officially accredited. However, in 1919 he resigned after enduring criticism about his focus on mission work and travels overseas.

After resigning, Harada gave lectures in Europe and the United States. Though there was a lot of anti-Japanese sentiment at the time because of the Oahu sugar strikes, he lectured in Honolulu and was offered a professorship at the University of Hawaii. After returning to Kyoto to think about it, he accepted the offer and moved to Hawaii with his wife and four of his children. He started the University of Hawaii's Japanese Studies department in 1922, and was the dean of the department until 1932. Shunzo Sakamaki and Yukuo Uyehara took over after Harada retired.

While working in Hawaii, Harada was also affiliated with the Pan-Pacific Union (PPU) and the Institute of Pacific Relations (IPR).

Harada died in Kyoto on February 21, 1940, after years of illness. He has received honorary degrees from the University of Edinburgh, Amherst College, and the University of Hawaii.
