= Elaine Black Yoneda =

American labor and civil rights activist

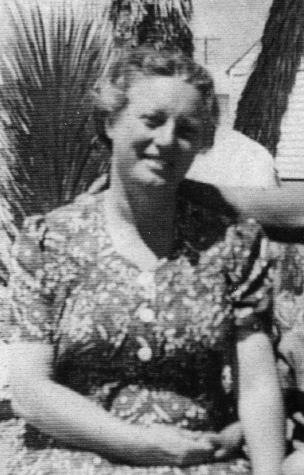
- Yoneda in 1942
- Born: Elaine Rose Buchman; September 4, 1906; New York City, U.S.
- Died: May 29, 1988 (aged 81); San Francisco, California, U.S.
- Education: San Diego High School
- Occupations: Labor and civil rights activist
- Political party: Communist Party USA
- Spouses: Edward Francis Russell, Jr. (m. 1925, separated) Karl Yoneda (m. 1935)
- Children: 2

Elaine Black Yoneda (September 4, 1906 – May 29, 1988) was an American labor and civil rights activist, member of the Communist Party and candidate for political office in California.

== Early years ==
Yoneda was born Rose Elaine Buchman in New York City to Russian Jewish immigrants Nathan and Mollie Buchman. Her parents, child laborers in a Ukraine match factory, had from an early age been active in the Jewish Labor Bund. The two fled Tsarist Russia in 1902, and Yoneda was born shortly after their arrival in the United States in 1906. The family eventually settled in Brooklyn, New York. In 1920 Yoneda's family moved to Lemon Grove, California, and then San Diego where her father ran a dry goods store and Elaine attended San Diego High School. By 1924 the family was living in Los Angeles, where Yoneda helped out in the family clothing store and completed secretarial training. She attended a meeting of the Young Workers League at the encouragement of her parents, where she met Edward Francis Russell, Jr. They married in 1925 and Yoneda gave birth to their daughter Joyce in 1927.

== Politicization ==
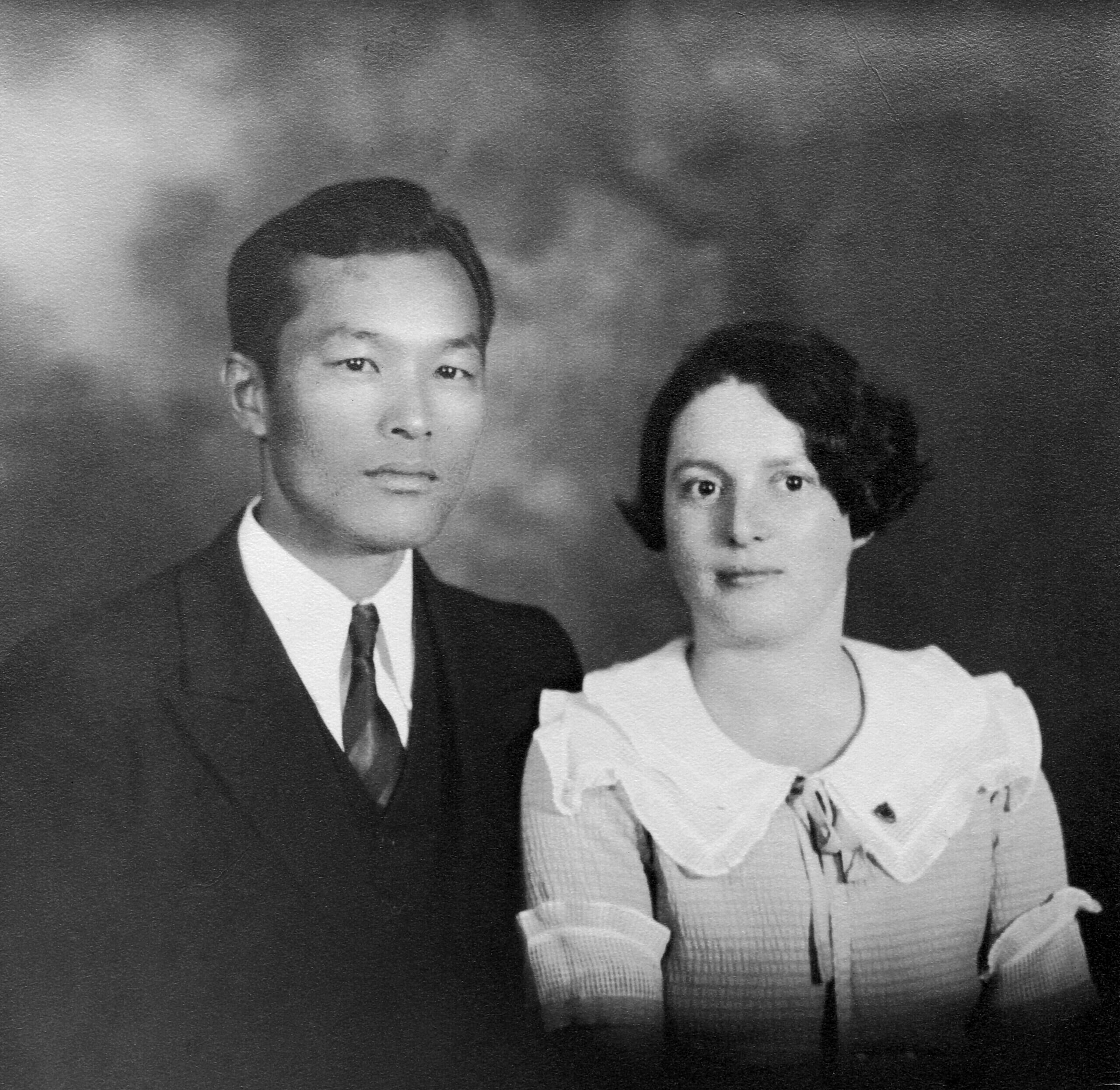
Karl Yoneda and Elaine Buchman in Los Angeles, March 1933

In 1930 Yoneda became active in the labor movement after observing a demonstration in which the Los Angeles Red Squad assaulted an elderly woman. During a subsequent police interrogation, she spontaneously adapted her husband Edward's nickname "Blackie" as the fictitious surname "Black" for the two of them. She would continue to use Black as her public surname from that point onward.

Yoneda joined the International Labor Defense (ILD) and by 1931 she was working for the ILD office as a clerical worker. As part of her duties, Yoneda bailed out Japanese American demonstrator Karl "Hama" Yoneda, who had been beaten and arrested by the Los Angeles Police Department. Shortly thereafter, Yoneda separated from Edward Russell and began her relationship with Karl. Elaine and Karl were together for a number of years prior to their marriage in 1935 in Seattle, Washington; anti-miscegenation laws in California made it illegal for them to marry in California.

After relocating to San Francisco in 1933, Yoneda continued her activities in the civil rights, labor, and union movements, and also joined the Communist Party and worked for the ILD as a district secretary. Yoneda's work with the ILD included supporting striking agricultural workers and visiting prisoners such as Tom Mooney and others who had been arrested under the Criminal Syndicalism laws.

Yoneda herself was arrested a number of times, including in Dolores Park, San Francisco, for participating in a rally against the Criminal Syndicalism laws in March 1935. Yoneda became known as the “Red Angel” for her work in defending union members and labor demonstrators in the San Francisco waterfront and General Strike of 1934. She was the only woman on the steering committee of the 1934 General Strike. Yoneda participated in many high-profile labor and civil rights activities such as the Salinas Lettuce Strike, National Scottsboro Week and Spanish Civil War relief. She ran for the San Francisco Board of Supervisors in 1939 on a platform of free day care, low cost housing, and civil rights. She was defeated.

== Incarceration ==
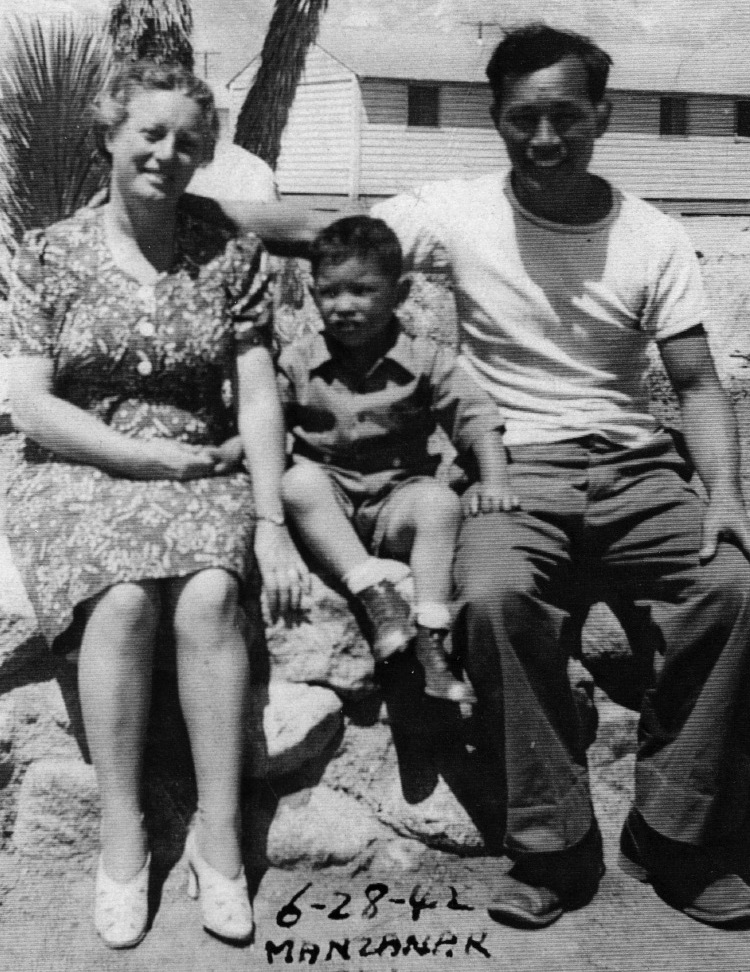
Yoneda with her husband Karl and son Tommy at Manzanar, 1942

After the bombing of Pearl Harbor in 1941, Yoneda's husband and the couple's two-year-old son, Tommy, were excluded from the West Coast and required to be incarcerated at a concentration camp in Manzanar, California. Yoneda entrusted her daughter Joyce into the care of her parents and insisted on accompanying Karl and Tommy in the camp. During this period of Japanese American exclusion and incarceration, there was a small but significant number of non-Japanese Americans in the concentration camps in the United States. Most, like Elaine, were the spouses of Japanese Americans.

At camp, Karl and Elaine were subject to regular threats of violence for their non-opposition to Japanese American exclusion and incarceration, and for the compliance with camp authorities. Eventually Karl was allowed to enlist in the U.S. Army and was sent to Burma to work with the Military Intelligence Service. Following his departure, there was a violent revolt at Manzanar carried out by those who resisted incarceration. Elaine and Tommy's lives were threatened, and so she was allowed to move back to San Francisco with her son.

== Later years and death ==
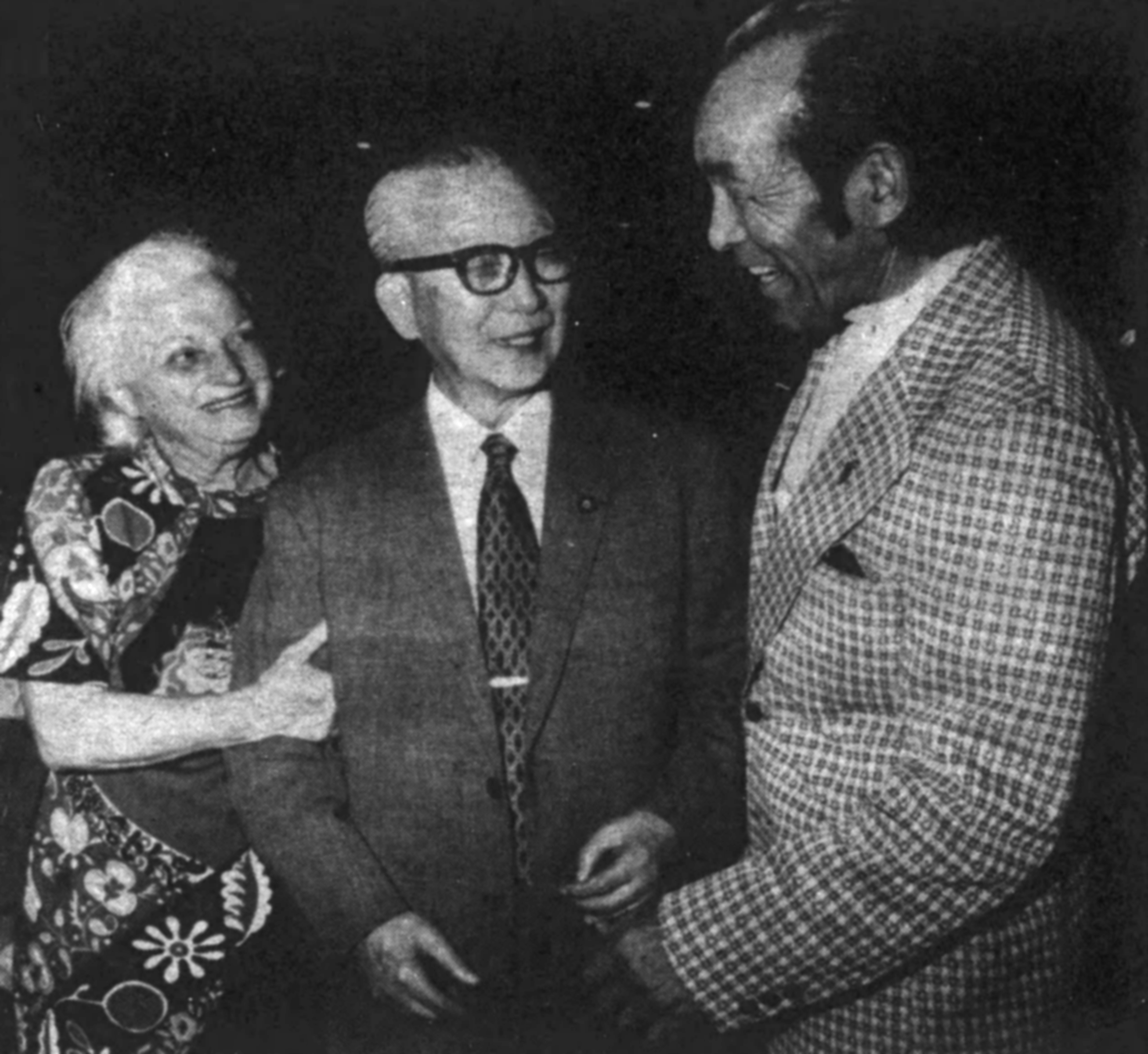
Japanese communist Sanzō Nosaka (center) greets American communists Yoneda and her husband Karl at a symposium in Tokyo, July 1972

After the war, the family purchased a chicken ranch near Petaluma, California. Yoneda kept up her activities in labor and civil rights movements, acting as chair for the Sonoma chapter of the Civil Rights Congress. The farm was sold in 1960 and the family returned to San Francisco. She remained involved with a variety of labor organizations, including the International Longshore and Warehouse Union's Women's Auxiliary and the Office Workers Union, and also participated in peace movements and various civil rights cases, including the Wilmington Ten. The Yoneda family made annual trips to Manzanar and were active with the Japanese American Citizens League in campaigning for redress and reparations for Japanese Americans incarcerated during World War II.

Yoneda attended a longshoremen's rally supporting the Rev. Jesse Jackson's presidential campaign the day before she died of a heart attack on May 29, 1988.
