= Pūloʻuloʻu =

Hawaiian regalia

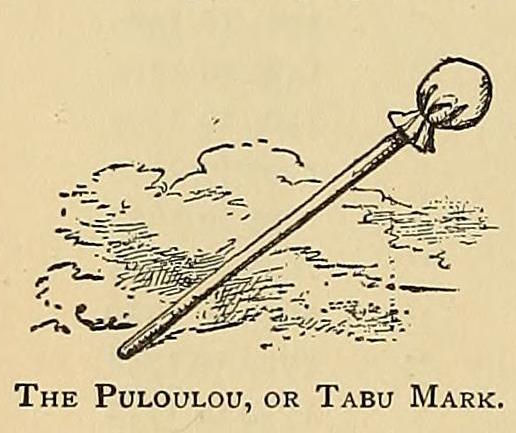
Illustration of pūloʻuloʻu in King Kalākaua's book The Legends and Myths of Hawaii: The Fables and Folklore of a Strange People, 1888

Pūloʻuloʻu, often called "kapu sticks", are symbols denoting the kapu of Hawaiian aliʻi (chiefs or royals) and symbolizing the deceased ancestors of the aliʻi. They are traditional symbols of authority which are used in modern times including the Seal of the State of Hawaii.

== History ==
Pūloʻuloʻu are often called "kapu sticks". They were symbol of the authority and protection of the aliʻi (chiefs) of Ancient Hawaii and also represented the mana (spiritual power) of the aliʻi. It was made by wrapping bundles of kapa cloth on a stick. They were given ancestral names and placed in areas of prominence. They represented the ancestors of an aliʻi who had died and return from Po (heaven). The round shape denoted the shape of stars as seen from the traditional Hawaiian perspective. They often contain the relics of deceased ancestors such as bones, teeth, hair and other important remains. Their use as symbols of the kapu was introduced by Paʻao, a high priest (kahuna nui) from Kahiki.

The pūloʻuloʻu were often placed at the residence of the aliʻi, at a heiau (temple) and at the burial sites of the aliʻi. Whaling captain Alfred N. Tripp gave King Kalākaua a pūloʻuloʻu made of a narwhal tusk on the occasion of the king's 1883 coronation. The tusk, which measured seven feet two inches, was capped with a golden sphere and is currently displayed in the throne room of ʻIolani Palace between the two thrones of Kalākaua and Queen Kapiʻolani. The pūloʻuloʻu are also displayed at the Royal Mausoleum of Hawaii at Mauna ʻAla where they are placed in the chapel and where metal representations are placed outside the chapels and the crypts.

The coat of arms of the Hawaiian Kingdom and the seal of the State of Hawaii features the pūloʻuloʻu as a symbol of authority.

== Gallery ==
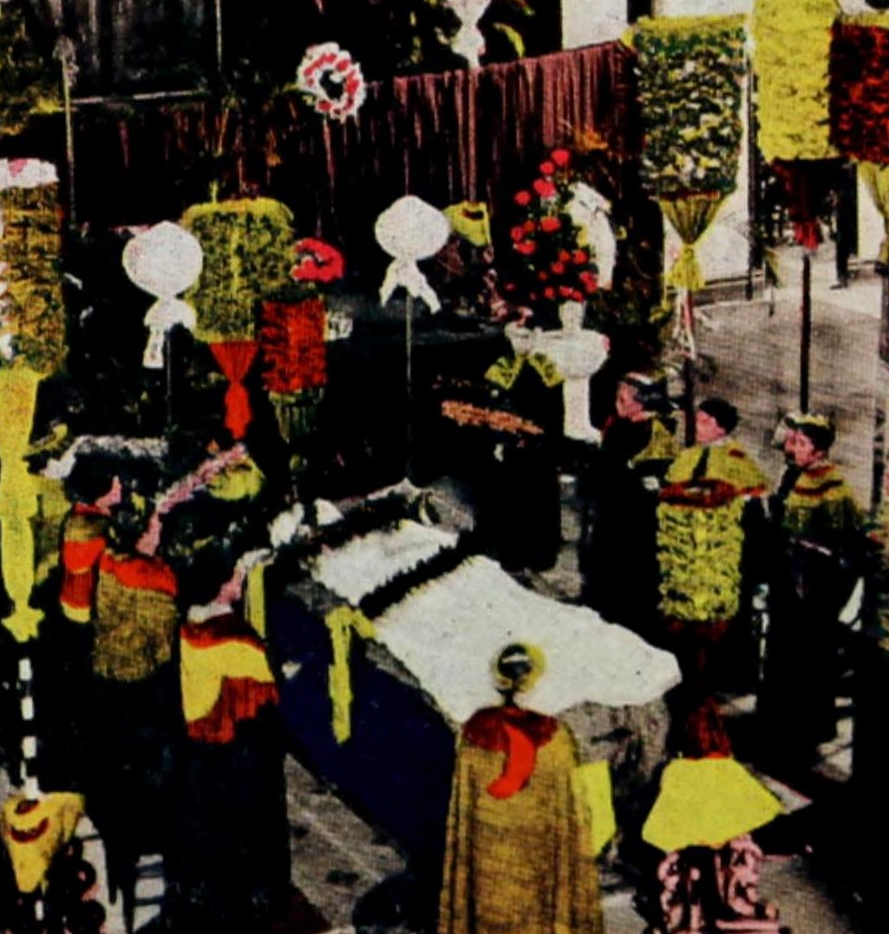
Pūloʻuloʻu used at the funeral of Queen Liliʻuokalani

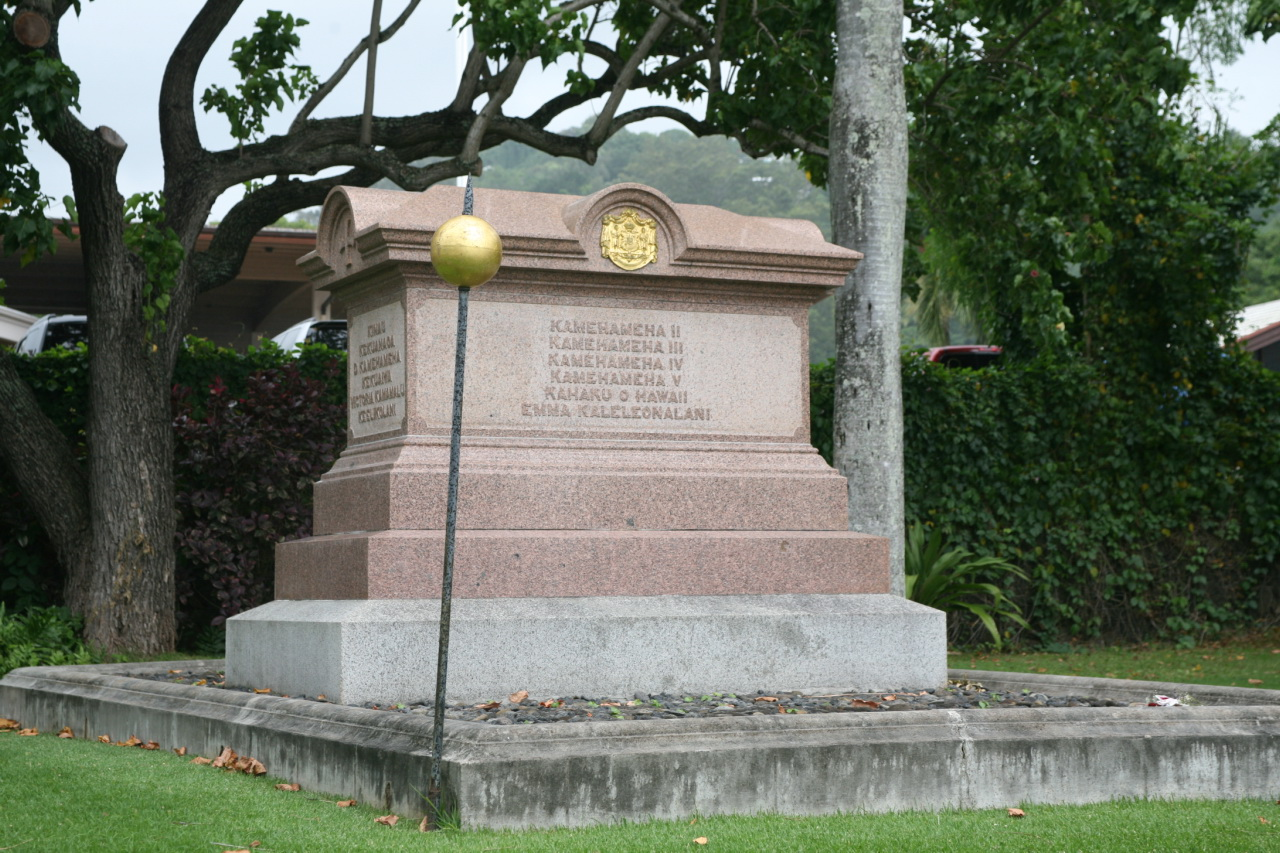
Metal representation of pūloʻuloʻu outside the Kamehameha Tomb at the Royal Mausoleum of Hawaii at Mauna ʻAla

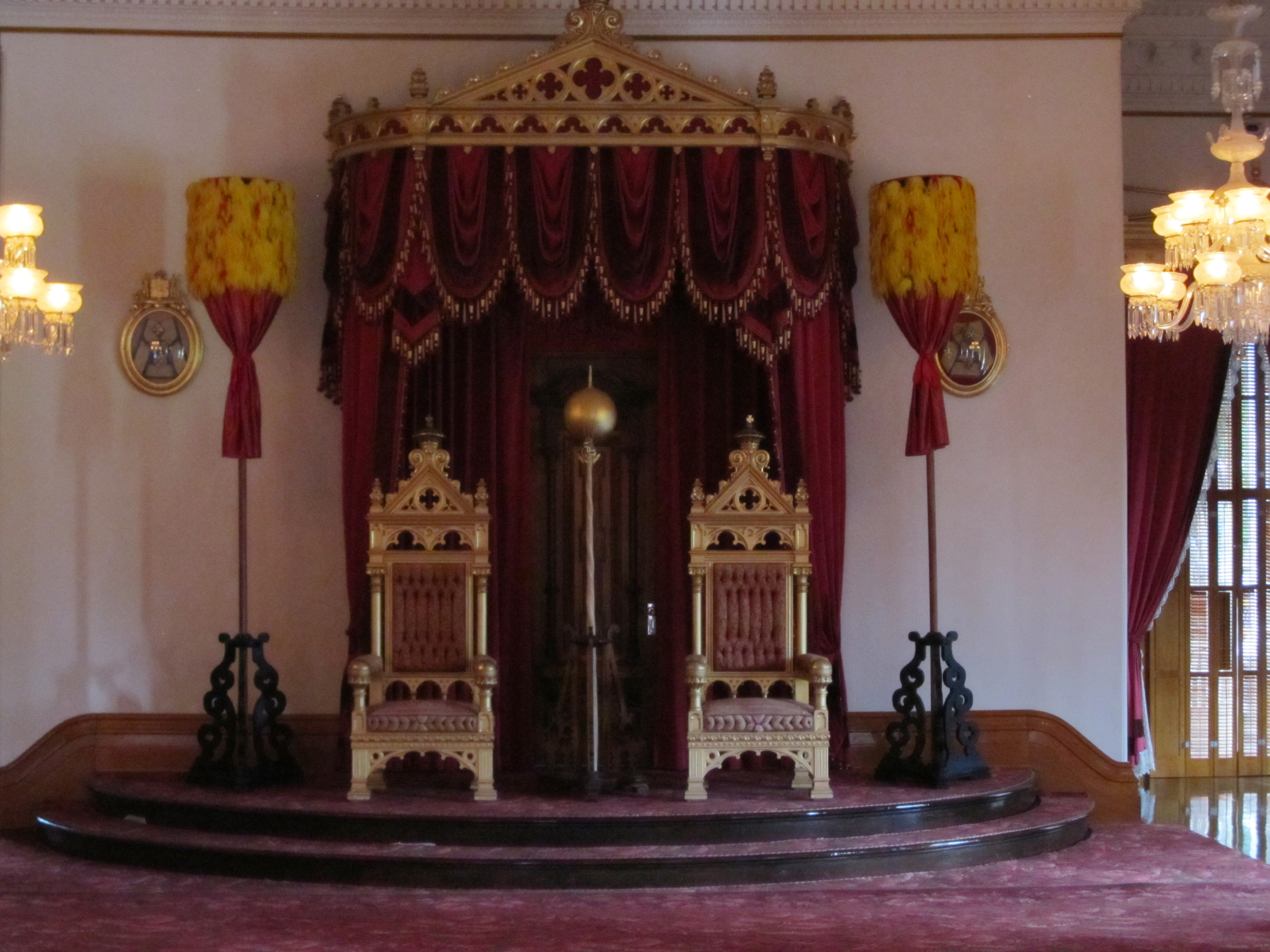
Metal representation of pūloʻuloʻu made with a narwhal tusk at ʻIolani Palace

Coat of arms of Hawaii

Seal of Hawaii

== See also ==
- Kāhili
