= Communist Party of Hawaii =

Communist Party of Hawaii ʻAoʻao Komunista o Hawaiʻi
- Founder: Bill Bailey
- Founded: 1934
- Dissolved: 1958
- Merged into: Democratic Party of Hawaii
- Headquarters: Honolulu, Hawaii
- Ideology: Trade unionism
- National affiliation: Communist Party USA

The Communist Party of Hawaii was the regional party of the Communist Party USA in the United States Territory of Hawaii founded in 1934 by American communist Bill Bailey.

== Appeal ==
The party targeted poor working class such as the stevedores and plantation workers in the Territory.

== Unions ==
The Communist Party was involved with forming labor unions and organizing labor strikes and the general strikes during the nonviolent revolution leading up to the "Revolution of 1954".

== Decline ==
=== Hawaii 7 ===
In an attempt to stop the movement the FBI launched synchronized raids in 1951, rounding up seven prominent members of the party including chairman Charles Fujimoto. The seven detainees became known as the Hawaii 7 and were charged with conspiracy to overthrow the territorial government. Following the raids the party went into hiding. Several members that were members of both the Communist and Democratic parties moved to the Democrats and helped push the Democrats of Hawaii closer to center-left. Little is known about the Communist Party after it went underground, but it was still active in the successful Hawaii Democratic Revolution of 1954.

=== Defunct ===
By far the largest contribution to the decline of Communist Party was their own success. They had gained support from the poor and non-Caucasian workers by messages of bringing an improved lifestyle, equal rights, and expanded opportunities. But as these promises were coming true there was no longer a need for the Party. Most members, including Jack Wayne Hall, head of the ILWU in Hawaii, became convinced the task of the Communist Party was completed and the Party was dissolved in 1958. In February 1959, it was reported that "FBI investigations, plus ... Federal court convictions, had 'crippled' the Communist apparatus in Hawaii[.]" The "anti-American activity" of the Communist Party of Hawaii was opposed by the IMUA organization.
