= Ua Mau ke Ea o ka ʻĀina i ka Pono =

Motto of the state of Hawaii

Seal of the State of Hawaii bearing the motto

Ua Mau ke Ea o ka ʻĀina i ka Pono (Hawaiian pronunciation: [ˈuə ˈmɐw ke ˈɛə o kə ˈʔaːi.nə i kə ˈpo.no]) is a Hawaiian phrase, spoken by Kamehameha III, and adopted in 1959 as the state motto. It is most commonly translated as "the life of the land is perpetuated in righteousness." An alternative translation, which appears at Thomas Square next to a statue of Kamehameha III, is "The sovereignty of the kingdom continues because we are righteous."

== History ==
This phrase was first spoken by Kamehameha III, the King of Hawaii, on July 31, 1843, on Thomas Square, Oʻahu, when the sovereignty of the Kingdom of Hawaii was returned by the British through the restorative actions of Admiral Richard Darton Thomas, following the brief takeover by Lord George Paulet.

Today, the phrase is extensively used by both the state of Hawaii and by Hawaiian sovereignty activists.

== Meaning ==
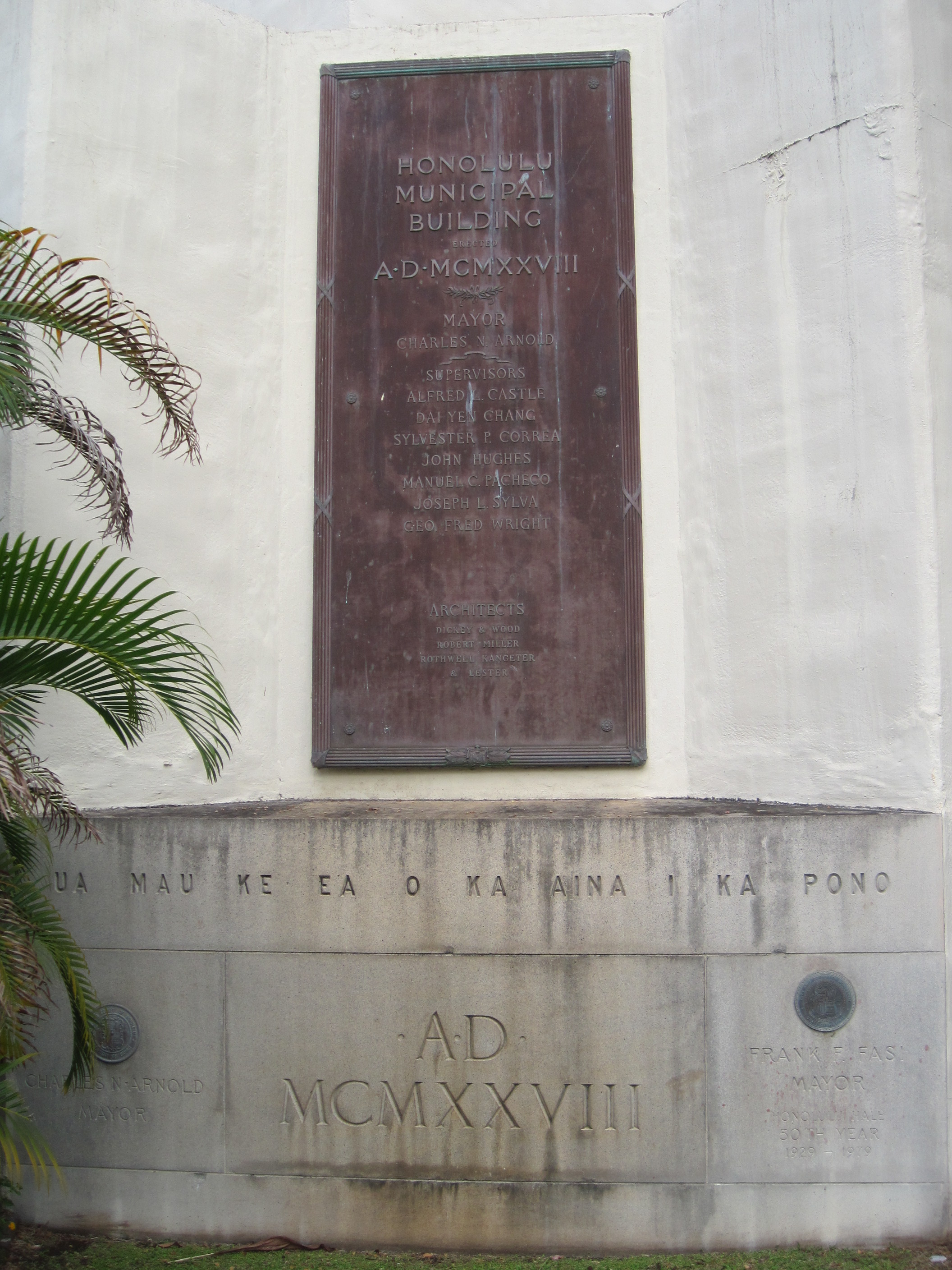
The phrase is engraved on the corner stone of Honolulu Hale, the Honolulu City Hall.

Some of the words in the phrase have additional meanings or connotations. In particular, Ea means not only "life" or "breath" but also "sovereignty". Hawaiian activists argue that ea refers specifically to sovereignty because of the circumstances at the time Kamehameha III uttered it. Thus, an alternate translation is "The sovereignty of the land is perpetuated in righteousness."

Pono, commonly translated as "righteousness", may also connote goodness, fairness, order, or completeness. ʻĀina, translated in the motto as "land", also has a more significant meaning in the Hawaiian language. ʻĀina is better translated as "that which feeds" and can describe a relationship between Native Hawaiians and the islands.
