= Honolulu Record =

Newspaper in Honolulu, Hawaii

- Type: Newspaper
- Founder: Koji Ariyoshi
- Founded: 1948
- Ceased publication: 1958
- City: Honolulu, Hawaii
- OCLC number: 11471299

The Honolulu Record was a newspaper established in 1948 by Koji Ariyoshi, a Hawaiian Nisei labor activist and war veteran with support from the International Longshore and Warehouse Union.

== History ==
A Pro Communist Party newspaper, The Record earned a strong reputation for its muckraking investigative journalism. In 1950, it revealed that a much-praised 14-year professor at the University of Hawaii, Shunzo Sakamaki, had been denied tenure simply because he was Japanese - and that no "local product" had ever been promoted to full professorship. Ariyoshi's dogged four-year campaign eventually resulted in the tenureship of Professor Sakamaki.

The paper ceased publication in 1958.
