= Koji Ariyoshi =

American activist

- Born: 1914; Hawaii, United States
- Died: 1976 (aged 61–62); Hawaii, United States
- Occupations: Labor activist, U.S. Army sergeant
- Known for: Hawaii Seven, Labor Activism, Dixie Mission

Koji Ariyoshi
- Branch: United States Army
- Rank: Sergeant

Koji Ariyoshi (有吉幸治, Ariyoshi Kōji) (1914–1976) was an American labor activist and a Sergeant in the United States Army during the Second World War.

== Early life ==
Ariyoshi was born in Hawaii in 1914 to Japanese immigrant parents. Ariyoshi grew up helping his family make a living on a small eight-acre coffee plantation. He attended Konawaena High School before he worked for six years to help pay off the family debt. Around then, Ariyoshi became interested in labor politics. He attended the University of Hawaiʻi, but became alienated by his perception of institutional bias against labor unions and liberal thought. He transferred to the University of Georgia on scholarship. In Georgia, where he was befriended by the parents of the novelist Erskine Caldwell, Ariyoshi became determined to ease the plight of the sharecroppers he met and to improve labor conditions for the working class.

In 1941, Ariyoshi graduated from the University of Georgia with a Bachelor of Arts in journalism (A.B.J.) from the Henry W. Grady College of Journalism and Mass Communication. After graduation, Ariyoshi traveled to San Francisco, where he befriended Karl Yoneda, a founder of the International Longshore and Warehouse Union. On December 7th, 1941, the Japanese navy attacked Pearl Harbor, Hawaii. Soon afterward, following the signing of Executive Order 9066, Ariyoshi was placed in the Manzanar War Relocation Center, a Japanese American internment camp.

== Second World War ==
Ariyoshi met and married his wife, Taeko Ariyoshi, at Manzanar. He decided to help the war effort by working as a language specialist with the United States Army Military Intelligence. He was soon transferred out of the internment camp and into India, Sri Lanka, and Burma because of his ability to translate Japanese. While stationed in the British Colonies, Ariyoshi witnessed what he believed to be the inequality of the colonial system. He was later transferred to China, where he was exposed to the communists.

=== Dixie Mission ===
While stationed at the Dixie Mission in Yan'an, Ariyoshi met and worked with both Chinese and Japanese Communists, including Mao Zedong and Sanzo Nosaka. His primary duties in Yan'an were to learn more about the Communist efforts to train Japanese prisoners of war, translate Japanese source materials and develop Allied propaganda against the Japanese. In China, Ariyoshi saw the differences between the peasants' meager lifestyle under the Kuomintang and the Chinese Communist Party and left China with an appreciation for what communism or at least progressive socialism could accomplish.

=== Other wartime activities ===
Ariyoshi came into contact with members of the Korean independence movement and the Japanese dissident Kaji Wataru.

== Postwar ==
Ariyoshi returned to Hawaii in 1948 and, inspired by the progressive Japanese-language paper, Hawaii Hochi, began publishing a labor-oriented newspaper, the Honolulu Record.

As editor, Ariyoshi lambasted labor conditions for the working class and addressed what he considered to be other social inequalities in the islands. His socialist views bolstered the growth of the local labor movement and the Democratic Party in Hawaii. However, at the height of the Second Red Scare and McCarthyism, he and six other progressives (including Jack Hall, the head of the Hawaii Longshoremen's Union) were arrested under charges of attempting to overthrow the American government under the Smith Act. The case later became known as the Hawaii Seven. Ariyoshi spent one night in jail, and after his release, he continued to promote his socialist views through his paper. The court found him guilty, but he appealed the ruling and was eventually acquitted of all charges. Madame Sun Yat-sen, the widow of Sun Yat-sen, "the George Washington of China," had donated her mother's wedding dress to be sold to provide funds for Ariyoshi's legal defense.

In 1958, Ariyoshi was forced to close his newspaper for lack of funds. He became a florist, earning himself the nickname, "The Red Florist." In 1969, he was appointed a member of the Hawaii Foundation for History and the Humanities. Ariyoshi was later appointed president of the organization, a position that he held for three years. With the American opening to China, Ariyoshi was one of the first Americans invited to return to that country, even before President Nixon's visit. He wrote a series of articles for the Honolulu Star-Bulletin, and a television documentary on Chinese arts and crafts, which helped to repopularize cloisonne in the country. He was a founder of the Hawaii-China People's Friendship Association to improve relations between China and the United States. He served on the national steering committee of the U.S.-China Friendship Association from its founding in 1974 until his death.

In later life, Ariyoshi began teaching at the University of Hawaiʻi in the Ethnic Studies Department. In 1976 the Hawaii Legislature honored Ariyoshi for his life's work and apologized for the things that had been done to him in the McCarthy era. Koji Ariyoshi died later that year from cancer, and an annual award in his name was established by the U.S.-China Peoples Friendship to honor an outstanding figure in promoting U.S.-China friendship.

== In film ==
On May 5, 2005, he was featured in the Biography Hawaii series airing on PBS Hawaii. The documentary featured original footage of Ariyoshi during his time in Yen'an and explored his persecution during the 1950s.

== See also ==
- Dixie Mission
- Japanese resistance during the Shōwa period
