= Jack Hall (trade unionist) =

American labor organizer (b. 1915, d. 1971)

- Born: Jack Wayne Hall; February 28, 1915; Ashland, Wisconsin, U.S.
- Died: January 2, 1971 (aged 55); San Francisco, California, U.S.
- Occupations: Vice President and Director of Organization, ILWU (1969-1971); Hawaii Regional Director, ILWU (1944-1969)
- Spouse: Yoshiko Hall
- Children: 2
- Website: Jack Hall - ILWU Local 142

Jack Wayne Hall (February 28, 1915 – January 2, 1971) was an American labor organizer and trade unionist. He was the Hawaii Regional Director of the International Longshore and Warehouse Union.

== Early life ==
Hall was born in Ashland, Wisconsin, on February 28, 1915. When he was a child, his mother committed suicide. He was raised in Los Angeles by his grandmother.

After graduating from Huntington Park High School in 1931, Hall became a merchant seaman and sailed aboard the SS President Hoover. His experience traveling in Asia and witnessing poverty and the effects of colonialism led him to become a communist.

== Career ==
Hall's first labor strike was the 1934 West Coast waterfront strike as a member of the Sailors Union of the Pacific.

Hall arrived in Hawaii in 1935, where he wrote for a newspaper called The Voice of Labor. In 1944 he was named Hawaii's first regional director for the ILWU. He then led a drive that organized plantation and dock workers as one interracial union. Before the drive, most strikes were held by one ethnic group at a time, with the exception of the Oahu sugar strike of 1920, during which Japanese and Filipino plantation workers went on strike together. The drive ended with the ILWU having contracts with 33 out of 34 sugar plantations, and 30,000 members. This made the union very successful during strikes in the late 1940s, especially the strike in 1949 that closed Hawaiian ports for six months.

When he could not make changes with labor strikes, Hall worked politically, eventually becoming close with future Governor of Hawaii John Burns. Hall drafted the Hawaii State Employment Relations Act, which was a Hawaiian version of the Wagner Act. It was introduced in the Hawaiian Senate by J. B. Fernandez, and passed in 1945.

In August 1951 Hall and 6 other people (later called the Hawaii 7) were accused by Jack Kawano of violating the Smith Act. They were arrested and investigated by the House Un-American Activities Committee. Many in the ILWU claimed that the arrest was planned by the Big Five to interfere with the union's negotiations with the sugar companies. The Hawaii 7 were convicted on June 19, 1953. Hall was sentenced to 5 years in prison and a $5,000 fine. The charge was later overturned during an appeal to the 9th U.S. Circuit Court of Appeals. Despite this, he remained popular with the workers he unionized, though the union itself lost political influence.

== Later life and death ==
In 1969, Hall was promoted to International Vice President and Director of Organization for the ILWU. He moved to San Francisco, where he died of a stroke on January 2, 1971. After his death, flags were flown at half mast. Members of the ILWU and other unions stopped work for 15 minutes in the first statewide work stoppage in Hawaii's history.

== Legacy ==
January 2nd, the day of Hall’s death, is currently recognized as a paid holiday under many ILWU contracts as “Jack Wayne Hall Day”. Other ILWU contracts recognize February 28th, Hall’s birthday, as a paid holiday by the same name.

The ILWU Jack Wayne Hall Building in Honokaʻa was named in his honor. The building was named to the National Register of Historic Places for the State of Hawaii on October 23, 2018.

In 1979, the ILWU built a 144-unit apartment complex in Waipahu and named it the Jack Hall Memorial Housing Complex in his honor.

A book titled A Spark Is Struck! Jack Hall and the ILWU in Hawaii was written in 1979 by journalist Sanford Zalburg, who covered Hall and the ILWU as a reporter, and later city editor, for The Honolulu Advertiser from 1959 to 1972. The book was initially published by the University of Hawaiʻi Press during its original release in 1979. The book was reissued by Watermark Publishing in 2007.

A documentary titled Jack Hall: His Life and Times, was released on February 28th, 2008. The documentary was produced by the Center for Labor Education and Research at the University of Hawaiʻi at West Oʻahu and aired by PBS Hawai'i. The release date of the documentary was chosen to coincide with Hall’s birthday.

== See also ==
- Kimiko Burton
- Arthur Rutledge
- Hawaii Democratic Revolution of 1954
