= Political party strength in Hawaii =

Politics in the US state of Hawaii

The following table indicates the party of elected officials in the U.S. state of Hawaii:

- Governor
- Lieutenant Governor

The table also indicates the historical party composition in the:

- State Senate
- State House of Representatives
- State delegation to the U.S. Senate
- State delegation to the U.S. House of Representatives

For years in which a presidential election was held, the table indicates which party's nominees received the state's electoral votes.

The parties are as follows:

- Home Rule (HR)
- Democratic (D)
- Independent (Kuoka) (IK)
- Lunalilo (Lu)
- National Liberal (NL)
- National/King's (N)
- National Reform (NR)
- Queen Emma Party (Q)
- Reform/Republican (R)
- Whig (W)
- No Party (NP)

== Kingdom of Hawaii ==
=== 1810–1843 ===
Year	Executive offices		Legislature		State Department
Year	Monarch	Prime Minister	House of Nobles	House of Rep.	Agent
1810	Kamehameha I (NP)	no such office	no such offices	no such offices	no such office
...	Kamehameha I (NP)	no such office	no such offices	no such offices	no such office
1818	Kamehameha I (NP)	no such office	no such offices	no such offices	no such office
1819	Kamehameha I (NP)	Kaʻahumanu (?)	no such offices	no such offices	no such office
1820	Kamehameha II (?)	Kaʻahumanu (?)	no such offices	no such offices	John Coffin Jones Jr. (?)
...	Kamehameha II (?)	Kaʻahumanu (?)	no such offices	no such offices	John Coffin Jones Jr. (?)
1824	Kamehameha II (?)	Kaʻahumanu (?)	no such offices	no such offices	John Coffin Jones Jr. (?)
1825	Kamehameha III (?)	Kaʻahumanu (?)	no such offices	no such offices	John Coffin Jones Jr. (?)
...	Kamehameha III (?)	Kaʻahumanu (?)	no such offices	no such offices	John Coffin Jones Jr. (?)
1832	Kamehameha III (?)	Kaʻahumanu (?)	no such offices	no such offices	John Coffin Jones Jr. (?)
1833	Kamehameha III (?)	Kīnaʻu (?)	no such offices	no such offices	John Coffin Jones Jr. (?)
...	Kamehameha III (?)	Kīnaʻu (?)	no such offices	no such offices	John Coffin Jones Jr. (?)
1838	Kamehameha III (?)	Kīnaʻu (?)	no such offices	no such offices	John Coffin Jones Jr. (?)
1839	Kamehameha III (?)	Kīnaʻu (?)	no such offices	no such offices	Peter A. Brinsmade (?)
1840	Kamehameha III (?)	Kekāuluohi (?)			Peter A. Brinsmade (?)
...	Kamehameha III (?)	Kekāuluohi (?)			Peter A. Brinsmade (?)
1843	Kamehameha III (?)	Kekāuluohi (?)			Peter A. Brinsmade (?)

=== 1843 ===
	Provisional Cession				
Year	Representative	Commissioners	Deputy	Commissioner	Agent
1843	George Paulet (NP)	Duncan F. Mackay (NP) and John E. Frere (NP)	Gerrit P. Judd (?)	George Brown (?)	Peter A. Brinsmade (?)
1843	Richard D. Thomas (NP)	John E. Frere (NP)	Gerrit P. Judd (?)	George Brown (?)	Peter A. Brinsmade (?)

=== 1843–1893 ===
Year	Kingdom						Royal Elections
Year	Monarch	Prime Minister	House of Nobles	House of Rep.	Commissioner	Consul	Royal Elections
1843	Kamehameha III (?)	Kekāuluohi (?)			George Brown (?)	Peter A. Brinsmade (?)	no such office
1844	Kamehameha III (?)	Kekāuluohi (?)			George Brown (?)	Alexander G. Abell (?)	no such office
1845	Kamehameha III (?)	Kekāuluohi (?)			George Brown (?)	Alexander G. Abell (?)	no such office
1846	Kamehameha III (?)	Keoni Ana (?)			Anthony Ten Eyke (?)	Joel Turrill (D)	no such office
1847	Kamehameha III (?)	Keoni Ana (?)			Anthony Ten Eyke (?)	Joel Turrill (D)	no such office
1848	Kamehameha III (?)	Keoni Ana (?)			Anthony Ten Eyke (?)	Joel Turrill (D)	no such office
1849	Kamehameha III (?)	Keoni Ana (?)			Charles Eames (?)	Joel Turrill (D)	no such office
1850	Kamehameha III (?)	Keoni Ana (?)			Luther Severance (W)	Elisha H. Allen (W)	no such office
1851	Kamehameha III (?)	Keoni Ana (?)			Luther Severance (W)	Elisha H. Allen (W)	no such office
1852	Kamehameha III (?)	Keoni Ana (?)			Luther Severance (W)	Elisha H. Allen (W)	no such office
1853	Kamehameha III (?)	Keoni Ana (?)			David L. Gregg (D–IL)	Benjamin F. Angel (D)	no such office
1854	Kamehameha III (?)	Keoni Ana (?)			David L. Gregg (D–IL)	Darius A. Ogden (D-NY)	no such office
1855	Kamehameha IV (?)	Keoni Ana (?)			David L. Gregg (D–IL)	Darius A. Ogden (D-NY)	no such office
1856	Kamehameha IV (?)	Victoria Kamāmalu (?)			David L. Gregg (D–IL)	Darius A. Ogden (D-NY)	no such office
1857	Kamehameha IV (?)	Victoria Kamāmalu (?)			David L. Gregg (D–IL)	Abner Pratt (?)	no such office
1858	Kamehameha IV (?)	Victoria Kamāmalu (?)			James W. Borden (D–IN)	Abner Pratt (?)	no such office
1859	Kamehameha IV (?)	Victoria Kamāmalu (?)			James W. Borden (D–IN)	Abner Pratt (?)	no such office
1860	Kamehameha IV (?)	Victoria Kamāmalu (?)			James W. Borden (D–IN)	no such office	no such office
1861	Kamehameha IV (?)	Victoria Kamāmalu (?)			Thomas J. Dryer (W)	no such office	no such office
1862	Kamehameha IV (?)	Victoria Kamāmalu (?)			Thomas J. Dryer (W)	no such office	no such office
1863	Kamehameha IV (?)	Victoria Kamāmalu (?)			James McBride (R-OR)	no such office	no such office
1864	Kamehameha V (?)	Kekūanaōʻa (?)			James McBride (R-OR)	no such office	no such office
1865	Kamehameha V (?)	no such office			James McBride (R-OR)	no such office	no such office
1866	Kamehameha V (?)	no such office			Edward M. McCook (R-CO)	no such office	no such office
1867	Kamehameha V (?)	no such office			Edward M. McCook (R-CO)	no such office	no such office
1868	Kamehameha V (?)	no such office			Edward M. McCook (R-CO)	no such office	no such office
1869	Kamehameha V (?)	no such office			Henry A. Peirce (?)	no such office	no such office
1870	Kamehameha V (?)	no such office			Henry A. Peirce (?)	no such office	no such office
1871	Kamehameha V (?)	no such office			Henry A. Peirce (?)	no such office	no such office
1872	Kamehameha V (?)	no such office			Henry A. Peirce (?)	no such office	no such office
1873	Lunalilo (Lu)	no such office			Henry A. Peirce (?)	no such office	Lunalilo (Lu), Kalaimamahu Dynasty
1874	Lunalilo (Lu)	no such office			Henry A. Peirce (?)	no such office	Kalākaua (N), Kalākaua Dynasty
1875	Kalākaua (N)	no such office	[?]		Henry A. Peirce (?)	no such office	Kalākaua (N), Kalākaua Dynasty
1876	Kalākaua (N)	no such office	[?]		Henry A. Peirce (?)	no such office	Kalākaua (N), Kalākaua Dynasty
1877	Kalākaua (N)	no such office	?N, 2Q, ?R, ?NP [?]		James M. Comly (R)	no such office	Kalākaua (N), Kalākaua Dynasty
1878	Kalākaua (N)	no such office	?N, 2Q, ?R, ?NP [?]		James M. Comly (R)	no such office	Kalākaua (N), Kalākaua Dynasty
1879	Kalākaua (N)	no such office	[?]		James M. Comly (R)	no such office	Kalākaua (N), Kalākaua Dynasty
1880	Kalākaua (N)	no such office	[?]		James M. Comly (R)	no such office	Kalākaua (N), Kalākaua Dynasty
1881	Kalākaua (N)	no such office	?N, ?Q, ?R, ?NP [?]		James M. Comly (R)	no such office	Kalākaua (N), Kalākaua Dynasty
1882	Kalākaua (N)	Walter M. Gibson (N)	?N, ?Q, ?R, ?NP [?]		Rollin M. Daggett (R)	no such office	Kalākaua (N), Kalākaua Dynasty
1883	Kalākaua (N)	Walter M. Gibson (N)	?N, 3Q, ?R, ?NP [?]		Rollin M. Daggett (R)	no such office	Kalākaua (N), Kalākaua Dynasty
1884	Kalākaua (N)	Walter M. Gibson (N)	?N, 3Q, ?R, ?NP [?]		Rollin M. Daggett (R)	no such office	Kalākaua (N), Kalākaua Dynasty
1885	Kalākaua (N)	Walter M. Gibson (N)	15N, 13IK (Note: The House of Nobles and House of Representatives were merged into a 28-member body in 1864.)		George W. Merrill (?)	no such office	Kalākaua (N), Kalākaua Dynasty
1886	Kalākaua (N)	Walter M. Gibson (N)	15N, 13IK		George W. Merrill (?)	no such office	Kalākaua (N), Kalākaua Dynasty
1887	Kalākaua (N)	no such office	18N, 10IK		George W. Merrill (?)	no such office	Kalākaua (N), Kalākaua Dynasty
1888	Kalākaua (N)	no such office	[?]	[?]	George W. Merrill (?)	no such office	Kalākaua (N), Kalākaua Dynasty
1889	Kalākaua (N)	no such office	[?]	[?]	John L. Stevens (R)	no such office	Kalākaua (N), Kalākaua Dynasty
1890	Kalākaua (N)	no such office	[?]	[?]	John L. Stevens (R)	no such office	Kalākaua (N), Kalākaua Dynasty
1891	Kalākaua (N)	no such office	13R, 9NR, 2IK	14NR, 10R	John L. Stevens (R)	no such office	Kalākaua (N), Kalākaua Dynasty
1892	Liliʻuokalani (NP, NR cabinet)	no such office	13R, 9NR, 2IK	14NR, 10R	John L. Stevens (R)	no such office	Kalākaua (N), Kalākaua Dynasty
1893	Liliʻuokalani (NP, NR cabinet)	no such office	14R, 3NR, 2NL	12NL, 9R, 5NR, 3IK	John L. Stevens (R)	no such office	Kalākaua (N), Kalākaua Dynasty

== Republic of Hawaii ==
	President	Vice President (Note: The office of Vice-President was not carried over into the Republic of Hawaii. In case of the president's inability to govern (absence, death, or incapacitation) the Minister of Foreign Affairs would have become acting president. Previously, this would be the case if both the President and Vice-president were unable to govern.)	Senate	House of Rep.
1893	Sanford B. Dole (R)	William Chauncey Wilder (R)	no such bodies	
1894	Sanford B. Dole (R)	no such office	15R	15R
1895	Sanford B. Dole (R)	no such office	15R	15R
1896	Sanford B. Dole (R)	no such office	15R	15R
1897	Sanford B. Dole (R)	no such office	15R	15R
1898	Sanford B. Dole (R)	no such office	15R	15R

== Territory of Hawaii ==
Year	Executive offices				Territorial Legislature		Territorial delegate
Year	Governor	Sec. of Terr.	Attorney General	Treasurer	Senate	House of Rep.	Territorial delegate
1898	Sanford B. Dole (R) (Note: Territorial governor appointed by the President of the United States.) (Note: Resigned to take seat on the United States District Court for Hawaii Territory.)	no such offices					no such office
1899	Sanford B. Dole (R)	Ernest A. Mott-Smith	Henry E. Cooper	Henry E. Cooper			no such office
1900	Sanford B. Dole (R)	Henry E. Cooper	Edmund Pearson Dole	Theodore F. Lansing	9HR, 6R	17HR, 9R, 4D	Robert William Wilcox (HR)
1901	Sanford B. Dole (R)	Henry E. Cooper	Edmund Pearson Dole	William H. Wright	9HR, 6R	17HR, 9R, 4D	Robert William Wilcox (HR)
1902	Sanford B. Dole (R)	Henry E. Cooper	Edmund Pearson Dole	William H. Wright	9HR, 6R	17HR, 9R, 4D	Robert William Wilcox (HR)
1903	Sanford B. Dole (R)	George R. Carter (R)	Edmund Pearson Dole	A. N. Kepoikai	10R, 4HR, 1D	20R, 10HR	Jonah Kūhiō Kalanianaʻole (R)
1904	George R. Carter (R) (Note: Resigned; term was to have ended November 23, 1907.)	A. L. C. Atkinson	Lorrin Andrews	A. J. Campbell	10R, 4HR, 1D	20R, 10HR	Jonah Kūhiō Kalanianaʻole (R)
1905	George R. Carter (R)	A. L. C. Atkinson	Lorrin Andrews	A. J. Campbell	14R, 1D	28R, 1D, 1HR	Jonah Kūhiō Kalanianaʻole (R)
1906	George R. Carter (R)	A. L. C. Atkinson	Emil C. Peters	A. J. Campbell	14R, 1D	28R, 1D, 1HR	Jonah Kūhiō Kalanianaʻole (R)
1907	George R. Carter (R)	A. L. C. Atkinson	Emil C. Peters	A. J. Campbell	12R, 2D, 1HR	24R, 6HR	Jonah Kūhiō Kalanianaʻole (R)
1908	Walter F. Frear (R)	Ernest A. Mott-Smith	Charles R. Hemenway	A. J. Campbell	12R, 2D, 1HR	24R, 6HR	Jonah Kūhiō Kalanianaʻole (R)
1909	Walter F. Frear (R)	Ernest A. Mott-Smith	Charles R. Hemenway	Charles Reed Hemenway	9R, 4D, 2HR	22R, 7D, 1HR	Jonah Kūhiō Kalanianaʻole (R)
1910	Walter F. Frear (R)	Ernest A. Mott-Smith	Charles R. Hemenway	D. L. Conkling	9R, 4D, 2HR	22R, 7D, 1HR	Jonah Kūhiō Kalanianaʻole (R)
1911	Walter F. Frear (R)	Ernest A. Mott-Smith	Alexander Lindsay Jr.	D. L. Conkling	12R, 2HR, 1D	28R, 2HR	Jonah Kūhiō Kalanianaʻole (R)
1912	Walter F. Frear (R)	Ernest A. Mott-Smith	Alexander Lindsay Jr.	D. L. Conkling	12R, 2HR, 1D	28R, 2HR	Jonah Kūhiō Kalanianaʻole (R)
1913	Walter F. Frear (R)	Ernest A. Mott-Smith	Alexander Lindsay Jr.	D. L. Conkling			Jonah Kūhiō Kalanianaʻole (R)
1913	Walter F. Frear (R)	Ernest A. Mott-Smith	Alexander Lindsay Jr.	D. L. Conkling	18R, 15D, 2HR	18R, 11D, 1HR	Jonah Kūhiō Kalanianaʻole (R)
1914	Lucius E. Pinkham (D)	Wade Warren Thayer	Wade Warren Thayer	D. L. Conkling	18R, 15D, 2HR	18R, 11D, 1HR	Jonah Kūhiō Kalanianaʻole (R)
1915	Lucius E. Pinkham (D)	Wade Warren Thayer	Ingram Stainback (D)	Charles J. McCarthy (D)	8R, 7D	29R, 1D	Jonah Kūhiō Kalanianaʻole (R)
1916	Lucius E. Pinkham (D)	Wade Warren Thayer	Ingram Stainback (D)	Charles J. McCarthy (D)	8R, 7D	29R, 1D	Jonah Kūhiō Kalanianaʻole (R)
1917	Lucius E. Pinkham (D)	Wade Warren Thayer	Ingram Stainback (D)	Charles J. McCarthy (D)	12R, 3D	24R, 6D	Jonah Kūhiō Kalanianaʻole (R)
1918	Lucius E. Pinkham (D)	Curtis P. Iaukea	Ingram Stainback (D)	Charles J. McCarthy (D)	12R, 3D	24R, 6D	Jonah Kūhiō Kalanianaʻole (R)
1918	Charles J. McCarthy (D)	Curtis P. Iaukea	Arthur G. Smith	Delbert E. Metzger	12R, 3D	24R, 6D	Jonah Kūhiō Kalanianaʻole (R)
1919	Charles J. McCarthy (D)	Curtis P. Iaukea	Harry Irwin	Delbert E. Metzger	14R, 1D	24R, 6D	Jonah Kūhiō Kalanianaʻole (R)
1920	Charles J. McCarthy (D)	Curtis P. Iaukea	Harry Irwin	Delbert E. Metzger	14R, 1D	24R, 6D	Jonah Kūhiō Kalanianaʻole (R)
1921	Charles J. McCarthy (D)	Curtis P. Iaukea	Harry Irwin	Delbert E. Metzger	[?]	26R, 4D	Jonah Kūhiō Kalanianaʻole (R)
1922	Wallace Rider Farrington (R)	Raymond C. Brown	Harry Irwin	A. Lewis Jr.	[?]	26R, 4D	Henry Alexander Baldwin (R)
1923	Wallace Rider Farrington (R)	Raymond C. Brown	John A. Matthewman	Henry C. Hapai	15R, 0D	29R, 1D	William Paul Jarrett (D)
1924	Wallace Rider Farrington (R)	Raymond C. Brown	John A. Matthewman	Henry C. Hapai	15R, 0D	29R, 1D	William Paul Jarrett (D)
1925	Wallace Rider Farrington (R)	Raymond C. Brown	John A. Matthewman	Henry C. Hapai	[?]	27R, 3D	William Paul Jarrett (D)
1926	Wallace Rider Farrington (R)	Raymond C. Brown	William B. Lymer	Henry C. Hapai	[?]	27R, 3D	William Paul Jarrett (D)
1927	Wallace Rider Farrington (R)	Raymond C. Brown	William B. Lymer	Henry C. Hapai	13R, 2D	28R, 2D	Victor S. K. Houston (R)
1928	Wallace Rider Farrington (R)	Raymond C. Brown	Harry P. Hewitt	Henry C. Hapai	13R, 2D	28R, 2D	Victor S. K. Houston (R)
1929	Wallace Rider Farrington (R)	Raymond C. Brown	Harry P. Hewitt	Henry C. Hapai	14R, 1D	27R, 3D	Victor S. K. Houston (R)
1930	Lawrence M. Judd (R)	Raymond C. Brown	Harry P. Hewitt	E. S. Smith	14R, 1D	27R, 3D	Victor S. K. Houston (R)
1931	Lawrence M. Judd (R)	Raymond C. Brown	Harry P. Hewitt	E. S. Smith	14R, 1D	28R, 2D	Victor S. K. Houston (R)
1932	Lawrence M. Judd (R)	Raymond C. Brown	Harry P. Hewitt	E. S. Smith	14R, 1D	28R, 2D	Victor S. K. Houston (R)
1933	Lawrence M. Judd (R)	Raymond C. Brown	Harry P. Hewitt	E. S. Smith	11R, 4D	20R, 10D	Lincoln L. McCandless (D)
1934	Lawrence M. Judd (R)	Raymond C. Brown	Harry P. Hewitt	E. S. Smith	11R, 4D	20R, 10D	Lincoln L. McCandless (D)
1934	Joseph Poindexter (D) (Note: Remained in office for several months after his term expired until his successor was confirmed.)	Arthur A. Greene	William B. Pittman	William C. McGonagle	11R, 4D	20R, 10D	Lincoln L. McCandless (D)
1935	Joseph Poindexter (D)	Arthur A. Greene	William B. Pittman	William C. McGonagle	10R, 5D	23R, 7D	Samuel Wilder King (R)
1936	Joseph Poindexter (D)	Charles Maner Hite	William B. Pittman	William C. McGonagle	10R, 5D	23R, 7D	Samuel Wilder King (R)
1937	Joseph Poindexter (D)	Charles Maner Hite	Samuel B. Kemp	William C. McGonagle	10R, 4D, 1I	26R, 4D	Samuel Wilder King (R)
1938	Joseph Poindexter (D)	Charles Maner Hite	Samuel B. Kemp	William C. McGonagle	10R, 4D, 1I	26R, 4D	Samuel Wilder King (R)
1939	Joseph Poindexter (D)	Charles Maner Hite	Joseph V. Hodgson	William C. McGonagle	12R, 3D	27R, 3D	Samuel Wilder King (R)
1940	Joseph Poindexter (D)	Charles Maner Hite	Joseph V. Hodgson	Norman D. Godbold Jr.	12R, 3D	27R, 3D	Samuel Wilder King (R)
1941	Joseph Poindexter (D)	Charles Maner Hite	Joseph V. Hodgson	Norman D. Godbold Jr.	12R, 3D	27R, 3D	Samuel Wilder King (R)
1942	Joseph Poindexter (D)	Charles Maner Hite	Ernest K. Kai	Norman D. Godbold Jr.	12R, 3D	27R, 3D	Samuel Wilder King (R)
1942	Ingram Stainback (D) (Note: Had little power until October 24, 1944, as his predecessor, Joseph Poindexter, had declared martial law on December 7, 1941, following the attack on Pearl Harbor, delegating executive authority to the military. During the period of military rule, the territory was governed by Lieutenant Generals Walter Short, Delos Emmons, and Robert C. Richardson, Jr.)	Ernest K. Kai	J. Garner Anthony	Norman D. Godbold Jr.	12R, 3D	27R, 3D	Samuel Wilder King (R)
1943	Ingram Stainback (D)	Ernest K. Kai	J. Garner Anthony	Walter D. Ackerman Jr.	11R, 4D	25R, 5D	Joseph R. Farrington (R)
1944	Ingram Stainback (D)	Gerald R. Corbett	Cyrus Nils Tavares	Walter D. Ackerman Jr.	11R, 4D	25R, 5D	Joseph R. Farrington (R)
1945	Ingram Stainback (D)	Gerald R. Corbett	Cyrus Nils Tavares	Walter D. Ackerman Jr.	8R, 7D	21R, 9D	Joseph R. Farrington (R)
1946	Ingram Stainback (D)	Oren E. Long (D)	Rhoda V. Lewis	Walter D. Ackerman Jr.	8R, 7D	21R, 9D	Joseph R. Farrington (R)
1947	Ingram Stainback (D)	Oren E. Long (D)	Walter D. Ackerman Jr.	Howard H. Adams	8R, 7D	15R, 15D (Note: The House elected a Republican speaker, who broke ties.)	Joseph R. Farrington (R)
1948	Ingram Stainback (D)	Oren E. Long (D)	Walter D. Ackerman Jr.	William B. Brown	8R, 7D	15R, 15D	Joseph R. Farrington (R)
1949	Ingram Stainback (D)	Oren E. Long (D)	Walter D. Ackerman Jr.	William B. Brown	9R, 6D	20R, 10D	Joseph R. Farrington (R)
1950	Ingram Stainback (D)	Oren E. Long (D)	Walter D. Ackerman Jr.	William B. Brown	9R, 6D	20R, 10D	Joseph R. Farrington (R)
1951	Ingram Stainback (D)	Oren E. Long (D)	Walter D. Ackerman Jr.	William B. Brown	9R, 6D	21R, 9D	Joseph R. Farrington (R)
1951	Oren E. Long (D)	Frank G. Serrao	Walter D. Ackerman Jr.	Howard H. Adams	9R, 6D	21R, 9D	Joseph R. Farrington (R)
1952	Oren E. Long (D)	Frank G. Serrao	Walter D. Ackerman Jr.	Sakae Takahashi	9R, 6D	21R, 9D	Joseph R. Farrington (R)
1953	Oren E. Long (D)	Frank G. Serrao	Michiro Watanabe	Kam Tai Lee	8R, 7D	19R, 11D	Joseph R. Farrington (R)
1953	Samuel Wilder King (R) (Note: Resigned immediately when denied a second term by Eisenhower.)	Farrant L. Turner	Edward N. Sylva	Kam Tai Lee	8R, 7D	19R, 11D	Joseph R. Farrington (R)
1954	Samuel Wilder King (R)	Farrant L. Turner	Edward N. Sylva	Kam Tai Lee	8R, 7D	19R, 11D	Elizabeth P. Farrington (R)
1955	Samuel Wilder King (R)	Farrant L. Turner	Edward N. Sylva	Kam Tai Lee	9D, 6R	22D, 8R	Elizabeth P. Farrington (R)
1956	Samuel Wilder King (R)	Farrant L. Turner	Richard K. Sharpless	Kam Tai Lee	9D, 6R	22D, 8R	Elizabeth P. Farrington (R)
1957	Samuel Wilder King (R)	Farrant L. Turner	Shiro Kashiwa	Kam Tai Lee	12D, 3R	18D, 12R	John A. Burns (D)
1957	William F. Quinn (R)	Farrant L. Turner	Herbert Choy	Kam Tai Lee	12D, 3R	18D, 12R	John A. Burns (D)
1958	William F. Quinn (R)	Farrant L. Turner	Herbert Choy	Kam Tai Lee	12D, 3R	18D, 12R	John A. Burns (D)
1959	William F. Quinn (R)	Edward E. Johnston	Jack Mizuha	Raymond Y. C. Ho	16D, 9R	33D, 18R	John A. Burns (D)

== State of Hawaii ==
Year	Executive Offices		State Legislature		U.S. Congress				Electoral votes
Year	Governor	Lieutenant Governor	State Senate	State House	U.S. Senator (Class I)	U.S. Senator (Class III)	U.S. House District 1	U.S. House District 2	Electoral votes
1959	William F. Quinn (R)	James Kealoha (R)	14R, 11D	33D, 18R	Hiram Fong (R)	Oren E. Long (D)	Daniel Inouye (D) (Note: Elected at-large on a general ticket.)		
1960	William F. Quinn (R)	James Kealoha (R)	14R, 11D	33D, 18R	Hiram Fong (R)	Oren E. Long (D)	Daniel Inouye (D)		John F. Kennedy/ Lyndon B. Johnson (D) ✓
1961	William F. Quinn (R)	James Kealoha (R)	14R, 11D	33D, 18R	Hiram Fong (R)	Oren E. Long (D)	Daniel Inouye (D)		John F. Kennedy/ Lyndon B. Johnson (D) ✓
1962	William F. Quinn (R)	James Kealoha (R)	14R, 11D	33D, 18R	Hiram Fong (R)	Oren E. Long (D)	Daniel Inouye (D)		John F. Kennedy/ Lyndon B. Johnson (D) ✓
1963	John A. Burns (D)	William S. Richardson (D)	15D, 10R	40D, 11R	Hiram Fong (R)	Daniel Inouye (D) (Note: Died in office.)	Thomas Gill (D)	Spark Matsunaga (D) (Note: Elected at-large on a general ticket until districts were implemented beginning with the 1970 elections.)	John F. Kennedy/ Lyndon B. Johnson (D) ✓
1964	John A. Burns (D)	William S. Richardson (D)	15D, 10R	40D, 11R	Hiram Fong (R)	Daniel Inouye (D)	Thomas Gill (D)	Spark Matsunaga (D)	Lyndon B. Johnson/ Hubert Humphrey (D) ✓
1965	John A. Burns (D)	William S. Richardson (D)	16D, 9R	39D, 12R	Hiram Fong (R)	Daniel Inouye (D)	Patsy Mink (D)	Spark Matsunaga (D)	Lyndon B. Johnson/ Hubert Humphrey (D) ✓
1966	John A. Burns (D)	William S. Richardson (D)	16D, 9R	39D, 12R	Hiram Fong (R)	Daniel Inouye (D)	Patsy Mink (D)	Spark Matsunaga (D)	Lyndon B. Johnson/ Hubert Humphrey (D) ✓
1967	John A. Burns (D)	Thomas Gill (D)	15D, 10R	39D, 12R	Hiram Fong (R)	Daniel Inouye (D)	Patsy Mink (D)	Spark Matsunaga (D)	Lyndon B. Johnson/ Hubert Humphrey (D) ✓
1968	John A. Burns (D)	Thomas Gill (D)	15D, 10R	39D, 12R	Hiram Fong (R)	Daniel Inouye (D)	Patsy Mink (D)	Spark Matsunaga (D)	Hubert Humphrey/ Edmund Muskie (D) ✗
1969	John A. Burns (D)	Thomas Gill (D)	15D, 10R	38D, 13R	Hiram Fong (R)	Daniel Inouye (D)	Patsy Mink (D)	Spark Matsunaga (D)	Hubert Humphrey/ Edmund Muskie (D) ✗
1970	John A. Burns (D)	Thomas Gill (D)	15D, 10R	38D, 13R	Hiram Fong (R)	Daniel Inouye (D)	Patsy Mink (D)	Spark Matsunaga (D)	Hubert Humphrey/ Edmund Muskie (D) ✗
1971	John A. Burns (D)	George Ariyoshi (D)	17D, 8R	34D, 17R	Hiram Fong (R)	Daniel Inouye (D)	Patsy Mink (D)	Spark Matsunaga (D)	Hubert Humphrey/ Edmund Muskie (D) ✗
1972	John A. Burns (D)	George Ariyoshi (D)	17D, 8R	34D, 17R	Hiram Fong (R)	Daniel Inouye (D)	Patsy Mink (D)	Spark Matsunaga (D)	Richard Nixon/ Spiro Agnew (R) ✓
1973	John A. Burns (D)	George Ariyoshi (D)	17D, 8R	35D, 16R	Hiram Fong (R)	Daniel Inouye (D)	Patsy Mink (D)	Spark Matsunaga (D)	Richard Nixon/ Spiro Agnew (R) ✓
1974	John A. Burns (D)	George Ariyoshi (D)	17D, 8R	35D, 16R	Hiram Fong (R)	Daniel Inouye (D)	Patsy Mink (D)	Spark Matsunaga (D)	Richard Nixon/ Spiro Agnew (R) ✓
1975	George Ariyoshi (D)	Nelson Doi (D)	17D, 8R	34D, 17R	Hiram Fong (R)	Daniel Inouye (D)	Patsy Mink (D)	Spark Matsunaga (D)	Richard Nixon/ Spiro Agnew (R) ✓
1976	George Ariyoshi (D)	Nelson Doi (D)	17D, 8R	34D, 17R	Hiram Fong (R)	Daniel Inouye (D)	Patsy Mink (D)	Spark Matsunaga (D)	Jimmy Carter/ Walter Mondale (D) ✓
1977	George Ariyoshi (D)	Nelson Doi (D)	17D, 8R	41D, 10R	Spark Matsunaga (D)	Daniel Inouye (D)	Cecil Heftel (D) (Note: Resigned to run for Governor.)	Daniel Akaka (D)	Jimmy Carter/ Walter Mondale (D) ✓
1978	George Ariyoshi (D)	Nelson Doi (D)	17D, 8R	41D, 10R	Spark Matsunaga (D)	Daniel Inouye (D)	Cecil Heftel (D)	Daniel Akaka (D)	Jimmy Carter/ Walter Mondale (D) ✓
1979	George Ariyoshi (D)	Jean King (D)	18D, 7R	42D, 9R	Spark Matsunaga (D)	Daniel Inouye (D)	Cecil Heftel (D)	Daniel Akaka (D)	Jimmy Carter/ Walter Mondale (D) ✓
1980	George Ariyoshi (D)	Jean King (D)	18D, 7R	42D, 9R	Spark Matsunaga (D)	Daniel Inouye (D)	Cecil Heftel (D)	Daniel Akaka (D)	Jimmy Carter/ Walter Mondale (D) ✗
1981	George Ariyoshi (D)	Jean King (D)	17D, 8R	39D, 12R	Spark Matsunaga (D)	Daniel Inouye (D)	Cecil Heftel (D)	Daniel Akaka (D)	Jimmy Carter/ Walter Mondale (D) ✗
1982	George Ariyoshi (D)	Jean King (D)	17D, 8R	39D, 12R	Spark Matsunaga (D)	Daniel Inouye (D)	Cecil Heftel (D)	Daniel Akaka (D)	Jimmy Carter/ Walter Mondale (D) ✗
1983	George Ariyoshi (D)	John D. Waiheʻe III (D)	17D, 8R	43D, 8R	Spark Matsunaga (D)	Daniel Inouye (D)	Cecil Heftel (D)	Daniel Akaka (D)	Jimmy Carter/ Walter Mondale (D) ✗
1984	George Ariyoshi (D)	John D. Waiheʻe III (D)	17D, 8R	43D, 8R	Spark Matsunaga (D)	Daniel Inouye (D)	Cecil Heftel (D)	Daniel Akaka (D)	Ronald Reagan/ George H. W. Bush (R) ✓
1985	George Ariyoshi (D)	John D. Waiheʻe III (D)	22D, 3R	40D, 11R	Spark Matsunaga (D)	Daniel Inouye (D)	Cecil Heftel (D)	Daniel Akaka (D)	Ronald Reagan/ George H. W. Bush (R) ✓
1986	George Ariyoshi (D)	John D. Waiheʻe III (D)	22D, 3R	40D, 11R	Spark Matsunaga (D)	Daniel Inouye (D)	Cecil Heftel (D)	Daniel Akaka (D)	Ronald Reagan/ George H. W. Bush (R) ✓
1986	George Ariyoshi (D)	John D. Waiheʻe III (D)	22D, 3R	40D, 11R	Spark Matsunaga (D)	Daniel Inouye (D)	vacant	Daniel Akaka (D)	Ronald Reagan/ George H. W. Bush (R) ✓
1986	George Ariyoshi (D)	John D. Waiheʻe III (D)	22D, 3R	40D, 11R	Spark Matsunaga (D)	Daniel Inouye (D)	Neil Abercrombie (D) (Note: Elected in special election to complete term of Heftel, who resigned to run for governor.)	Daniel Akaka (D)	Ronald Reagan/ George H. W. Bush (R) ✓
1987	John D. Waiheʻe III (D)	Ben Cayetano (D)	20D, 5R	40D, 11R	Spark Matsunaga (D)	Daniel Inouye (D)	Pat Saiki (R)	Daniel Akaka (D)	Ronald Reagan/ George H. W. Bush (R) ✓
1988	John D. Waiheʻe III (D)	Ben Cayetano (D)	20D, 5R	40D, 11R	Spark Matsunaga (D)	Daniel Inouye (D)	Pat Saiki (R)	Daniel Akaka (D)	Michael Dukakis/ Lloyd Bentsen (D) ✗
1989	John D. Waiheʻe III (D)	Ben Cayetano (D)	22D, 3R	45D, 6R	Spark Matsunaga (D)	Daniel Inouye (D)	Pat Saiki (R)	Daniel Akaka (D)	Michael Dukakis/ Lloyd Bentsen (D) ✗
1990	John D. Waiheʻe III (D)	Ben Cayetano (D)	22D, 3R	45D, 6R	Spark Matsunaga (D)	Daniel Inouye (D)	Pat Saiki (R)	Daniel Akaka (D)	Michael Dukakis/ Lloyd Bentsen (D) ✗
1990	John D. Waiheʻe III (D)	Ben Cayetano (D)	22D, 3R	45D, 6R	Daniel Akaka (D)	Daniel Inouye (D)	Pat Saiki (R)	vacant	Michael Dukakis/ Lloyd Bentsen (D) ✗
1991	John D. Waiheʻe III (D)	Ben Cayetano (D)	22D, 3R	45D, 6R	Daniel Akaka (D)	Daniel Inouye (D)	Neil Abercrombie (D) (Note: Resigned to run for Governor.)	Patsy Mink (D)	Michael Dukakis/ Lloyd Bentsen (D) ✗
1992	John D. Waiheʻe III (D)	Ben Cayetano (D)	22D, 3R	45D, 6R	Daniel Akaka (D)	Daniel Inouye (D)	Neil Abercrombie (D)	Patsy Mink (D)	Bill Clinton/ Al Gore (D) ✓
1993	John D. Waiheʻe III (D)	Ben Cayetano (D)	22D, 3R	47D, 4R	Daniel Akaka (D)	Daniel Inouye (D)	Neil Abercrombie (D)	Patsy Mink (D)	Bill Clinton/ Al Gore (D) ✓
1994	John D. Waiheʻe III (D)	Ben Cayetano (D)	22D, 3R	47D, 4R	Daniel Akaka (D)	Daniel Inouye (D)	Neil Abercrombie (D)	Patsy Mink (D)	Bill Clinton/ Al Gore (D) ✓
1995	Ben Cayetano (D)	Mazie Hirono (D)	23D, 2R	44D, 7R	Daniel Akaka (D)	Daniel Inouye (D)	Neil Abercrombie (D)	Patsy Mink (D)	Bill Clinton/ Al Gore (D) ✓
1996	Ben Cayetano (D)	Mazie Hirono (D)	23D, 2R	44D, 7R	Daniel Akaka (D)	Daniel Inouye (D)	Neil Abercrombie (D)	Patsy Mink (D)	Bill Clinton/ Al Gore (D) ✓
1997	Ben Cayetano (D)	Mazie Hirono (D)	23D, 2R	39D, 12R	Daniel Akaka (D)	Daniel Inouye (D)	Neil Abercrombie (D)	Patsy Mink (D)	Bill Clinton/ Al Gore (D) ✓
1998	Ben Cayetano (D)	Mazie Hirono (D)	23D, 2R	39D, 12R	Daniel Akaka (D)	Daniel Inouye (D)	Neil Abercrombie (D)	Patsy Mink (D)	Bill Clinton/ Al Gore (D) ✓
1999	Ben Cayetano (D)	Mazie Hirono (D)	23D, 2R	39D, 12R	Daniel Akaka (D)	Daniel Inouye (D)	Neil Abercrombie (D)	Patsy Mink (D)	Bill Clinton/ Al Gore (D) ✓
2000	Ben Cayetano (D)	Mazie Hirono (D)	23D, 2R	39D, 12R	Daniel Akaka (D)	Daniel Inouye (D)	Neil Abercrombie (D)	Patsy Mink (D)	Al Gore/ Joe Lieberman (D) ✗
2001	Ben Cayetano (D)	Mazie Hirono (D)	22D, 3R	32D, 19R	Daniel Akaka (D)	Daniel Inouye (D)	Neil Abercrombie (D)	Patsy Mink (D)	Al Gore/ Joe Lieberman (D) ✗
2002	Ben Cayetano (D)	Mazie Hirono (D)	22D, 3R	32D, 19R	Daniel Akaka (D)	Daniel Inouye (D)	Neil Abercrombie (D)	Patsy Mink (D)	Al Gore/ Joe Lieberman (D) ✗
2002	Ben Cayetano (D)	Mazie Hirono (D)	22D, 3R	32D, 19R	Daniel Akaka (D)	Daniel Inouye (D)	Neil Abercrombie (D)	vacant	Al Gore/ Joe Lieberman (D) ✗
2003	Linda Lingle (R)	Duke Aiona (R)	20D, 5R	36D, 15R	Daniel Akaka (D)	Daniel Inouye (D)	Neil Abercrombie (D)	Ed Case (D)	Al Gore/ Joe Lieberman (D) ✗
2004	Linda Lingle (R)	Duke Aiona (R)	20D, 5R	36D, 15R	Daniel Akaka (D)	Daniel Inouye (D)	Neil Abercrombie (D)	Ed Case (D)	John Kerry/ John Edwards (D) ✗
2005	Linda Lingle (R)	Duke Aiona (R)	20D, 5R	41D, 10R	Daniel Akaka (D)	Daniel Inouye (D)	Neil Abercrombie (D)	Ed Case (D)	John Kerry/ John Edwards (D) ✗
2006	Linda Lingle (R)	Duke Aiona (R)	20D, 5R	41D, 10R	Daniel Akaka (D)	Daniel Inouye (D)	Neil Abercrombie (D)	Ed Case (D)	John Kerry/ John Edwards (D) ✗
2007	Linda Lingle (R)	Duke Aiona (R)	20D, 5R	43D, 8R	Daniel Akaka (D)	Daniel Inouye (D)	Neil Abercrombie (D)	Mazie Hirono (D)	John Kerry/ John Edwards (D) ✗
2008	Linda Lingle (R)	Duke Aiona (R)	20D, 5R	43D, 8R	Daniel Akaka (D)	Daniel Inouye (D)	Neil Abercrombie (D)	Mazie Hirono (D)	Barack Obama/ Joe Biden (D) ✓
2009	Linda Lingle (R)	Duke Aiona (R)	23D, 2R	45D, 6R	Daniel Akaka (D)	Daniel Inouye (D)	Neil Abercrombie (D)	Mazie Hirono (D)	Barack Obama/ Joe Biden (D) ✓
2010	Linda Lingle (R)	Duke Aiona (R)	23D, 2R	45D, 6R	Daniel Akaka (D)	Daniel Inouye (D)	Charles Djou (R)	Mazie Hirono (D)	Barack Obama/ Joe Biden (D) ✓
2011	Neil Abercrombie (D)	Brian Schatz (D)	24D, 1R	43D, 8R	Daniel Akaka (D)	Daniel Inouye (D)	Colleen Hanabusa (D)	Mazie Hirono (D)	Barack Obama/ Joe Biden (D) ✓
2012	Neil Abercrombie (D)	Brian Schatz (D)	24D, 1R	43D, 8R	Daniel Akaka (D)	Daniel Inouye (D)	Colleen Hanabusa (D)	Mazie Hirono (D)	Barack Obama/ Joe Biden (D) ✓
2013	Neil Abercrombie (D)	Shan Tsutsui (D) (Note: Resigned.)	24D, 1R	44D, 7R	Mazie Hirono (D)	Brian Schatz (D) (Note: Appointed to fill a vacancy.)	Colleen Hanabusa (D)	Tulsi Gabbard (D)	Barack Obama/ Joe Biden (D) ✓
2014	Neil Abercrombie (D)	Shan Tsutsui (D)	24D, 1R	44D, 7R	Mazie Hirono (D)	Brian Schatz (D)	Colleen Hanabusa (D)	Tulsi Gabbard (D)	Barack Obama/ Joe Biden (D) ✓
2015	David Ige (D)	Shan Tsutsui (D)	24D, 1R	44D, 7R	Mazie Hirono (D)	Brian Schatz (D)	Mark Takai (D)	Tulsi Gabbard (D)	Barack Obama/ Joe Biden (D) ✓
2016	David Ige (D)	Shan Tsutsui (D)	24D, 1R	44D, 7R	Mazie Hirono (D)	Brian Schatz (D)	Mark Takai (D)	Tulsi Gabbard (D)	Hillary Clinton/ Tim Kaine (D) ✗
2017	David Ige (D)	Shan Tsutsui (D)	25D	46D, 5R	Mazie Hirono (D)	Brian Schatz (D)	Colleen Hanabusa (D)	Tulsi Gabbard (D)	Hillary Clinton/ Tim Kaine (D) ✗
2018	David Ige (D)	Doug Chin (D)	25D	46D, 5R	Mazie Hirono (D)	Brian Schatz (D)	Colleen Hanabusa (D)	Tulsi Gabbard (D)	Hillary Clinton/ Tim Kaine (D) ✗
2019	David Ige (D)	Josh Green (D)	24D, 1R	46D, 5R	Mazie Hirono (D)	Brian Schatz (D)	Ed Case (D)	Tulsi Gabbard (D)	Hillary Clinton/ Tim Kaine (D) ✗
2020	David Ige (D)	Josh Green (D)	24D, 1R	46D, 5R	Mazie Hirono (D)	Brian Schatz (D)	Ed Case (D)	Tulsi Gabbard (D)	Joe Biden/ Kamala Harris (D) ✓
2021	David Ige (D)	Josh Green (D)	24D, 1R	47D, 4R	Mazie Hirono (D)	Brian Schatz (D)	Ed Case (D)	Kai Kahele (D)	Joe Biden/ Kamala Harris (D) ✓
2022	David Ige (D)	Josh Green (D)	24D, 1R	47D, 4R	Mazie Hirono (D)	Brian Schatz (D)	Ed Case (D)	Kai Kahele (D)	Joe Biden/ Kamala Harris (D) ✓
2023	Josh Green (D)	Sylvia Luke (D)	23D, 2R	45D, 6R	Mazie Hirono (D)	Brian Schatz (D)	Ed Case (D)	Jill Tokuda (D)	Joe Biden/ Kamala Harris (D) ✓
2024	Josh Green (D)	Sylvia Luke (D)	23D, 2R	45D, 6R	Mazie Hirono (D)	Brian Schatz (D)	Ed Case (D)	Jill Tokuda (D)	Kamala Harris/ Tim Walz (D) ✗
2025	Josh Green (D)	Sylvia Luke (D)	22D, 3R	42D, 9R	Mazie Hirono (D)	Brian Schatz (D)	Ed Case (D)	Jill Tokuda (D)	Kamala Harris/ Tim Walz (D) ✗
2026	Josh Green (D)	Sylvia Luke (D)	22D, 3R	41D, 10R (Note: Elle Cochran switched party registration to Republican on March 16, 2026.)	Mazie Hirono (D)	Brian Schatz (D)	Ed Case (D)	Jill Tokuda (D)	Kamala Harris/ Tim Walz (D) ✗
2027	Josh Green (D)	Derek Kawakami (D)	22D, 2R, 1I (Note: Brenton Awa switched party registration to Independent on November 9, 2026.)	44D, 6R, 1G	Mazie Hirono (D)	Brian Schatz (D)	Ed Case (D)	Jill Tokuda (D)	Kamala Harris/ Tim Walz (D) ✗

== See also ==
- Law and government in Hawaii
- Politics of Hawaii
- Elections in Hawaii
- Government of Hawaii
