= George W. Healey =

Medal of Honor recipient

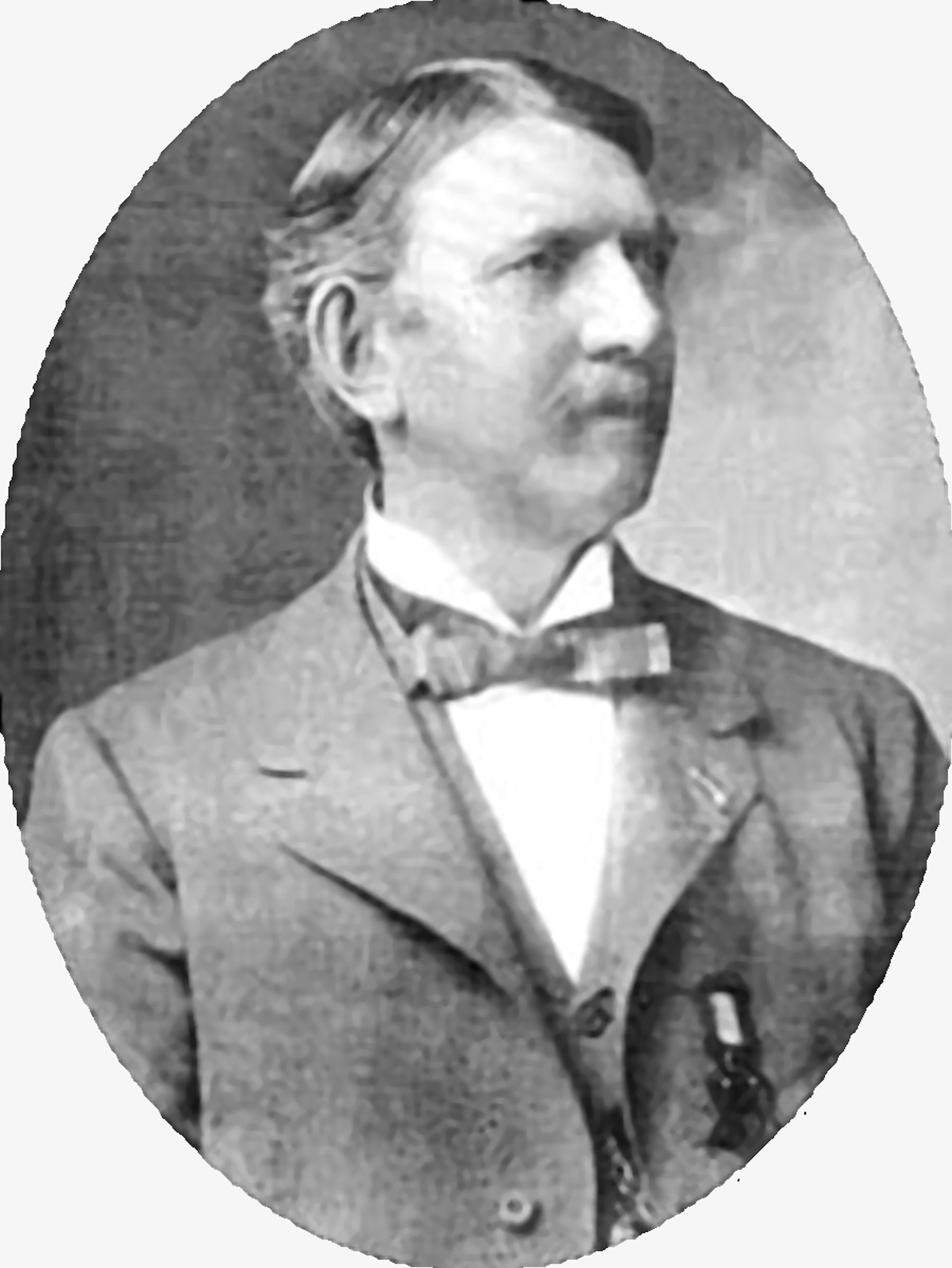
- Born: February 22, 1842; Dubuque, Iowa
- Died: May 9, 1913 (aged 71); Dubuque, Iowa
- Burial place: Linwood Cemetery
- Spouse(s): May A. Moser (1868-1908); Susie M. Burr (1908-1913)
- Military career
- Allegiance: United States of America
- Branch: United States Army
- Service years: 1861 - 1865
- Rank: Corporal
- Unit: 5th Iowa Volunteer Cavalry Regiment
- Conflicts: Civil War: Atlanta campaign; Battle of Brown's Mill
- Awards: Medal of Honor

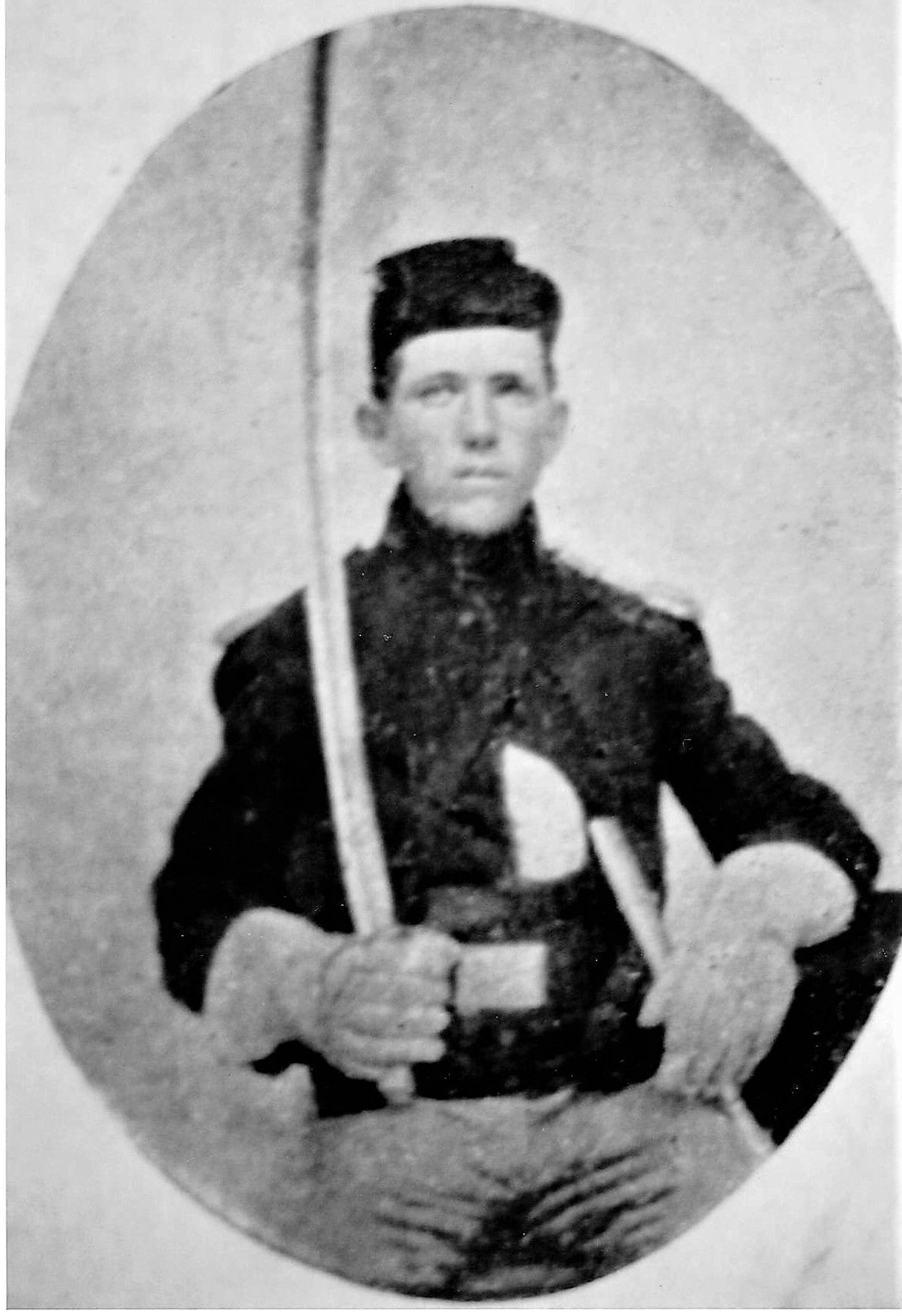
George Washington Healey, 5th Iowa Volunteer Cavalry, c1865

George W. Healey (February 22, 1842 - May 9, 1913) was a veteran of the American Civil War and a recipient of the Medal of Honor.

== Biography ==
Healy was born in 1842 in Dubuque, Iowa. During his early life, he primarily worked on his family's farm and at local hardware dealership. In 1861, upon the outbreak of the Civil War, Healely joined the army for reasons of patriotism. He claimed that anyone who did not take up arms against the South was a rebel. In 1863, Healey was wounded in the head by a ball during a skirmish with Confederate forces in Tennessee. He survived the injury, but permanently lost his vision in his left eye.

== Battle of Brown's Mill ==
In July 1864, Healey, under the command of General Edward M. McCook, was led into Georgia in an attempt to disrupt rail supplies and traffic. On July 29, was separated from his unit during an encounter with Confederate forces. Healey discovered a lone Confederate soldier and succeeded in capturing him and his firearm. Healey, joined by Private Martin, another displaced Union soldier, captured four more Confederates who had been trailing them.

McCook's invasion of Georgia was ultimately a failure, and many of his soldiers, including Healey, were captured. Healey was ultimately sent to Andersonville Prison.

== Citation ==
When nearly surrounded by the enemy, captured a Confederate soldier, and with the aid of a comrade who joined him later, captured 4 other Confederate soldiers, disarmed the 5 prisoners, and brought them all into the Union lines.

== Later life ==
Healely survived his capture and stay at Andersonville. In 1868, he married May Moser. He also worked at the Doolittle & Chamberlain business as a bookkeeper and salesmen. He later became a partner in the business and expanded it greatly. Healey died in 1913.

== See also ==
- 5th Iowa Volunteer Cavalry Regiment
- Atlanta campaign
- Battle of Brown's Mill
