= Horace S. Cooley =

American politician (1806–1850)

Horace S. Cooley (1806 – April 2, 1850) was an American politician.

Born in Hartford, Connecticut, Cooley studied medicine and then law. In 1840, Cooley moved to Rushville, Illinois and then finally settled in Quincy, Illinois. In 1842, Cooley was appointed quartermaster general of Illinois. In 1846, Cooley was appointed to and then elected Illinois Secretary of State. Cooley was a Democrat. He died in 1850 while still in office.

== Notes ==
Political offices
Preceded by Thompson Campbell	Secretary of State of Illinois; 1846–1850	Succeeded by David L. Gregg
