= The Oregonian Printing Press Park =

Public park in Portland, Oregon, U.S.

Coordinates: 45.5179°N 122.6733°W

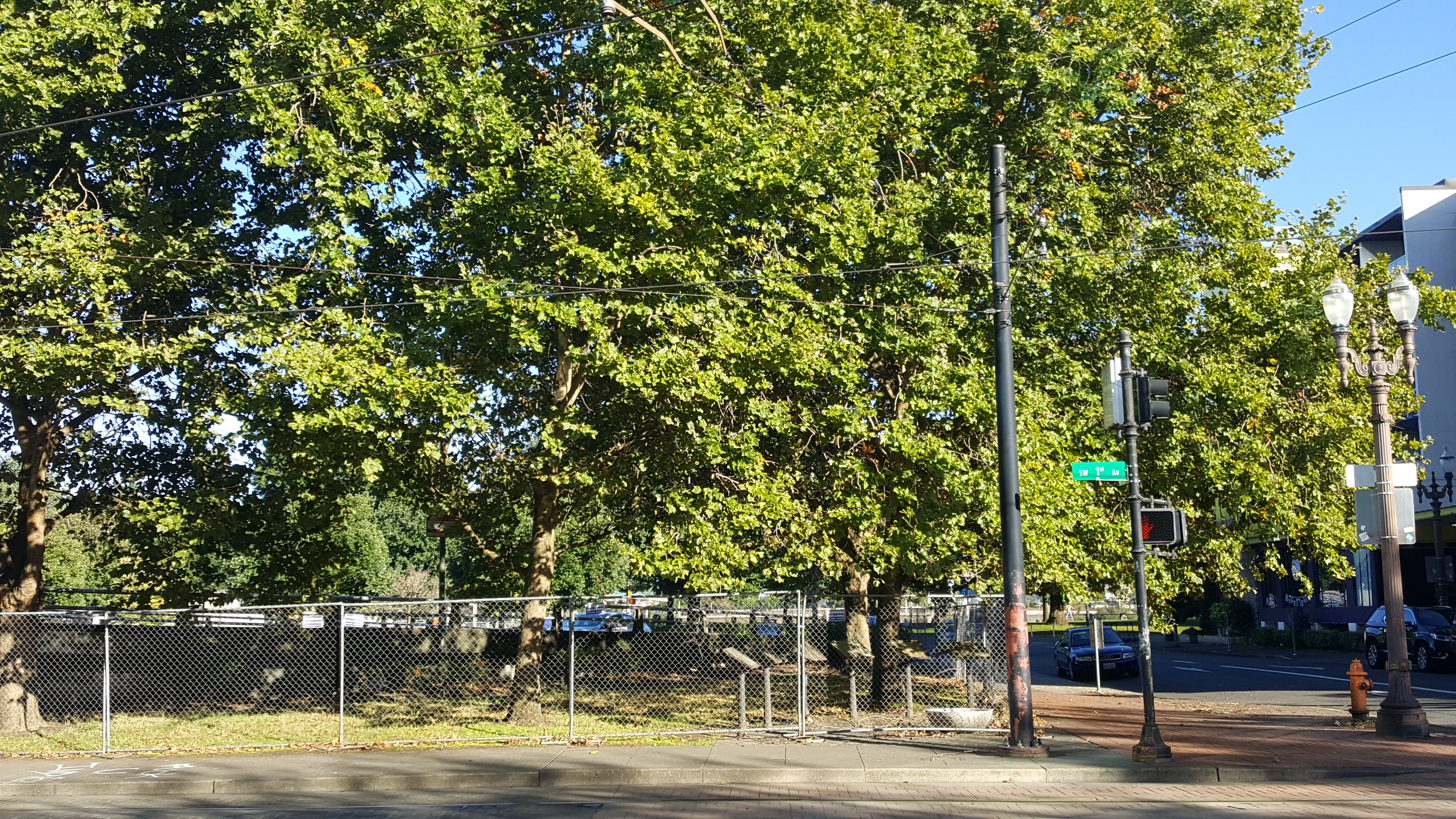
- The park enclosed by wired fencing in 2020
- Interactive map of The Oregonian Printing Press Park
- Location: Portland, Oregon, U.S.

The Oregonian Printing Press Park, or simply Printing Press Park, is a triangular 1,000-square-foot park on the southeastern corner of the intersection of Southwest First Avenue and Morrison Street in Portland, Oregon, United States. The green space marks where editor Thomas J. Dryer operated a small press to publish Portland's weekly newspaper, which would become The Oregonian, beginning on December 4, 1850.

== See also ==
- List of parks in Portland, Oregon
