= Thompson Campbell =

American politician

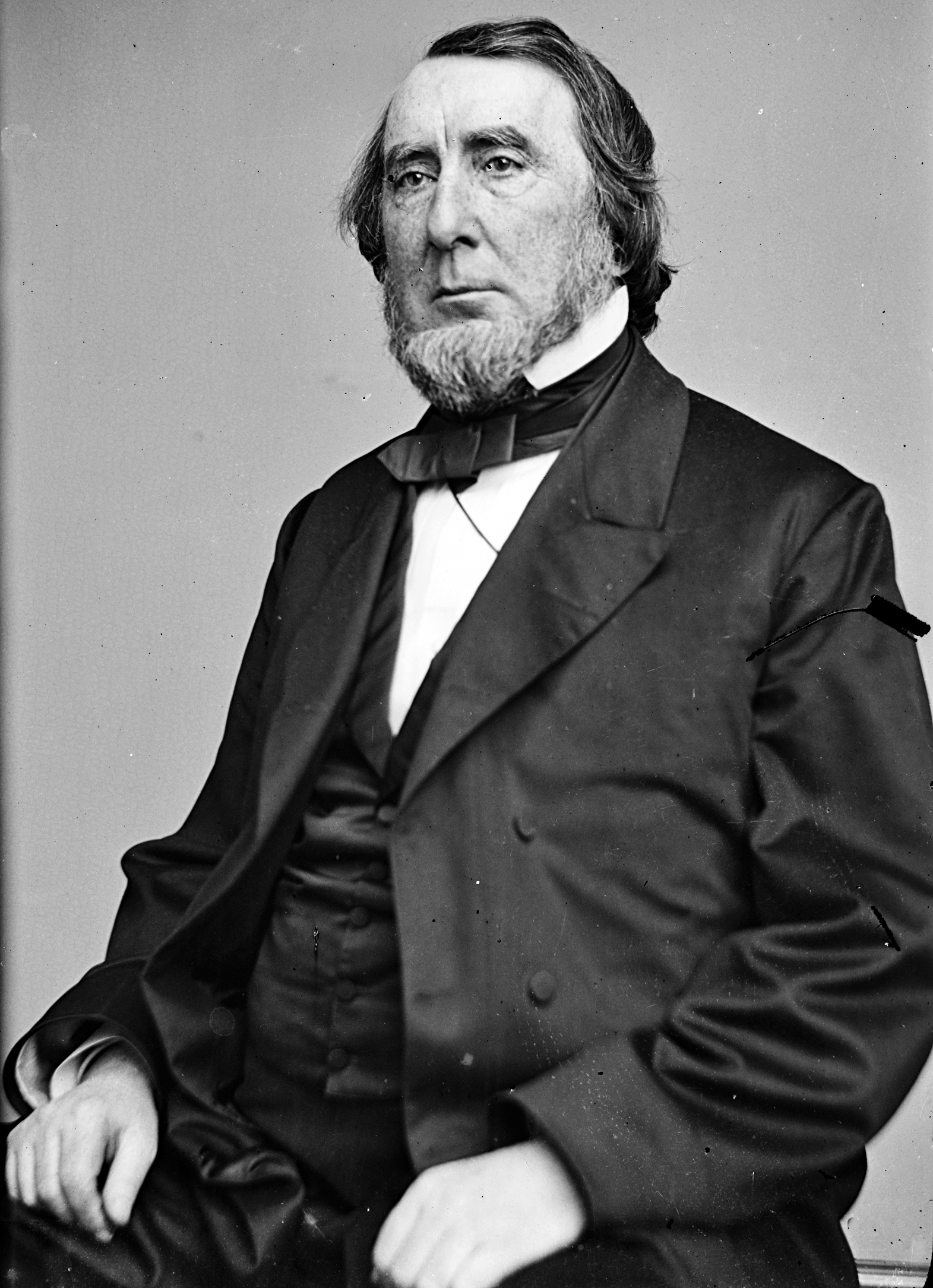

Member of the U.S. House of Representatives from Illinois's 6th district
- In office March 4, 1851 – March 3, 1853
- Preceded by: Edward Dickinson Baker
- Succeeded by: Richard Yates

9th Secretary of State of Illinois
- In office 1843–1846
- Governor: Thomas Ford
- Preceded by: Lyman Trumbull
- Succeeded by: Horace S. Cooley

Personal details
- Born: c. 1811 Kennett Square, PA
- Died: December 6, 1868 (aged 56–57) San Francisco, California, U.S.
- Resting place: Laurel Hill Cemetery
- Party: Democratic

Thompson Campbell (c. 1811 – December 6, 1868) was an American businessman and lawyer who served one term as a U.S. representative from Illinois from 1851 to 1853.

== Life ==
Thompson Campbell's parents immigrated to the United States in 1801, and settled in Kennett Square, Chester County, Pennsylvania for ten years. He attended public schools, studied law, and was admitted to the bar in Pittsburgh, Pennsylvania. He later moved to Galena, Illinois, and engaged in mining.

=== Political career ===
Campbell served as the Illinois Secretary of State from 1843 until his resignation in 1846. He was a delegate to the state constitutional convention in 1847.

He was elected as a Democrat to the 32nd Congress in 1850, and was an unsuccessful candidate for reelection in 1852.

He was a delegate at the 1852 Democratic National Convention and was appointed United States land commissioner for California by President Pierce in 1853 and served until he resigned in 1855. At the 1860 Democratic National Convention, he served as a delegate in Charleston, North Carolina and became an elector at large on the Breckinridge ticket.

During the Civil War, he served in the California State Assembly as a member of the Union Party and was a delegate to the 1864 Republican National Convention.

=== Death ===
He died in San Francisco, California on December 6, 1868, and is interred in Laurel Hill Cemetery.

Political offices
Preceded by Lyman Trumbull	Illinois Secretary of State; 1843–1846	Succeeded by Horace S. Cooley
U.S. House of Representatives
Preceded by Edward D. Baker	United States Representative for the 6th Congressional District of Illinois; 1851–1853	Succeeded by Richard Yates
