= Lunalilo Party =

- Headquarters: Honolulu, Hawaii
- Ideology: Kalaimamahu Royalism; Liberalism; Egalitarianism; Pro-American

The Lunalilo Party was a political party in Hawaii, formed to support William Charles Lunalilo in the Royal Election of 1873 in which he won against David Kalākaua. He was known as being liberal, pro-democracy, and pro-American.
