= Battle of Brown's Mill =

Battle of the American Civil War

Coordinates: 33.334533°N 84.838752°W

- Part of the American Civil War
Date	July 30, 1864
Location	Coweta County, Georgia
Result	Confederate victory

Belligerents
United States (Union)	(Confederate States of America) CSA (Confederacy)

Commanders and leaders
Edward M. McCook	Joseph Wheeler

Units involved
First Cavalry Division; Army of the Cumberland	Cavalry Corps; Army of Tennessee

Casualties and losses
1,250	50

The Battle of Brown's Mill was fought July 30, 1864, in Coweta County, Georgia, during the Atlanta campaign of the American Civil War. Edward M. McCook's Union cavalry, on a daring raid to sever communications and supply lines in south-central Georgia, was defeated near Newnan, Georgia, by Confederate forces under Joseph Wheeler. The failure of McCook's column and a concurrent ill-fated raid by George Stoneman forced William T. Sherman to lay siege to the city of Atlanta.

== Background ==
During the Atlanta Campaign, Gen. William T. Sherman, wanting to avoid the necessity of laying siege to the city, ordered two columns of Federal cavalry on a series of raids south of Atlanta in an attempt to cut off supply and communication lines. Maj. Gen. George Stoneman led the cavalry of the Army of the Ohio to the southeast, while Brig. Gen. Edward M. McCook’s First Division of the cavalry of the Army of the Cumberland was to sever railroads southwest of the city. He was to link with Stoneman and then seize the Andersonville prison camp and free the 32,000 prisoners held there.

Crossing the Chattahoochee River on a pontoon bridge erected at Smith's Ferry, McCook's cavalrymen reached Palmetto, where they cut the Atlanta & West Point Railroad. They captured and burned over 1,000 Confederate supply wagons at Fayetteville on July 28. General McCook also gained a reputation for condoning and encouraging the destruction of civilian property. Early the next morning, his raiders reached Lovejoy's Station, twenty-three miles south of Atlanta, and began wrecking the Macon & Western Railroad. However, McCook called off the raid and turned back across the river when Stoneman failed to appear as planned.

== The battle ==
Nevertheless, as they tried to return to the main army, McCook's division was attacked near Brown's Mill, three miles south of Newnan, by Confederate cavalry under Joseph Wheeler. McCook wanted to surrender, but instead, let his officers lead their battalions out separately. McCook, thoroughly defeated, lost 1,285 men, 1,200 horses, several ambulances, and two pieces of spiked artillery, as well as 100 killed and wounded. Wheeler also freed some 300 Confederate prisoners that McCook had previously captured. Wheeler's losses were 50 men.

Stoneman's forces also met with disaster. General Stoneman was captured, becoming the highest ranking Union officer to be a prisoner of war during the Civil War. Many of his and McCook's enlisted men ironically wound up in Andersonville, the target of their raid. Brown's Mill changed the course of the Atlanta Campaign, forcing Sherman to abandon his efforts to use cavalry to cut Atlanta's railroads and compelling him to begin a lengthy siege against his wishes.

McCook later took his remaining men northward into Tennessee when Sherman sent the Army of the Cumberland to chase John Bell Hood. McCook fought with distinction during the rest of the war, with his stunning defeat to a lesser force at Brown's Mill the major blemish on his service record.
