= List of ministers of the United States to Hawaii =

Former diplomatic office

Minister of the United States to Hawaii
- Seal of the United States Department of State
- Incumbent; None
- Nominator: The president of the United States
- Inaugural holder: John Coffin Jones Jr. as Agent for Commerce and Seamen
- Formation: 1820
- Abolished: August 12, 1898

The United States minister to Hawaii was an officer of the United States Department of State to the Kingdom of Hawaii during the period of 1810 to 1898. Appointed by the president of the United States with the consent of Congress, the minister to Hawaii was equivalent in rank to the present-day ambassador of the United States to foreign governments. As principal envoy of the United States government to the monarch of Hawaii, the minister to Hawaii often dealt in affairs relating to economic, military and political matters affecting both nations. The minister to Hawaii also represented the interests of American citizens residing and working in Hawaii, conveying their concerns over United States foreign policy to the president of the United States.

Two ministers to Hawaii became paramount figures in the history of Hawaiian Islands. John L. Stevens, appointed by President Benjamin Harrison, was accused of being a conspirator in the overthrow of the monarchy of Queen Liliʻuokalani. James Henderson Blount, appointed by President Grover Cleveland, investigated the overthrow, submitting a report on July 17, 1893, resulting in the dismissal of Stevens from his foreign service career and the recommendation by Cleveland to restore the monarchy. Following Blount's report, and the refusal of the Provisional Government to abide by Cleveland's wishes, a Senate committee appointed by Cleveland to further investigate the matter exonerated Stevens and the U.S. peacekeepers from any role in the Hawaiian Revolution, submitting the Morgan Report on February 26, 1894. Following that final investigation on the matter, Cleveland rebuffed further requests from the queen for interference and engaged in normal diplomatic relations with both the Provisional Government and the Republic of Hawaii.

== Agents and consuls ==
The first representatives were given the unpaid title of Agent for Commerce and Seamen and in 1844 given the title of Consul. There are gaps and overlaps in the dates due to the six-month journey from the eastern United States to Hawaii at the time.

- John Coffin Jones Jr. 1820–1839
- Peter A. Brinsmade April 1839 – July 1844
- Alexander G. Abell July 1844 – June 1846
- Joel Turrill 1846–1850
- Elisha Hunt Allen 1850–1853
- Benjamin Franklin Angel 1853–1854?
- Darius A. Ogden 1854–1857
- Abner Pratt 1857—1859
- Zephaniah Swift Spalding 1868–1869

In 1850 Charles Bunker was added as a consul in Lahaina.

== Commissioners ==
In 1843 the diplomatic representative was called Commissioner.

- George Brown March 1843 – 1846
- Anthony Ten Eyke 1846–1849
- Charles Eames January 12, 1849 – October 29, 1849
- Luther Severance June 7, 1850 – 1853
- David L. Gregg 1853–1859
- James W. Borden 1859–1861
- Thomas J. Dryer June 15, 1861 – June 20, 1863

== List of ministers ==
This is a list of American ministers (replacing the rank of commissioner, similar to current rank of ambassador) to the Kingdom of Hawaii from 1863 to 1893.

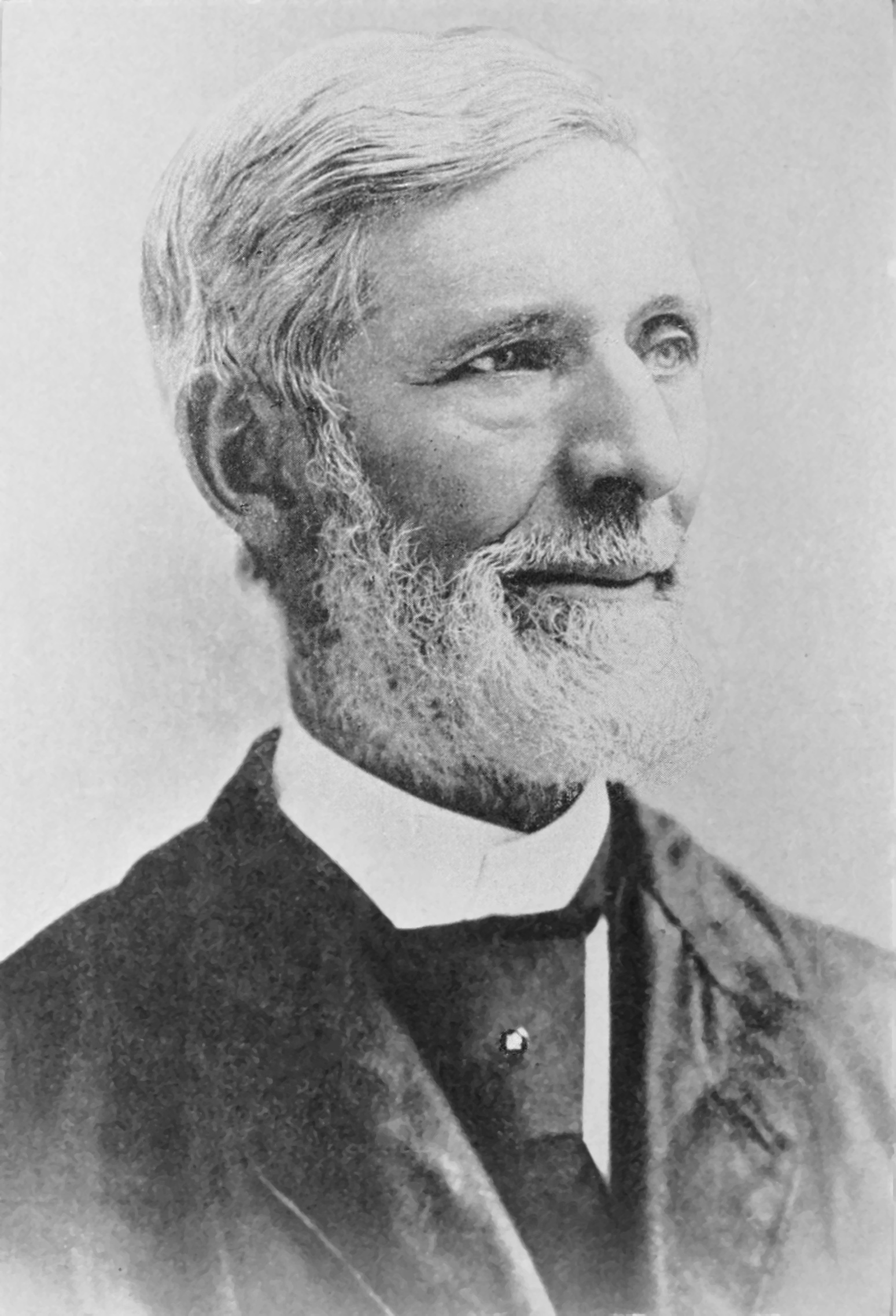
John L. Stevens, United States Minister to Hawaii, ordered the landing of the United States Marine Corps on Oʻahu which has been subjected to competing historical interpretations.

- James McBride – 1863 to 1866
- Edward M. McCook – 1866 to 1868
- Henry A. Peirce – 1869 to 1877
- James M. Comly – 1877 to 1882
- Rollin M. Daggett – 1882 to 1885
- George W. Merrill – 1885 to 1889
- John L. Stevens – 1889 to 1893
- James H. Blount – 1893 to 1893
- Albert Sydney Willis – 1893 to 1897
- Harold M. Sewall – 1897 to August 12, 1898

== See also ==
- Relations between the Kingdom of Hawaii and the United States
