= James W. Borden =

American jurist and diplomat (1810–1882)

James Wallace Borden (February 5, 1810 – April 25, 1882) was an American jurist in Indiana and diplomat.

== Life ==
James Wallace Borden was born near Beaufort, North Carolina on February 5, 1810. His father was Joseph Borden (1769–1825) and mother Esther Wallace (1771–1853). He was educated at Fairfeld Academy in Herkimer, New York and at Windsor, Connecticut. He read for and passed his bar exam in 1831. In 1835 he moved to Richmond, Indiana, and in 1839 to Fort Wayne, Indiana. He ran the federal land office in Fort Wayne and was elected as judge of the 12th district of Indianain 1841. In 1850 he was a member of the Indiana state constitutional convention. He ran as a Democrat for the US Congress House of Representatives in 1851 but lost the general election. In 1852 he was elected again as judge.

Borden was appointed U.S. Commissioner to the Kingdom of Hawaii by James Buchanan on January 11, 1858. He presented his credentials on May 21, 1858, to King Kamehameha IV. The king made a welcoming speech, but the situation was a tense peace between Scottish-born Hawaii foreign minister Robert Crichton Wyllie and US Secretary of State Lewis Cass. There was a minor territorial dispute over the remote Johnston Atoll. A highlight was the visit on March 5, 1860, of the USS Powhatan which included Japanese ambassadors on a visit to the United States. President Abraham Lincoln appointed Thomas J. Dryer to be the new Commissioner to Hawaii, and Borden was recalled on June 8, 1861.

Borden took a tour of Asia and Europe before returning to Indiana. he was elected again as judge in 1864 and 1867 moved to the criminal court, and held that post until his death. He died in 1882. He was buried in Lindenwood Cemetery in Fort Wayne. He married Emeline Griswold in 1832 had seven children, and after her death married Jane Conklin on August 15, 1848, having one additional son, David Henry Borden in May 1863.

His brother, physician Joseph Borden (1806–1875) and his family moved to California and named the town of Borden, California.

His son George Pennington Borden (1844–1925) enlisted in the American Civil War, graduated from the United States Military Academy in 1864, and retired as a brigadier general in 1907. He was buried in Arlington National Cemetery.

Diplomatic posts
Preceded by David L. Gregg	U.S. Commissioner to Hawaii; January 11, 1858 – June 8, 1861	Succeeded by Thomas J. Dryer
