= James McBride (politician) =

American politician and diplomat

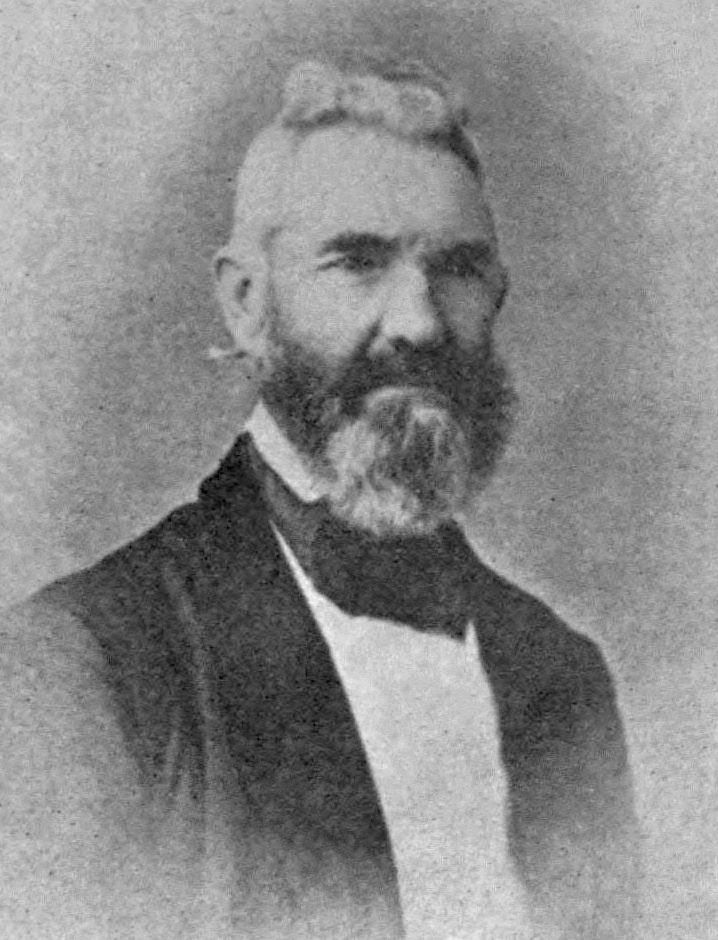

1st United States Minister to Hawaii
- In office June 19, 1863 – July 26, 1866
- President: Abraham Lincoln; Andrew Johnson
- Preceded by: Thomas J. Dryer (as Commissioner)
- Succeeded by: Edward M. McCook

Personal details
- Born: February 9, 1802 Nashville, Tennessee, U.S.
- Died: December 18, 1875 (aged 73) St. Helens, Oregon, U.S.
- Party: Republican
- Spouse: Mahala Miller
- Relations: George L. Woods
- Children: George W. McBride; John R. McBride; Thomas A. McBride
- Profession: Politician, diplomat, physician

James McBride (February 9, 1802 – December 18, 1875) was an American politician, educator, and patriarch of a political family in the state of Oregon. A native of Tennessee, he served in the Oregon Territorial Legislature and as United States Minister to Hawaii, as well as one of the founders of the Oregon Republican Party. Two of his sons served in the United States Congress, while a third served on the Oregon Supreme Court.

== Early life ==
James McBride was born near present-day Nashville, Tennessee, on February 9, 1802. He was educated in Nashville and then moved to Missouri where he married Mahala Miller in Springfield on June 20, 1830. Together they had fourteen children. James practiced medicine there before the family immigrated to Oregon Country in 1846 settling near Lafayette, Oregon. In Oregon he taught school, practiced medicine, farmed, and preached.

== Politics ==
In 1850, he was elected to the Territorial Council, the upper chamber of the Oregon Territorial Legislature. He was later named Oregon Territory's first school superintendent.

In 1863, McBride was appointed by President Abraham Lincoln as Minister to the Kingdom of Hawaii. During his time in that position he began the negotiations with Russia for the purchase of Alaska, and then later was involved in settling the Beresford Incident with Great Britain. He served until 1866, retired from government service in 1867 and settled at St. Helens, Oregon.

Two of McBride's sons served in the United States Congress representing Oregon: George W. McBride served as a Senator and John R. McBride served as a Representative. Another son, Thomas A. McBride, was chief justice of the Oregon Supreme Court, and a daughter, Louisa, married Oregon's third governor, George L. Woods.

Diplomatic posts
| Preceded by Thomas J. Dryer as Commissioner | United States Minister to Hawaii; June 19, 1863 – July 26, 1866 | Succeeded by Edward M. McCook |
