= Thomas J. Dryer =

American journalist

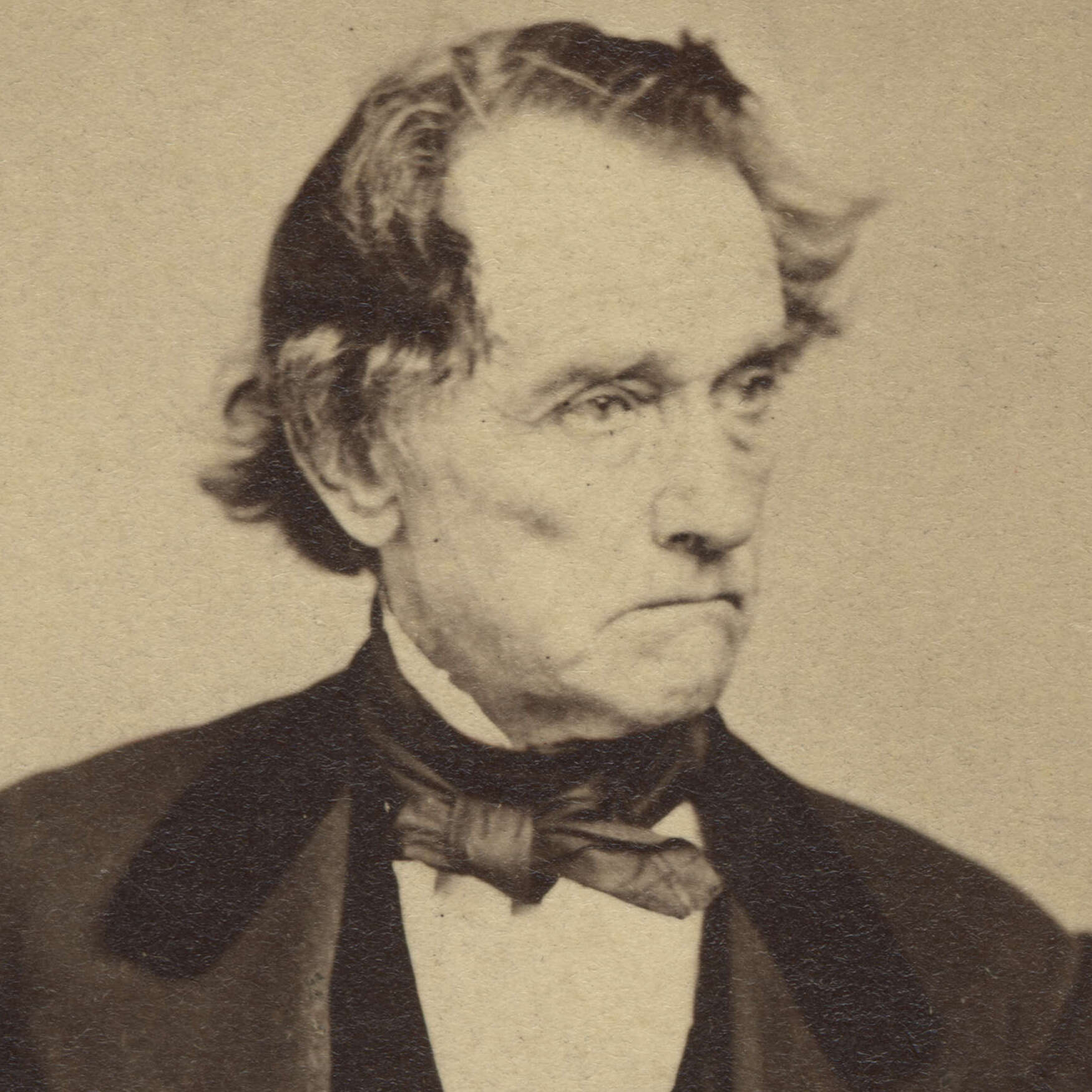
- Dryer c. 1868

United States Commissioner to Hawaii
- In office June 8, 1861 – June 18, 1863
- President: Abraham Lincoln
- Preceded by: James W. Borden
- Succeeded by: James McBride (as Minister)

Member of the Oregon Constitutional Convention
- In office 1857
- Constituency: Washington and Multnomah counties

Member of the Oregon Territorial Legislature
- In office 1856–1856
- Constituency: Washington and Multnomah counties

Personal details
- Born: January 8, 1808 Kingston, New York, United States
- Died: March 30, 1879 (aged 71) Oregon
- Party: Whig Party; Republican Party
- Occupation: Newspaper publisher

Thomas Jefferson Dryer (January 8, 1808 – March 30, 1879) was a newspaper publisher and politician in the Western United States. A member of the Oregon Territorial Legislature in 1857, Dryer is best remembered as the founder of The Oregonian, an influential and enduring newspaper in the American state of Oregon.

Dryer was also a committed mountain climber and is credited with being among the first to summit Mount St. Helens and perhaps Mount Hood.

== Biography ==
=== Early years ===
Thomas Jefferson Dryer was born on January 8, 1808, in Ulster County, New York.

=== Move to Portland ===
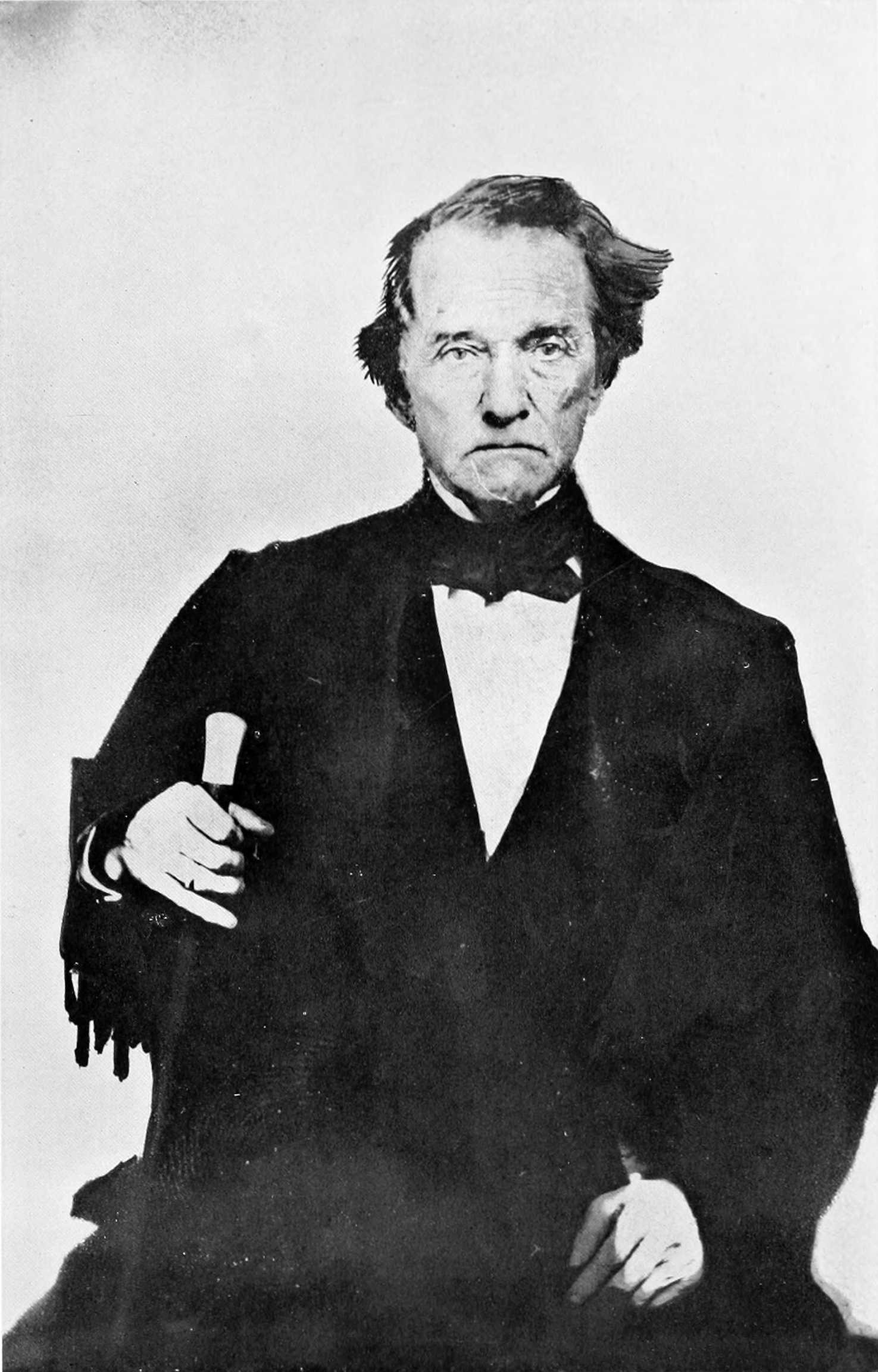
Dryer from Centennial History of Oregon

After working as a journalist in New York state, Dryer came to San Francisco in 1849 with a hand-operated printing press in tow, seeking a suitable location to establish a newspaper of his own.

Dryer was the founding editor of the Portland Oregonian in Dec. 1850.

He initially launched a publication called the California Courier, but with limited success. While in San Francisco Dryer was recruited to relocate north to the town of Portland, Oregon by Stephen Coffin and William W. Chapman, founders and leading boosters of the fledgling enclave.

Coffin and Chapman provided a crude log cabin to Dryer to set up his press and establish his newspaper office. He was able to release the first issue of his publication, The Weekly Oregonian, on December 4, 1850 — about two weeks after the launch six miles to the south in Milwaukie, Oregon by Lot Whitcomb, The Western Star, a rival publication.

=== Political career ===
In 1856, Dryer served in the Territorial Legislature representing Multnomah and Washington Counties as a Whig. The following year, he was elected and served at the Oregon Constitutional Convention.

Dryer became a Republican and was an active supporter of Abraham Lincoln in the Presidential election of 1860, winning election as a presidential elector. Following Lincoln's victory, Dryer called in a political favor and was appointed U.S. Commissioner to the Kingdom of Hawaii.

Dryer was a heavy drinker and it was not long until his taste for alcohol was drawing public scrutiny and criticism. In March 1862 Dryer's longtime publishing rival and political foe Asahel Bush gleefully reprinted a snippet from the Yreka Union charging that the "Bad Egg" T. J. Dryer "is so constantly drunk as to render him unfit to discharge the duties of his office." By the summer of 1863 the same paper would be able to cheerfully report that "Ex-Commissioner T.J. Dryer has arrived at San Francisco, on his return from the Sandwich Islands."

=== Loss of the Oregonian ===
During Dryer's absence The Oregonian was published by Henry Lewis Pittock, a compositor and pressman who had been on the paper's staff since November 1853. Dryer was deeply in debt to Pittock for unpaid back wages and he mortgaged the publication to him as security on the unpaid debt. When Dryer made no further attempt at repayment, ownership of the Oregonian passed into Pittock's hands.

Pittock would later go into business partnership with longtime editorialist Harvey W. Scott and The Oregonian would come to see its place cemented as the state's de facto newspaper of record during the 20th century.

=== Mountain climber ===
Dryer is credited with being part of the first documented ascent of Mount St. Helens on August 27, 1853, together with three companions. He has also been reported as among the first party to climb Mount Hood, on August 8, 1854. This latter report has been disputed, with most historians claiming the Dryer attempt fell several hundred feet of the summit of Mount Hood, while an 1857 climb by Henry Lewis Pittock and four others provided better documentation of the summit having been reached.

=== Death and legacy ===
Dryer died March 30, 1879. He was 71 years old at the time of his death. He was buried at Lone Fir Cemetery in Portland.

Mount St. Helens' Dryer Glacier, which disappeared following the eruption of 1980, was named for Dryer.

== See also ==
- The Oregonian Printing Press Park

== Footnotes ==
Diplomatic posts
Preceded by James W. Borden	U.S. Commissioner to Hawaii; June 15, 1861 – June 20, 1863	Succeeded by James McBride
