= James M. Comly =

American journalist

James Munroe Stuart Comly
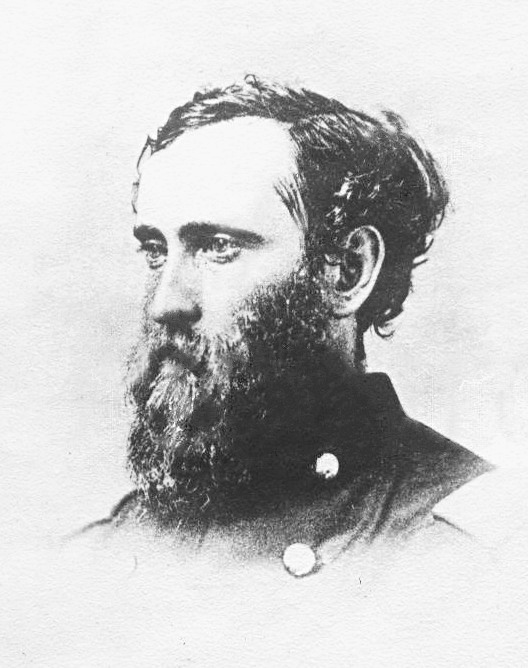

United States Minister to Hawaii
- In office September 25, 1877 – August 21, 1882
- President: Rutherford B. Hayes; James A. Garfield; Chester A. Arthur
- Preceded by: Henry Augustus Peirce
- Succeeded by: Rollin M. Daggett

Personal details
- Born: March 6, 1832 New Lexington, Ohio, US
- Died: July 26, 1887 (aged 55) Toledo, Ohio, US
- Resting place: Green Lawn Cemetery, Columbus, Ohio
- Occupation: Soldier, journalism, diplomat

Military service
- Allegiance: United States of America; Union
- Branch/service: United States Army; Union Army
- Rank: Colonel; Brevet Brigadier General
- Commands: 23rd Ohio Infantry
- Battles/wars: American Civil War

James Munroe Stuart Comly (March 6, 1832 – July 26, 1887) was an American soldier, diplomat, and newspaper editor. Before and after his service as Colonel in the Union Army during the American Civil War, he was a journalist, attorney, newspaper editor and owner; after the war, he became a historian and diplomat. Comly was also instrumental in advancing the political career of his friend Rutherford B. Hayes, the 19th President of the United States; Hayes would go on to appoint him as United States Minister to Hawaii. In 1866, he was nominated and confirmed as a brevet brigadier general of volunteers, to rank from March 13, 1865.

== Early life and career ==
Comly was born on a farm near the city of New Lexington, Ohio. He was descended from a family of Quakers who had moved to Perry County from Philadelphia and established a series of sawmills. When his father died when Comly was only ten years old, he moved to Columbus and worked in a printing shop as a messenger, before becoming an apprentice and journeyman printer. He studied law and served as the chief law clerk for the Ohio Secretary of State, which exposed him to politics. He began writing articles for newspapers and joined the fledgling Republican Party, supporting John C. Frémont for president in 1856 and Abraham Lincoln in 1860. He was the editor of the leading Republican newspaper, the Ohio State Journal.

== Civil War ==
When hostilities broke out between the North and South, Comly enlisted in the Union Army in December 1861, being appointed by Republican Governor William Dennison as major of the 23rd Ohio Volunteer Infantry, an appointment at first not popular with the men as several experienced captains were passed over for the political appointee, Comly. The regiment was assigned to Raleigh, North Carolina, and Comly participated in several battles in the state. He was promoted to lieutenant colonel.

When the commander of the regiment, Rutherford B. Hayes, was wounded at the Battle of South Mountain, Comly assumed command and led the 23rd OVI at Antietam and several subsequent campaigns in the IX Corps until Hayes recovered. In 1863, Comly married Elizabeth Smith, the daughter of the Surgeon General of Ohio.

In February 1864, when Hayes was promoted to division command, Comly was named as his successor as colonel of the regiment, which he led for much of the remainder of the war until lingering effects from battlefield wounds forced him out of the field in early 1865. On January 13, 1866, President Andrew Johnson nominated Comly for appointment to the grade of brevet brigadier general of volunteers, to rank from March 13, 1865, and the United States Senate confirmed the appointment on March 12, 1866.

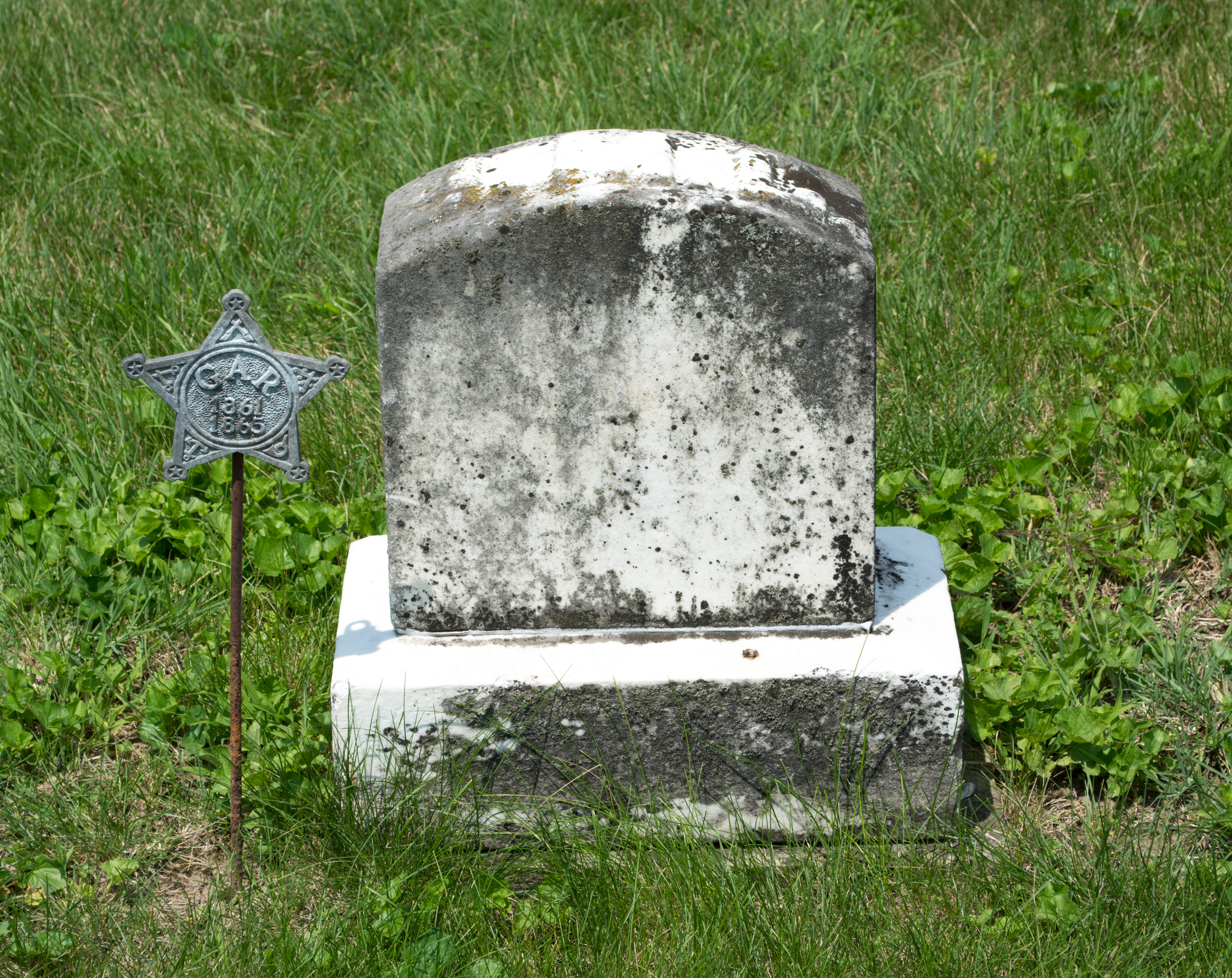
Headstone

== Postbellum ==
Following the war, Comly returned to his political newspaper and was editor and publisher of the Ohio State Journal, a powerful influence in helping his friend Hayes be elected Governor of Ohio. Comly guided the newspaper into statewide prominence (it would last until 1985 as The Columbus Citizen-Journal). In April 1866, Comly established a local baseball team in Columbus and became the sport's major promoter and advocate in the region. President Ulysses S. Grant appointed him as Postmaster of Columbus.

When Hayes was elected president in 1876, he rewarded Comly for his support by naming him the U.S. Minister to Hawaii, a post he held until 1882. He served as a presidential elector in 1884, supporting James G. Blaine. Comly moved to Toledo, Ohio, and became editor of the Toledo Commercial.

In the last years of his life, Comly suffered much from his old Civil War wounds. He died in Toledo, Ohio at the age of 55 and was buried in Green Lawn Cemetery in Columbus.

== See also ==
- List of American Civil War brevet generals (Union)
- List of Ohio's American Civil War generals
