= David L. Gregg =

American politician (1819–1968)

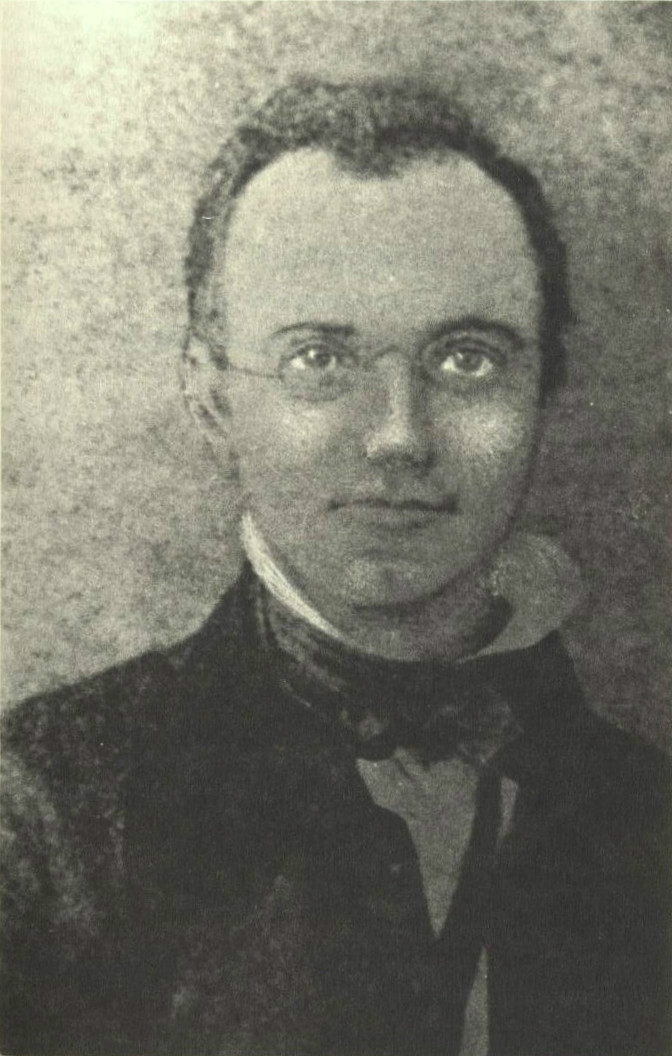

United States Commissioner to the Kingdom of Hawaii
- In office December 20, 1853 – May 21, 1858
- President: Franklin Pierce
- Preceded by: Luther Severance
- Succeeded by: James W. Borden

11th Illinois Secretary of State
- In office 1850–1853
- Governor: Augustus C. French
- Preceded by: Horace S. Cooley
- Succeeded by: Alexander Starne

Minister of Finance
- In office May 26, 1858 – August 18, 1862
- Preceded by: Robert C. Wyllie
- Succeeded by: Robert C. Wyllie

Personal details
- Born: July 21, 1819 Pennsylvania, U.S.
- Died: December 23, 1868 (aged 49) Carson City, Nevada, U.S.
- Party: Democratic
- Spouse(s): Eliza Byrne, Rebecca Eads
- Profession: Attorney, publisher

David Lawrence Gregg (July 21, 1819 – December 23, 1868) was an American politician from New York State. He rose to prominence in Illinois politics, first in the Illinois House of Representatives, then as United States Attorney, and Illinois Secretary of State. In 1853, Franklin Pierce appointed Gregg the Commissioner to the Kingdom of Hawaii to negotiate its annexation at the request of its king, Kamehameha III. In response, he cited the U.S. Constitution as not allowing annexation of a foreign state. (Texas had, in fact, been annexed a few years before with dubious legality.) His later years were spent in Carson City, Nevada.

== Biography ==
David Lawrence Gregg was born in Richfield, New York State on July 21, 1819, the son of Asa Gregg and his wife Viletta (or Violetta) Seymour.He had at least one brother, DeRoss Gregg. He graduated from Union College, Schenectady, New York. He then moved west and settled in Joliet, Illinois, to practice law. He edited the Juliet Courier, the first paper in Will County, Illinois. Gregg was elected to the Illinois House of Representatives in 1842, serving two two-year terms. Gregg then accepted an appointment by President James K. Polk as United States Attorney for the District of Illinois. He was a delegate to the Illinois Constitutional Convention of 1847, representing Cook County. In 1850, he was named the Illinois Secretary of State as a Democrat, filling the unexpired term of the deceased Horace S. Cooley. Gregg was then re-elected to a two-year term. He then was a presidential elector for the 1852 election. He was a leading candidate in 1852 for the Democratic nomination as Governor of Illinois, but was defeated by Joel Aldrich Matteson.

President Franklin Pierce then appointed Gregg the Commissioner to the Kingdom of Hawaii. He was involved with unsuccessful annexation discussions with the Hawaiian monarchy. In 1857, he left the office to become Hawaiian finance minister. Gregg returned to the United States, settling in Carson City, Nevada. President Andrew Johnson commissioned him receiver of public moneys for the district of lands subject to sale in the city.

Gregg married Eliza Byrne in LaSalle, Illinois on June 1, 1842. She died on August 8, 1848 at their residence in Chicago. He married Rebecca Eads, daughter of Abner Eads, a powerful Illinois political figure, on September 1, 1850 in Galena, Illinois. He died in Carson City on December 23, 1868, and was buried in Lone Mountain Cemetery.

Political offices
Preceded by Horace S. Cooley	Secretary of State of Illinois; 1850–1853	Succeeded by Alexander Starne
