= Edward M. McCook =

American general and politician

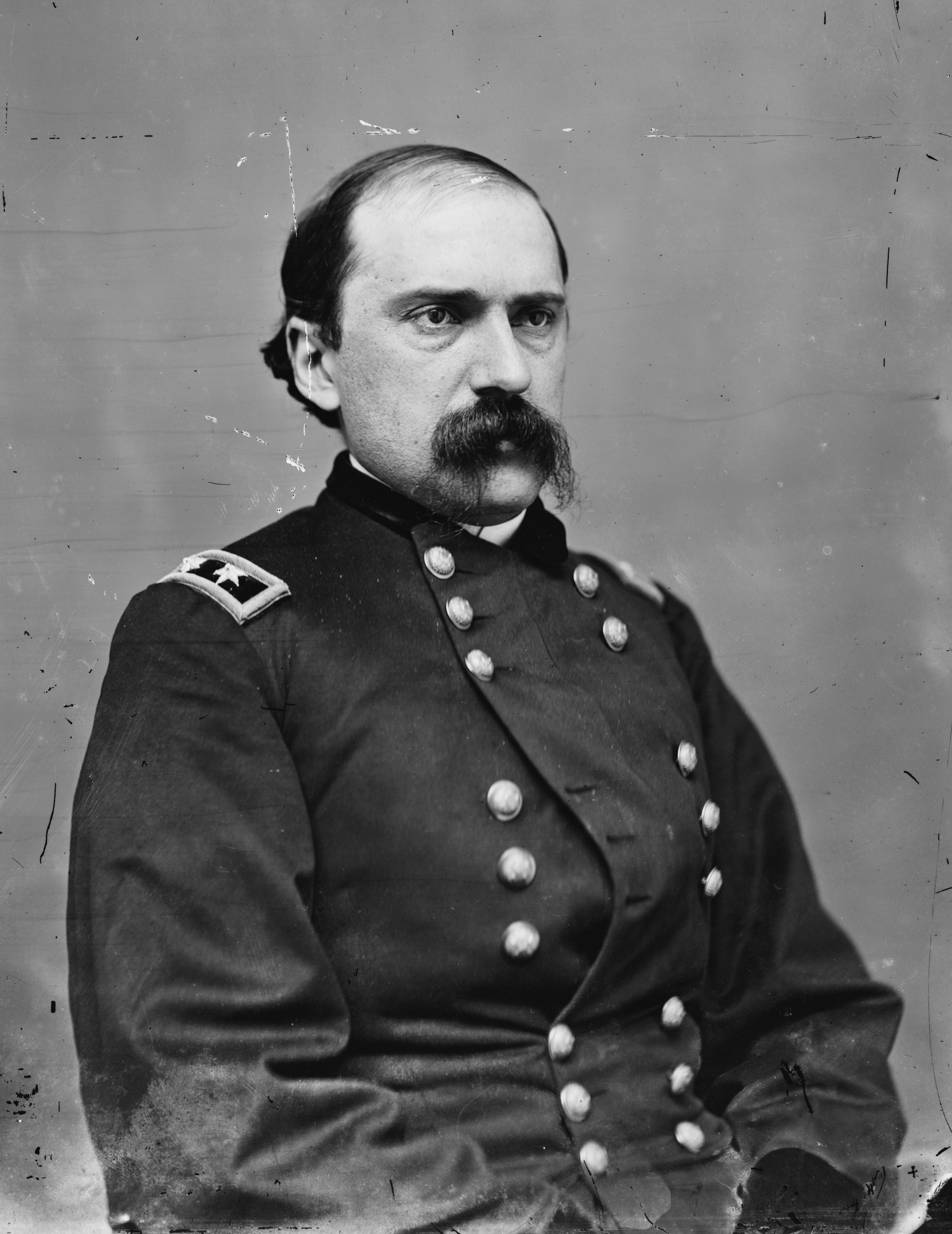

5th and 7th Governor of the Territory of Colorado
- In office June 19, 1874 – March 29, 1875
- Preceded by: Samuel Hitt Elbert
- Succeeded by: John Long Routt
- In office June 14, 1869 – April 17,1873
- Preceded by: Alexander Cameron Hunt
- Succeeded by: Samuel Hitt Elbert

2nd United States Minister to Hawaii
- In office July 26, 1866 – December 5, 1868
- President: Andrew Johnson
- Preceded by: James McBride
- Succeeded by: Henry A. Peirce

Personal details
- Born: June 15, 1833 Steubenville, Ohio, U.S.
- Died: September 9, 1909 (aged 76) Chicago, Illinois, U.S.
- Resting place: Union Cemetery-Beatty Park, Steubenville, Ohio
- Spouse: Mary McKenna McCook (m.1883)
- Children: 3

Military service
- Allegiance: United States of America; Union
- Branch/service: United States Army; Union Army
- Years of service: 1861–1866
- Rank: Brigadier General; Brevet Major General
- Commands: 2nd Indiana Cavalry; Cav Brigade / II Corps; Division / (Western) Cavalry Corps
- Battles/wars: American Civil War

Edward Moody McCook (June 15, 1833 – September 9, 1909) was an American lawyer, politician, distinguished Union cavalry general in the American Civil War, diplomat, and governor of the Territory of Colorado. He was a member of the famed "Fighting McCook" family of Ohio. Four of his brothers and 10 of his first cousins served as officers, with six of the family members becoming generals before the end of the war.

== Early life and career ==
McCook was born in Steubenville, Ohio, on June 15, 1833. As a young man, he moved to the Kansas Territory and became a lawyer. He joined the Pike's Peak Gold Rush in 1859 and represented the Pikes Peak region in the Kansas Territorial House of Representatives.

== Civil War ==
With the onset of the Civil War in 1861, McCook traveled to Washington, D.C., and served as a secret agent for the federal government, gathering information of value to the military. He then enlisted as a cavalry lieutenant in the regular army. He then joined the volunteer army as a captain in the 2nd Indiana Cavalry, rising to the rank of colonel by the middle of 1862. McCook commanded a cavalry brigade at the Battle of Perryville and a division at Chickamauga.

On April 27, 1864, he was promoted to brigadier general of volunteers and given command of the First Cavalry Division in the Army of the Cumberland. His 3,600 cavalrymen raided and severed the Macon & Western Railroad in late July 1864 while serving under George Stoneman during the Atlanta campaign. One of his goals was to release the 32,000 prisoners of war being held in the Andersonville Prison. However, as they tried to return to the main army on July 30, McCook was thoroughly defeated by Confederate cavalry under Joseph Wheeler at the Battle of Brown's Mill near Newnan, Georgia, losing 950 men, 1,200 horses and two pieces of artillery.

During Stoneman's raid, McCook gained a reputation for condoning and encouraging the destruction of civilian property. McCook and his remaining cavalry marched to Tennessee to assist George H. Thomas's efforts to stymie the Confederates under John Bell Hood. He served with distinction in the Franklin-Nashville Campaign.

In March and April 1865, as the war near its close, McCook commanded the First Division in Wilson's Raid through Alabama and Georgia, as well as at the Battle of Selma, where the federal cavalry dealt a crushing defeat upon Nathan Bedford Forrest. In early May, McCook's division was assigned to re-establish federal control and authority in Florida, whose ardent secessionist governor, John Milton, had shot himself in the head rather than submit to Union occupation.

On May 13, Col. George Washington Scott surrendered the last active Confederate troops in the state to McCook. On May 20, McCook read Abraham Lincoln’s Emancipation Proclamation during a ceremony in Tallahassee, officially ending slavery in Florida. That same day, his jubilant troopers raised the U.S. flag over the state capitol.

McCook reached the rank of brevet major general in the volunteers by the end of the war, and received the official praise of his superior, James H. Wilson. While not a professionally trained soldier, McCook was efficient and brave. He received a total of five brevet promotions in the Civil War, all for gallantry and meritorious service.

== Postbellum career ==
He returned to the regular army when his volunteers were mustered out following the war. In 1866, McCook resigned from the army and returned to civilian life. President Andrew Johnson appointed McCook to serve as the U.S. Minister to the Kingdom of Hawaii from 1866 through 1868. In 1869, President Ulysses S. Grant appointed McCook Governor of the Territory of Colorado, a selection bitterly opposed by Jerome B. Chaffee, the Colorado Territorial Delegate to the United States House of Representatives. During his tenure, Governor McCook signed the legislation that created Colorado Agricultural College (now Colorado State University) and was among the first territorial governors to endorse women's suffrage. He was a member of the Republican National Committee in 1872.

McCook left the governorship when his second term expired in 1875 and turned to various business pursuits. He became very wealthy from numerous shrewd investments in real estate, mining interests and in new European telephone companies. For a time, he paid more income and business taxes than any man in Colorado.

McCook died in Chicago, Illinois, and is buried in Union Cemetery in Steubenville. The city of McCook, Nebraska, was named in honor of his cousin Alexander McDowell McCook.

== See also ==
- List of American Civil War generals (Union)
- History of Colorado
- List of governors of Colorado
- Territory of Colorado

== Notes ==
Diplomatic posts
Preceded by James McBride	United States Minister to Hawaii; Mar 21, 1866 – December 5, 1868	Succeeded by Henry A. Peirce
