= 1894 Constitution of the Republic of Hawaii =

The 1894 Constitution of the Republic of Hawaii was the fundamental law of the short-lived Republic of Hawaii before it was annexed by the United States. It was promulgated by a constitutional convention of 35 members: 19 from the Executive and Advisory Councils of the Provisional Government of Hawaii and 18 delegates elected by those who were eligible to do so. While based on the American system of government, there were several notable changes.

== Preparations for the constitutional convention ==
When it was obvious that annexation to the United States would not be immediate, the Provisional Government decided to end their temporary form of government and establish a more permanent system of government. A resolution to elect a constitutional convention to draft a permanent constitution passed the Provisional Government on February 15, 1894, who appointed a committee to draft a law for it. That committee came back with a draft on March 8, which was passed into law a week later on March 15.

The election was set for May 2, 1894. The method of election was changed from those of previous ones in Hawaii: each voter had as many votes as delegates his district were to choose, and could split them however they wish. Voters were required to be male and at least twenty years old, to have lived in Hawaii for at least a year and be a registered voter, to swear allegiance to the Provisional Government, to be "of Hawaiian, American or European birth or descent", and to have paid their taxes for 1893. Those who had not paid their taxes or resided in Hawaii for the required time could still vote, though, if they could prove they were soldiers, militiamen, or policemen on January 1, 1894.

Some supporters of the Provisional Government, not to mention supporters of the Kingdom of Hawaii, opposed the allocation of delegates since it ensured members of the government would always have a majority. That opposition did not prompt any changes in the apportionment of delegates. Clubs supportive of annexation combined to form an American Union Party, which requested government endorsement but was denied as in their view it would be "impolitic". The government also encouraged Native Hawaiians to register, and asked Albert S. Willis, the ambassador of the United States to Hawaii, to issue a statement that the monarchy was over; he refused because he stated he did not have the authority to do so. Portuguese on the islands were also enticed to vote by the promise that the oath to the Provisional Government would not affect their status as Portuguese citizens. In April 1894 the Provisional Government began to prepare a draft for the convention to consider when writing the final document. Eight to twelve people from Honolulu advised them, and Lorrin A. Thurston, Hawaiian minister to the US at the time, also sent in his thoughts on the matter. They also received many proposals from the United States, but discarded most of them because they did not consider them "in line with existing circumstances".

There was some competition, but no organized opposition parties, in the election. Against the wishes of the administration that government officials not be nominated, a judge was nominated in a Honolulu district, while another campaigned for the constitution to be ratified by popular vote, not just by the convention. A little more than four thousand people were reported to be registered, less than half the number of those registered for the preceding one. On the day of the election, 2,904 people voted, about three-quarters of those registered and 2.9 percent of the whole population of the islands. While people from many countries with many political views were elected, none were opposed to annexation.

== The convention ==
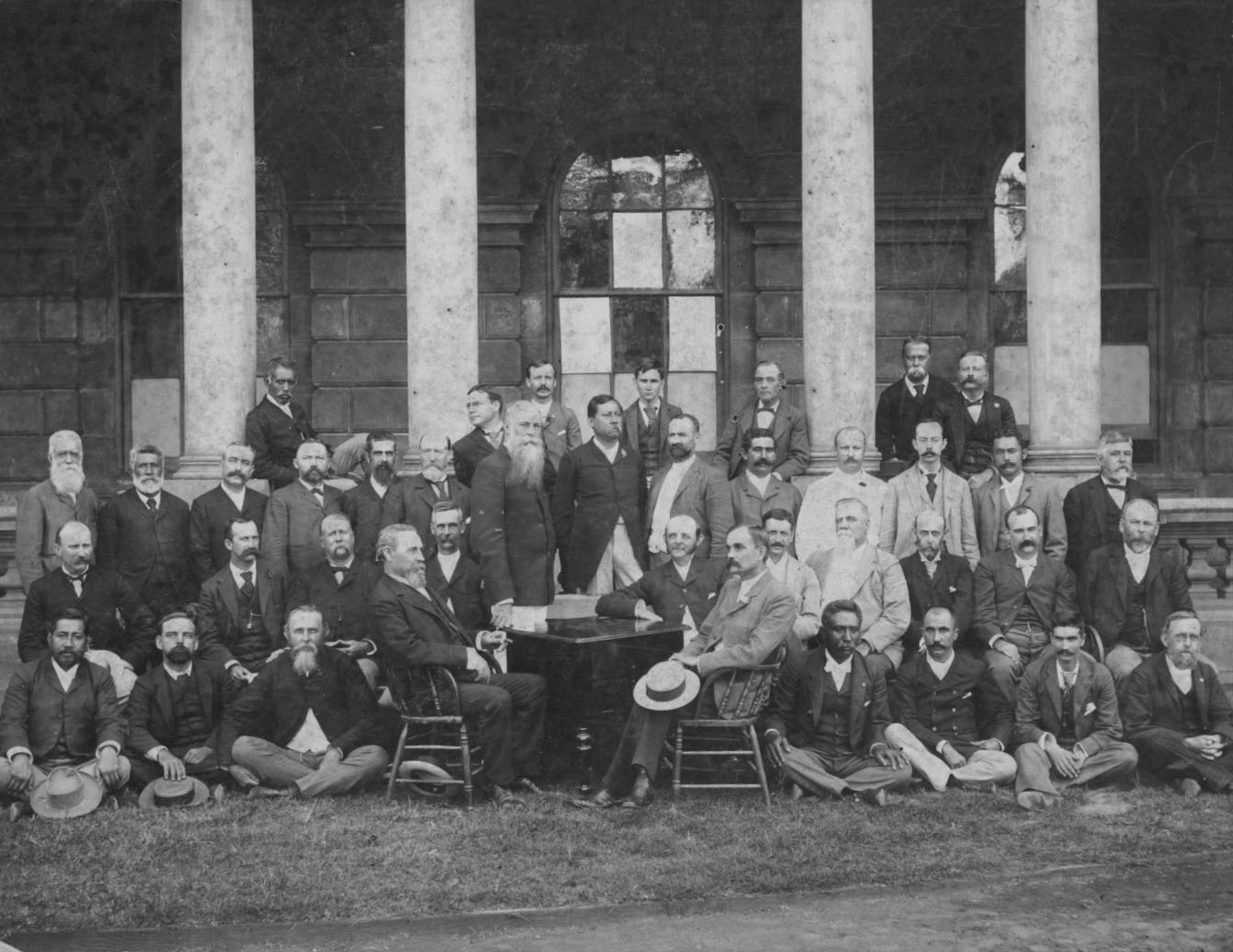
The convention

The convention opened at 11 AM on May 30, 1894, at the legislative hall in the Judiciary Building. President Sanford B. Dole gave the opening address, in which he declared that the monarchy had come to its end by attempting to deprive the people of their rights. He also reminded the delegates that they had a "difficult and delicate...duty...to perform.", as the people of Hawaii came from many countries and were "without a common origin, religion or purpose". He stated voting was a duty, not a right, which only intelligent people could perform well, and recommended that only people who owned a certain amount of property should be allowed to vote, as in his view this would reflect intelligence.

After settling a dispute over whether one of its members had been lawfully elected, the Convention decided upon how it was to approve the constitution: there would be two readings, in each of which the constitution would be considered article by article. Later a third reading was added "for purposes of revision only." The first thirteen articles, relating to the rights of the people, were mostly passed by unanimous consent, but a clause banning advocacy for restoring the monarchy, violently overthrowing the government, or invading the country, was shot down and replaced by a clause banning "the publication or public utterance of seditious or indecent language". A section allowing the government to make laws for the "registration, supervision, control and identification of all persons or of any class or nationality of persons" was placed in the very first article. At the second reading it was decided that the government should have the right to appeal acquittals in criminal cases, but later it was repealed.

The question of who could vote and be a citizen hung over the convention. The draft allowed people who had lived in Hawaii for a year, spoke English, come from a country "with express treaty stipulations with the Republic of Hawaii concerning naturalization", had a way to support themselves, owned $200, and swore an oath of loyalty to the Republic of Hawaii to be naturalized. After much debate between those who favored one and three years of residence in Hawaii to qualify for citizenship, a compromise at two years of residence was carried by one vote. The requirement for the naturalized person to come from a nation with treaty relations with the Republic of Hawaii led the Chinese population of the islands, whose government did not have a treaty with Hawaii, to petition the convention twice requesting equal rights, as well as the Japanese consul on Hawaii to demand equal rights of suffrage for his people, but the convention did not amend this clause. In fact, there were no countries in the world who had signed a naturalization treaty with Hawaii, but the problem was solved with the mechanism of "denization".
