= Independent Hawaii =

Independent Hawaii refers to the three consecutive periods of history when the Hawaiian Islands were politically unified and nominally independent:

- the Hawaiian Kingdom, which existed from 1795 to January 17, 1893;
- the Provisional Government of Hawaii, which existed from January 17, 1893 to July 4, 1894; and
- the Republic of Hawaii, which existed from July 4, 1894 until August 12, 1898, when the Republic was annexed by the United States and Hawaii became a U.S. territory.

== See also ==
- Hawaiian sovereignty movement
