= Henry E. Cooper =

American and Hawaii politician (1857–1929)

Henry Ernest Cooper
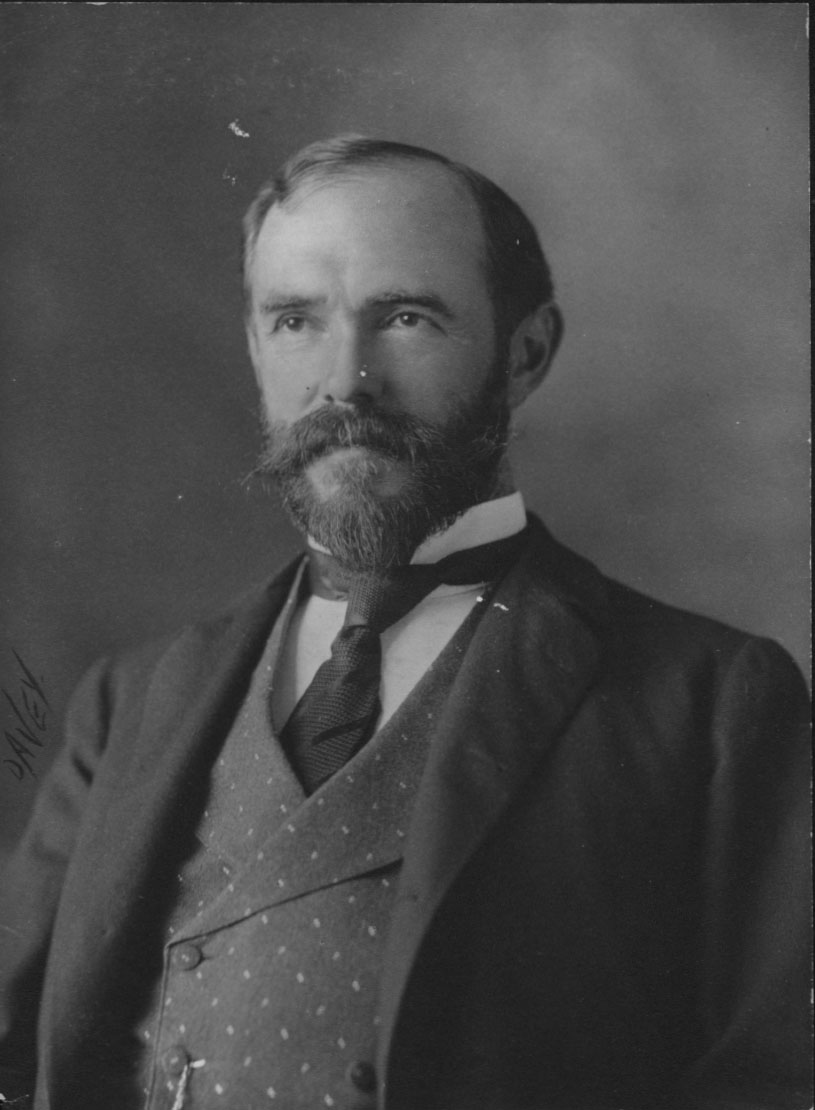

Republic of Hawaii Minister of Foreign Affairs
- In office November 6, 1895 – March 29, 1899
- President: Sanford B. Dole

Personal details
- Born: August 28, 1857 New Albany, Indiana
- Died: May 15, 1929 (aged 71) Long Beach, California
- Spouse: Mary Ellen Porter
- Children: 7
- Occupation: Lawyer, judge, politician
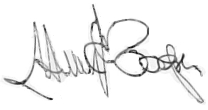
- Signature

Henry Ernest Cooper (August 28, 1857 – May 15, 1929) was an American lawyer who moved to the Kingdom of Hawaii and became prominent in Hawaiian politics in the 1890s. He formally deposed Queen Lili'uokalani of Hawaii in 1893, held various offices in the ensuing Provisional Government of Hawaii and Republic of Hawaii governments, and was the first United States Territory of Hawaii Attorney General, 1899–1900. He later became a circuit judge in Honolulu.

== Early life ==
Cooper was born August 28, 1857, in New Albany, Indiana, to Harriet Augusta Cooper and William Giles Cooper, a lawyer from England. He was educated in public schools in Boston and received the LLB degree from the Boston University School of Law in 1878. He was admitted to the bar in Suffolk County, Massachusetts and practiced law there.

Cooper married Mary Ellen Porter October 2, 1883, in San Diego, California. In 1884 he named his estate Bonita Ranch, and the name was applied to the post office of Bonita, California. There the Coopers had five children: Alfred Dykes Cooper (born 6/8/1886), Henry Ernest Cooper Jr. (born July 1887), Wallace McKay Cooper (August 1888 – April 1, 1966), Theodore Augustus Cooper (born October 28, 1889), and Alice Cooper (December 9, 1890 – 1978). He worked as an attorney for the California Southern Railroad, including arguing several cases in the Supreme Court of California.

Cooper moved with his family to the Hawaiian Islands in 1890, where they had three more children: Ysabel Cooper, and twin Irene, (born February 19, 1894), and Francis Judd Cooper (born April 6, 1895). They settled in the Mānoa Valley near Honolulu where Cooper Road is named for him at 21°18′39″N 157°48′55″W.

== Politics ==
In Hawaii, Cooper quickly got involved in Hawaiian politics during a very turbulent decade, with several changes of government.

On January 14, 1893, he was chairman of the Citizens' Committee of Safety which organized the overthrow of the Kingdom of Hawaii. On January 16 his name was the first on a letter to John L. Stevens, the United States Minister to Hawaii, saying "...the public safety is menaced and lives and property are in peril, and we appeal to you and the United States forces at your command for assistance." On January 17, before a crowd in front of 'Iolani Palace, he read the proclamation deposing Queen Lili'uokalani and establishing the provisional Government of Hawaii, and the next day was made a member of the advisory council to President Sanford B. Dole.

From March 7, 1893, to November 4, 1895, he was judge of the first circuit court. Beginning on November 6, 1895, he served as Minister of Foreign Affairs of what was then the Republic of Hawaii through March 29, 1899. He acted temporarily in all other posts of Dole's cabinet as the other members traveled to negotiate with the United States on annexation. These included Attorney General from November 6, 1895, to December 12, 1895, and from February 10, 1897, to April 16, 1897; Minister of Finance from May 5, 1896, to August 10, 1897; and Minister of the Interior from March 4, 1898, to July 1, 1898. He was also appointed to the Board of Health on February 12, 1897, later becoming president of the board until 1900.

From January 11, 1898, to March 3, 1898, Cooper was the acting president of the republic. From March 20, 1899, to June 14, 1900, he was attorney general of the new Territory of Hawaii. Under the Hawaiian Organic Act, on June 14, 1900, President William McKinley appointed him to be the first secretary of the territory, and also as treasurer of the territory. He was acting governor from March 31, 1902, to June 3, 1902. A few days after resigning the treasurer post December 2, 1902, he became superintendent of public works from December 6, 1902, to November 18, 1903.

This prompted some in the press to call him the real power in the territory, accusing him of taking the public works position because he could make more money. A local newspaper said:

Some men are born great, some achieve greatness, but it is only rarely that an ordinary cooper is enabled to thrust such constantly growing greatness upon himself as does this Territorial Cooper of ours.

On January 1, 1903, he sent congratulatory messages over the first submarine communications cable from San Francisco to Hawaii. Recipients included US President Theodore Roosevelt and Clarence Mackay, president of the Commercial Pacific Cable Company.

An investigation in 1903 noted that most public works projects had ceased because of lack of funds, but government crews repaved the sidewalks in front of his house. Another scandal involved the new treasurer William H. Wright, who was allowed to escape after he was found to have been pocketing government money with checks endorsed by Cooper. On February 23, 1903, he resigned as territorial secretary, and November 18 as superintendent of public works, after George R. Carter became governor. Carter expressed suspicion that public land deals were being rushed through, with possible conflict of interest by Cooper.

He formed a law firm Kinney, McClanahan & Cooper (with partners William Ansel Kinney and E. B. McClanahan), and often worked for owners of large Sugar plantations in Hawaii. The plantations often leased government land, and concentrated political and economic power in a few of what were called the "Big Five" of Hawaii. At least one of their cases, "Territory of Hawaii vs. Cotton Brothers & Company" of 1904 went to the United States Supreme Court. On March 22, 1910, he was named again to be judge of the first circuit court, and served until March 7, 1914.

== Personal life and legacy ==
Cooper and the tallest Pisonia grandis tree at Palmyra in 1913

Cooper purchased the Palmyra Atoll, located almost 1,000 miles Southwest of Hawaii at 5°53′15″N 162°4′52″W, a 2/3 share in 1911 and the rest, excepting small interests of some native Hawaiians, in 1912. In Hawaii Land Court, he petitioned for total ownership of Palmyra, but the court preserved some of the Hawaiians' interests, over his objections. He visited the island in July 1913 with scientists Charles Montague Cooke Jr. and Joseph F. Rock who wrote a description of the atoll. He sold most of the atoll in 1922 to the Fullard-Leo family, who sold it to the Nature Conservancy in 2000. He retained ownership of the Home Islands at the southwestern tip of the atoll, and they are co-owned today by dozens of his descendants and others. His land title, passed to the Fullard-Leos and his own legatees, was confirmed by the U. S. Supreme Court in U.S. v. Fullard-Leo, 331 U.S. 256 (1947) after it was disputed by the U. S. military. The largest island of the group is called Cooper Island, despite a proposed name change to Samarang Island in 2003. The airstrip built in World War II is often called Cooper Airport.

In his later years he was active in Freemasonry. In 1894 he joined Hawaiian Lodge No. 21, and organized Pacific Lodge No. 822, A.F. & A.M. under the Grand Lodge of Scotland through the then District Grand Lodge of Queensland, Australia. He served as its first Master in 1895 and again in 1896. Cooper also served as Deputy of the Orient of Hawaii for the Scottish Rite Bodies from 1896 to 1915. In 1897 he commissioned architect Charles William Dickey to build a stone house on his Mānoa land in California Mission Revival Style architecture. On May 1, 1907, he became a founding member and president of the board of regents of the University of Hawaiʻi (then known as Hawaii College), and served until 1914. He selected the site in the Mānoa valley for the main campus, the University of Hawaiʻi at Mānoa.

He moved to Long Beach, California, to live with a daughter, where he died on May 15, 1929. Son Theodore graduated from Oahu College in 1908, and became an engineer constructing Fort Ruger in Honolulu. After working briefly for Bank of Hawaii, he enlisted to the United States Army Corps of Engineers and served in France during World War I. Son Alfred D. Cooper was a sugar planter in the Philippines, imprisoned by the Japanese in the Santo Tomas Internment Camp in World War II.

Daughter Alice Cooper Bailey wrote several articles and books including two Dutch folk stories and a popular Hawaiian children's book Kimo in 1928. It ends with a climactic audience before a kindly Queen Liliʻuokalani of Hawaii (whom Bailey's father had in fact personally deposed and overthrown). She wrote a biography of Robert Louis Stevenson in 1966. She was part of a ceremony in 1948 marking the 50th anniversary of Hawaii's annexation, and was a benefactor of the ʻIolani Palace in Honolulu where Cooper had worked during the Republic of Hawaii period. His grandson Richard Briggs Bailey headed the world's first mutual fund, the Massachusetts Investors Trust fund. Twin daughters Irene and Ysabel married future U.S. Vice Admirals Olaf Mandt Hustvedt and James Pine.

Several of Cooper's descendants have had distinguished naval and nautical careers, including Space Shuttle naval astronaut Rick Hauck and Capt. Erling H. Hustvedt. On August 19, 1922, a grandson Henry Ernest Cooper III was born in Bridgeport, Connecticut, to Wallace McKay Cooper. Henry III served in the US Navy in World War II aboard the USS Card. In 1987 he sailed with a few friends from Maine through the Pacific Ocean, including a visit, together with another grandson, nautical artist Stephen R. Hustvedt, to their inherited Home Islands at Palmyra Atoll. Henry III died in 1999 and Stephen in 2005.

Government offices
Preceded by Francis March Hatch	Republic of Hawaii Minister of Foreign Affairs; 1895–1899	Succeeded by Ernest Mott-Smith
Preceded by William Owen Smith	Acting Republic of Hawaii Attorney General; November 6, 1895 – December 12, 1895; February 10, 1897 – April 16, 1897	Succeeded by William Owen Smith
Preceded by James A. King	Acting Republic of Hawaii Minister of Finance; June 30, 1896 – September 12, 1896; September 5, 1899 – November 13, 1899	Succeeded by Theodore F. Lansing
Preceded by James A. King	Acting Republic of Hawaii Minister of the Interior; March 4, 1898 – July 1, 1898	Succeeded by James A. King
Preceded by First	Territory of Hawaii Attorney General; March 20, 1899 – June 14, 1900	Succeeded by Edmund P. Dole
