= Black Week (disambiguation) =

Black Week can be:

- Black Week during the Boer War
- Black Week (Hawaii)
- Black Friday (shopping)
- July Crisis, the crisis leading up to World War I
