= Edmund Pearson Dole =

American lawyer

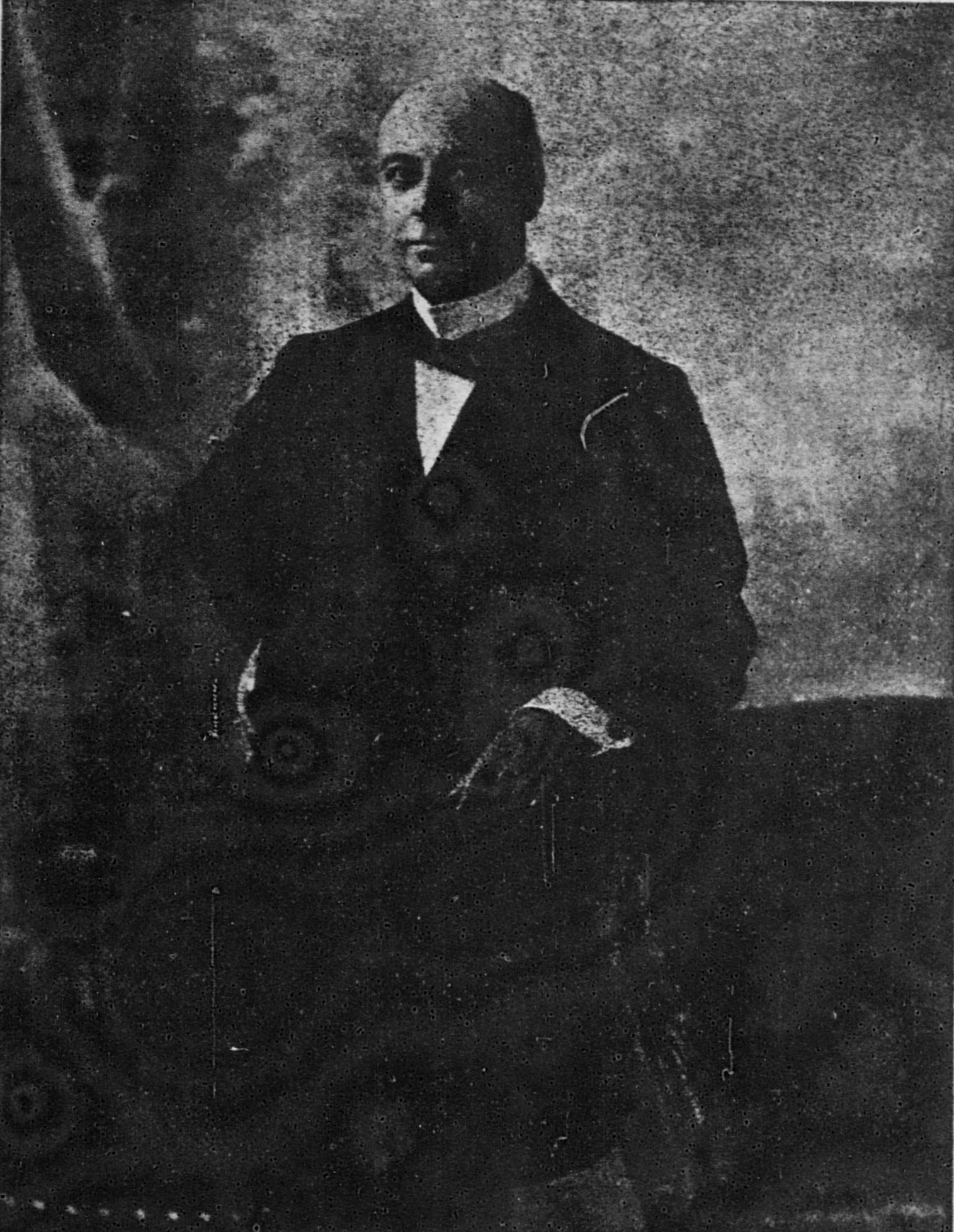

Attorney General of Hawaii
- In office June 14, 1900 – February 1, 1903
- Governor: Sanford B. Dole
- Preceded by: Henry Ernest Cooper

Personal details
- Born: February 28, 1850 Skowhegan, Maine
- Died: December 31, 1928 (aged 78) Keene, New Hampshire
- Spouse: Eleanor Gallagher
- Occupation: Lawyer

Edmund Pearson Dole (February 28, 1850 – December 31, 1928) was a lawyer from New England who served as the first Attorney General of the Territory of Hawaii, and argued a case up to the U.S. Supreme Court. He also wrote several novels.

== Life ==
Edmund Pearson Dole was born February 28, 1850, in Skowhegan, Maine. His father was classical language teacher Isiah Dole (1819–1892), and his mother was Elizabeth Todd Pearson (died 1851). Dole graduated from Wesleyan University in Middletown, Connecticut, in 1874. He married Gertrude Ellen Davenport in 1878. He studied law under Charles Robinson Jr., graduated from law school at Boston University, and was admitted to the bar at Suffolk County, Massachusetts. He practiced as a law partner of Farnum Fish Lane in Keene, New Hampshire. He served as Cheshire County Solicitor in 1880 and 1881, similar to a modern District Attorney. He wrote a book trying to explain the law profession to the public in 1887. He then moved to Seattle in 1890. In 1891 he was offered the position of dean of a new law school in Spokane.

His cousin Sanford Ballard Dole had become president of the Republic of Hawaii and wrote to him for help. By June 1895 he was practicing law in Honolulu, and acting as assistant to Henry Ernest Cooper as Attorney General of Hawaii.

Dole published a novel The Stand-By in 1897 with a hero who promoted Prohibition but was in love with the daughter of a brewer. It received praise from the Honolulu press:

Its woof of romance richly colored with incident and episode is struck into a warp of informing fact relative to one of the leading questions of the age.

The New York Times, however, saw a more political message:

...as Mr Edmund P. Dole would have it, or as it seems to be written within the lines, the Republicans are the only lawabiding people on God's earth, the only virtuous, self-respecting souls, and the Democrats—quite the opposite. There is a tinge of fanaticism, then, in Mr. Dole's Romance.

Dole replaced Cooper as attorney general on June 14, 1900. He also published his second novel Hiwa: a tale of ancient Hawaii in 1900.

Dole married Eleanor Gallagher, daughter of Bernard Gallagher of San Francisco, on September 5, 1901, and they divorced in 1902. His ex-wife then became a singer in New York City.

He resigned as attorney general on February 1, 1903, to argue a case in the U.S. Supreme Court at the request of Philander C. Knox who was US Attorney General. Federal District Court Judge Morris M. Estee had overturned the conviction of Osaki Mankichi because he was never indicted by a grand jury, and was convicted by a simple majority of a jury instead of unanimously. Estee ruled the court proceeding denied the accused rights guaranteed by the United States Constitution. The case had the implication of invalidating many legal procedures during the time between July 1898 when the Newlands Resolution annexed Hawaii by the United States, and April 1900 when the Hawaiian Organic Act established a territorial government. The Supreme Court voted 5 to 4 that the continued operation of the Republic of Hawaii legal system was valid during the transition period. Dole lived in Washington, D.C., for two years, then moved back to Seattle and practiced law again there. He died December 31, 1928, in Keene.

== Works ==
- Edmund Pearson Dole (1887). Talks about law: a popular statement of what our law is and how it is administered. Houghton, Mifflin and Company.
- Edmund Pearson Dole (1897). The stand-by. The Century Company. ISBN 978-1-103-94299-2.
- Edmund Pearson Dole (1900). Hiwa: a tale of ancient Hawaii. Harper. ISBN 978-0-554-41369-3.
- Edmund Pearson Dole; Osaki Mankichi; Hawaii. Office of the Attorney General; United States. Supreme Court, United States. District Court (Hawaii) (1901). In the Supreme Court of the United States: In the matter of the application of Osaki Mankichi for a writ of habeas corpus. Appeal of the Territory of Hawaii from the District court of the United States in and for said territory. Hawaiian Gazette Printing Company. Brief for appellant

Government offices
Preceded by Henry Ernest Cooper	Territory of Hawaii Attorney General; 1900–1903	Succeeded by Lorrin Andrews
