= Black Week (Hawaii) =

- Part of Hawaiian rebellions (1887–1895)
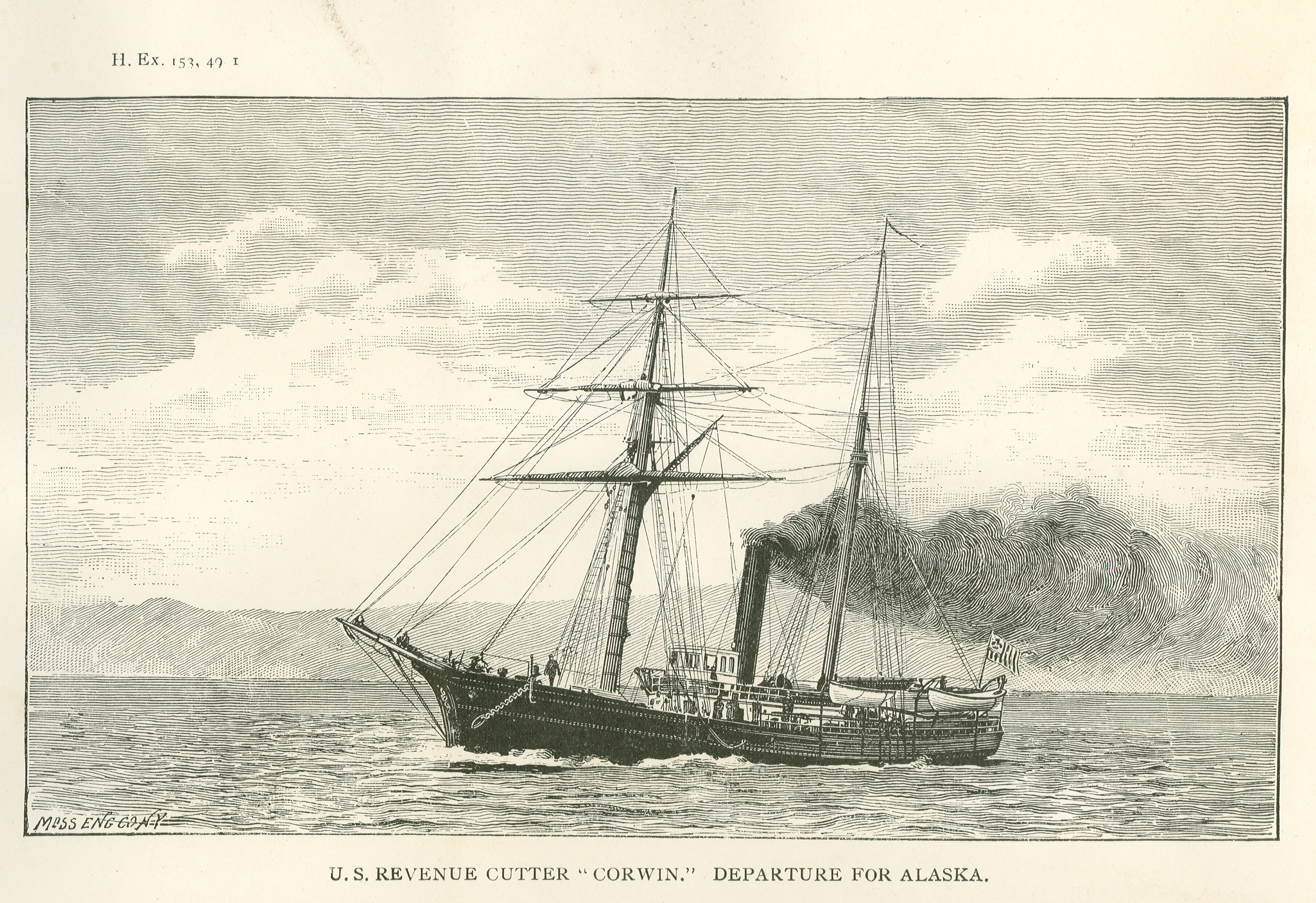
- USRC Thomas Corwin, whose unexpected arrival caused the incident
Date	December 14, 1893 – January 11, 1894
Location	Honolulu, Hawaii 21°18′25″N 157°51′30″W
Result	United States political victory: Provisional Government of Hawaii succeeded by the Republic of Hawaii; Annexation of Hawaii postponed

Belligerents
United States; United Kingdom	Provisional Government of Hawaii

Commanders and leaders
(United States) Albert S. Willis (United States) John Irwin	(Hawaii) Sanford B. Dole

Strength
United States: 1 Screw sloop; 1 Cruiser; United Kingdom: 1 Screw corvette	

The Black Week was a crisis in Honolulu, Hawaii that nearly caused a war between the Hawaiian Provisional Government and the United States.

== Background ==
In the wake of the overthrow of the Hawaiian Kingdom, President Grover Cleveland of the United States denounced the coup d'état and vowed to reverse the damage done, and to restore the Kingdom. Following the overthrow, Cleveland launched an investigation headed by James Blount (as then United States Minister to Hawaii), known as the Blount Report. After the investigation, the minister to Hawaii was replaced by Albert Willis, who began negotiations with the deposed monarch, Queen Liliʻuokalani, for a US led invasion to restore the monarchy. However, the negotiations fell through due to President Cleveland's unwillingness to use force against the Provisional Government.

== Crisis ==
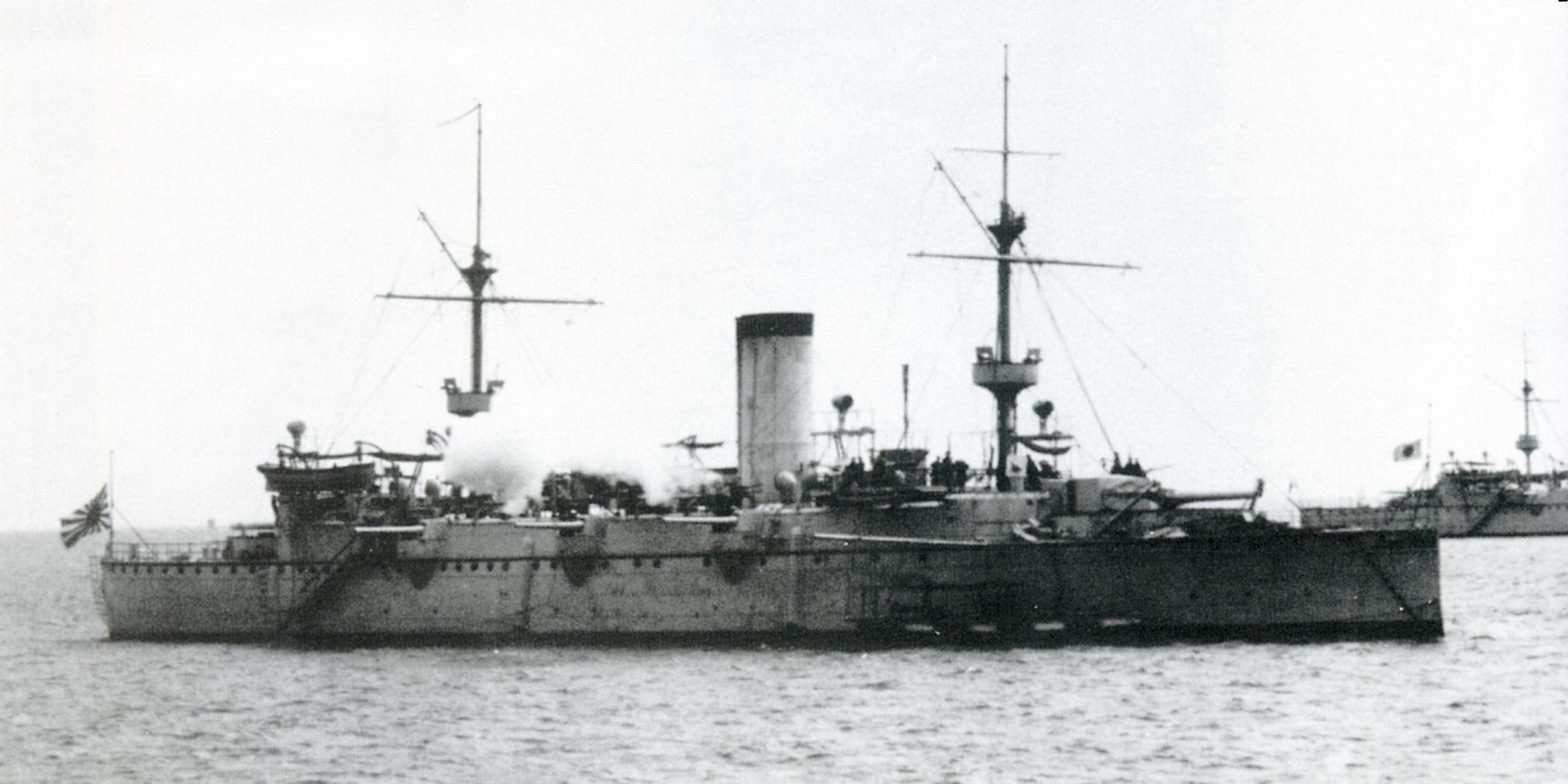
Cruiser Naniwa

On December 14, 1893, Albert Willis arrived in Honolulu aboard the USRC Corwin unannounced, this caused anticipation of an American invasion to restore the monarchy. During this hysteria, Willis stimulated fears by staging a mock invasion with the USRC Corwin, USS Adams, and USS Philadelphia, directing their guns toward the capital. Willis' goal was to maintain fear of the United States to pressure the Provisional Government into forfeiting the island back to the Queen and to maintain a US invasion as a possibility, whilst remaining officially neutral. Willis stated there were more than 1,000 men of military age in the city that the Provisional Government was arming. Willis ordered Rear Admiral John Irwin to organize a landing operation using troops on the two American ships. He made no attempt to conceal preparations of the operation, as men readied equipment on deck. The next shipment of mail, news, and information was yet to arrive aboard the Alameda, so until then the public was uninformed of the relations between Hawaii and the US. Sanford B. Dole, The President of the provisional government of Hawaii attempted to quell the anxiety by assuring the public there would be no invasion. On January 3, 1894 public anxiety became critical, giving the incident its name, the "Black Week". As the anticipation of a conflict intensified in Honolulu, Irwin became concerned for American citizens and property in the city, considering he may actually have to land troops to protect them if violence erupted in retaliation for the crisis. The commanders of the Japanese cruiser Naniwa and the British cruiser HMS Champion asked to join the landing operation, in order to protect lives and property of their respective nationalities. On January 11, 1894, Willis revealed to Dole the invasion to be a hoax.

== Aftermath ==
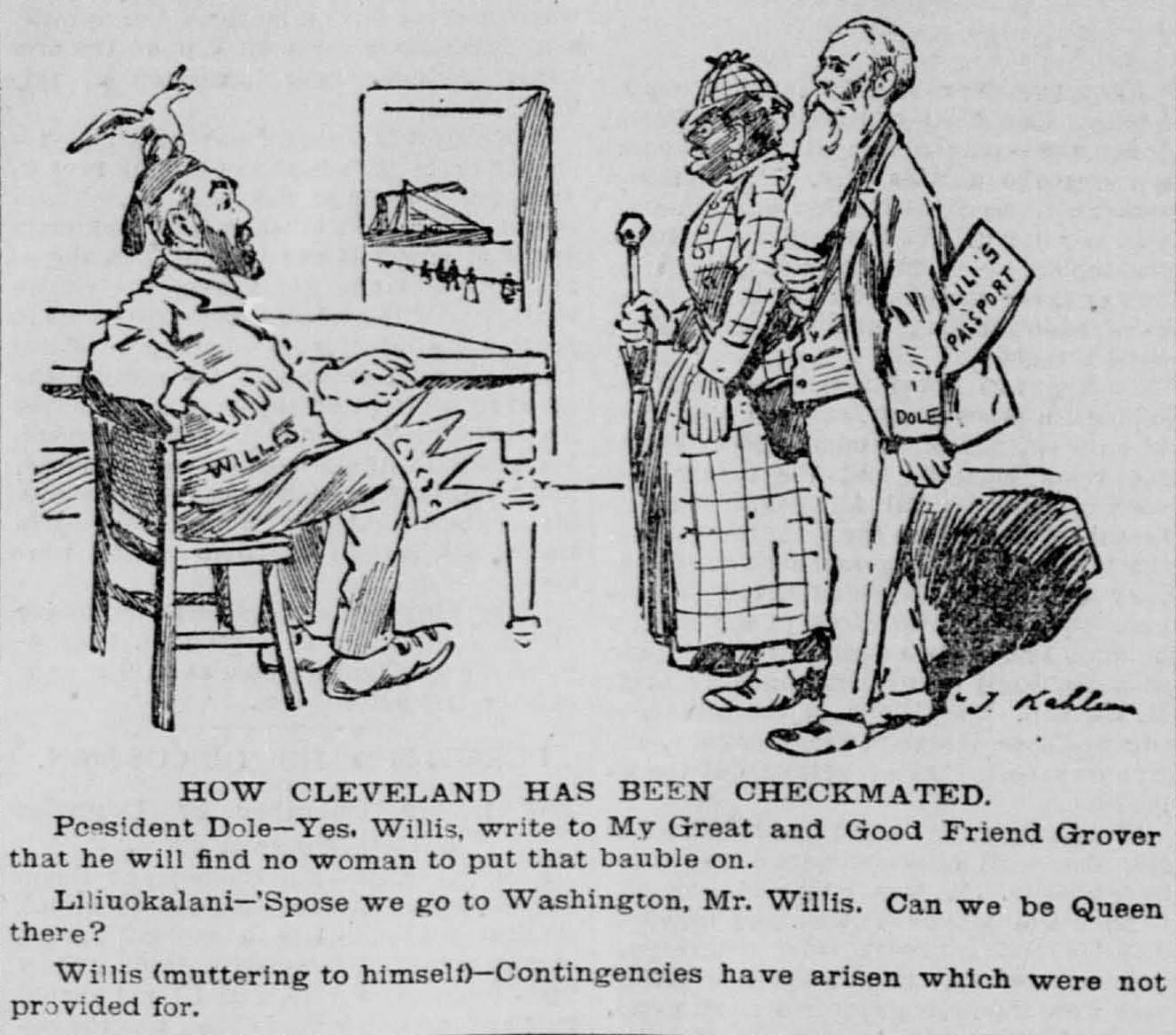
An 1893 editorial cartoon with Willis, Queen Liliʻuokalani, and President Sanford B. Dole by the newspaper The Morning Call

Though Willis did not restore the monarchy, he was able to incite doubt in the Hawaiian public over the Provisional Government and communicate that the US was capable of going to war with them. This was one of the factors resulting in the formation of a republic. To Cleveland, this was an improvement; avoiding annexation left the potential to restore the monarchy and was more favorable in keeping Hawaii an independent country than as a territory of the United States. Shortly afterward, on 4 July 1894, the Provisional Government renamed itself by declaring the Republic of Hawaii.

=== Domestic press responses ===
Domestic response to Willis' and Cleveland's efforts was largely negative. The independent New York Herald wrote: "If Minister Willis has not already been ordered to quit meddling in Hawaiian affairs and mind his own business, no time should be lost in giving him emphatic instructions to that effect." The Democratic New York World wrote: "Is it not high time to stop the business of interference with the domestic affairs of foreign nations? Hawaii is 2000 miles from our nearest coast. Let it alone." The Democratic New York Sun said: "Mr. Cleveland lacks ... the first essential qualification of a referee or arbitrator." The Republican New York Tribune called Willis' trip a "forlorn and humiliating failure to carry out Mr. Cleveland's outrageous project". The Republican New York Recorder wrote: "The idea of sending out a minister accredited to the President of a new republic, having him present his credentials to that President and address him as 'Great and Good Friend', and then deliberately set to work to organize a conspiracy to overthrow his Government and re-establish the authority of the deposed Queen, is repugnant to every man who holds American honor and justice in any sort of respect." The Democratic New York Times was one of the few New York City newspapers that defended Cleveland's decisions: "Mr. Willis discharged his duty as he understood it."
