= William Owen Smith =

American missionary (1848–1929)

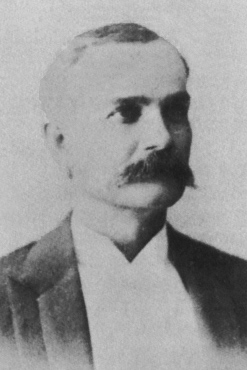

Republic of Hawaii Attorney General
- In office November 6, 1895 – March 20, 1899
- President: Sanford B. Dole
- Succeeded by: Henry E. Cooper

Personal details
- Born: August 4, 1848 Kōloa, Kauaʻi
- Died: April 13, 1929 (aged 80) Honolulu
- Spouse: Mary Abbey Hobron
- Occupation: Lawyer

William Owen Smith (August 4, 1848 – April 13, 1929) was a lawyer from a family of American missionaries who participated in the overthrow of the Kingdom of Hawaii. He was attorney general for the entire duration of the Provisional Government of Hawaii and the Republic of Hawaii.

== Life ==
Smith was born August 4, 1848, in Kōloa on the island of Kauaʻi. His parents were the physician James William Smith (1810–1887) and Melicent Knapp Smith (1816–1891), a teacher. His parents were in the tenth set of missionaries to Hawaii from the American Board of Commissioners for Foreign Missions who arrived in 1842. His sister Charlotte Elizabeth "Lottie" Smith (1845–1896) married Alfred Stedman Hartwell (1836–1912), who was a former general in the American Civil War, on January 10, 1872. His brother, Jared Knapp Smith (1849–1897), became a physician and carried on his father's medical practice. His sister, Melicent Lena Smith (1854–1943), married William Waterhouse (1852–1942). Waterhouse was mayor of Pasadena, California, 1904–1906.

He attended Daniel Dole's missionary school at Kōloa, Punahou School from 1863 to 1866, and then Massachusetts Agricultural College (now the University of Massachusetts Amherst). On his return, he worked as a clerk in his brother-in-law Hartwell's law office.

He was sheriff on Kauaʻi in 1870 and then Maui from 1872 to 1874. While working at the Lāhainā Courthouse, on April 24, 1873, he planted a banyan tree (Ficus benghalensis) to commemorate the 50th anniversary of the arrival of Christian missionaries on the island.

On March 23, 1876, he married Mary Abbey Hobron. They had five children: Clarence Hobron Smith, Ethel Frances Smith born November 17, 1879, Pauline Melicent Smith, Anna Katherine Smith, and Lorrin Knapp Smith. He founded the law firm of Smith, Thurston & Kinney with Lorrin A. Thurston and William Ansel Kinney in Honolulu in 1887.

== Politics ==
He acted as deputy attorney general, and was elected as a representative from Maui to the legislature of the Hawaiian Kingdom from 1878 to 1884. He helped draft the 1887 Constitution of the Kingdom of Hawaii, which King Kalākaua was forced to sign, giving it the name "Bayonet Constitution". His law partner Thurston then became minister in the new cabinet.

In the 1887 and 1888 sessions, he was elected to the upper House of Nobles.

In 1892, he was elected as representative from Kaua'i.

=== Overthrow ===
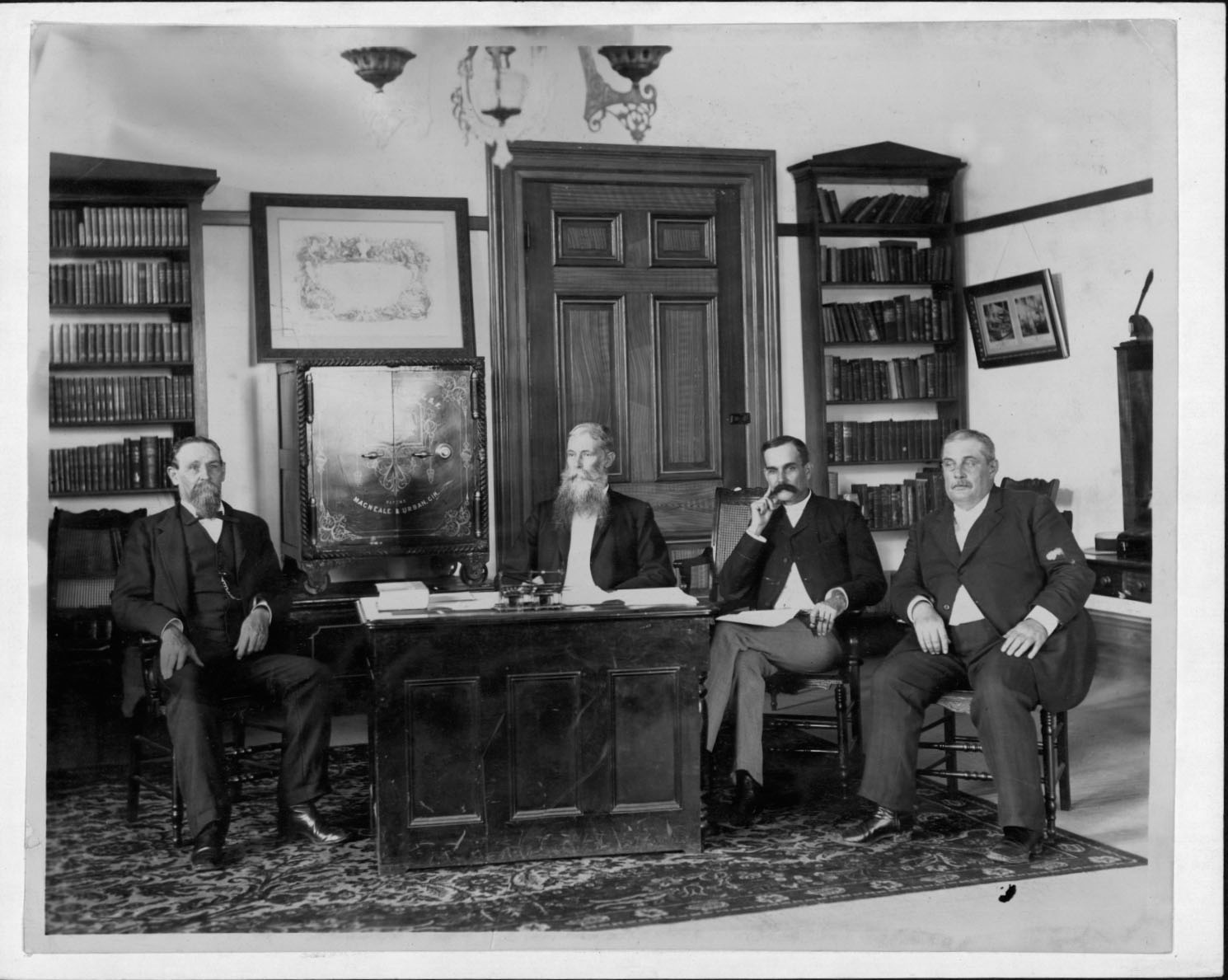
Provisional cabinet: (left to right) J. A. King, Dole, Smith, P. C. Jones

He was a member of the Committee of Safety that organized the overthrow of the Kingdom of Hawaii on January 14, 1893. On January 17, he was appointed to the executive council (the new cabinet) of the Provisional Government of Hawaii under president Sanford B. Dole, the son of his former teacher. Dole's stepmother, Charlotte Close Knapp (1813–1874), was the widow of Smith's uncle Horton Owen Knapp (1813–1845), who had been a missionary teacher himself on Kaua'i. Smith was Attorney General of Hawaii from the creation of Provisional Government through the Republic of Hawaii.

On December 18, 1895, he became a member of the board of health, and later its president. He had no formal training except for having a father and brother as practicing physicians.

=== Murder in the family ===
His brother Jared Knapp Smith was shot dead on September 24, 1897. It was suspected to be in retaliation for ordering patients suspected of leprosy to have tests that might send them to exile in Kalaupapa. Similar tensions had ignited the Leper War on Kaua'i four years earlier. His former law partner Kinney sailed to Kauaʻi island and was appointed special prosecutor. A native Hawaiian suspect, Kapea Kaʻahea, was arrested, tried on November 13, 1897, and found guilty of murder in the first degree.

Instead of waiting for next scheduled term of the circuit court, a special session had been called. Honolulu English-language newspapers said "there seems no doubt of the guilt of the chief prisoner" even before the trial. The objections brought to the Supreme Court of Hawaii were quickly rejected on February 3, 1898. Kapea was hanged on April 11, 1898. The rushed nature of the prosecution was thought to be an attempt to show the United States that the government was in firm control. Only a few months later, in July 1898, the Newlands Resolution annexed the islands. Of the four executions for capital punishment between 1889 and 1903 in Hawaii, all four were of non-whites within a four-month period.

=== Return to private practice ===
In August 1898, Smith offered to resign, but although now annexed, the old republic government continued to operate. On March 20, 1899, he was replaced as attorney general by Henry Ernest Cooper and returned to private practice. Smith was elected to one term of the Territory of Hawaii Senate from 1907 to 1909.

Smith was a trustee of the Kamehameha Schools, founded from the estate of Bernice Pauahi Bishop, from 1884 to 1886 and from 1897 to 1929. He was a trustee of the Lunalilo Estate, the Alexander Young Estate and the Honolulu Children's Hospital. He was on the board of the Guardian Trust Company, Bishop Trust Company, Inter-Island Steam Navigation Company and Alexander & Baldwin.

Despite his role in the overthrow, deposed Queen Liliʻuokalani selected him to be a founding trustee of her own estate when she made her will in December 1909. Her personal assets were left in a trust to benefit orphans.

On November 30, 1915, Prince Jonah Kūhiō Kalanianaʻole challenged the will in court, saying she was "of weakened mind" under the influence of the trustees. This was known as case 23 Haw. 457 in the Supreme Court of Hawaii. The feisty Queen demanded a public hearing of her sanity in February 1916. The firm, now Smith, Warren & Sutton, successfully defended Liliʻuokalani.

His law partners at the time were Louis J. Warren and Edwin White Sutton. Liliʻuokalani's charity still operates today.

== Legacy ==
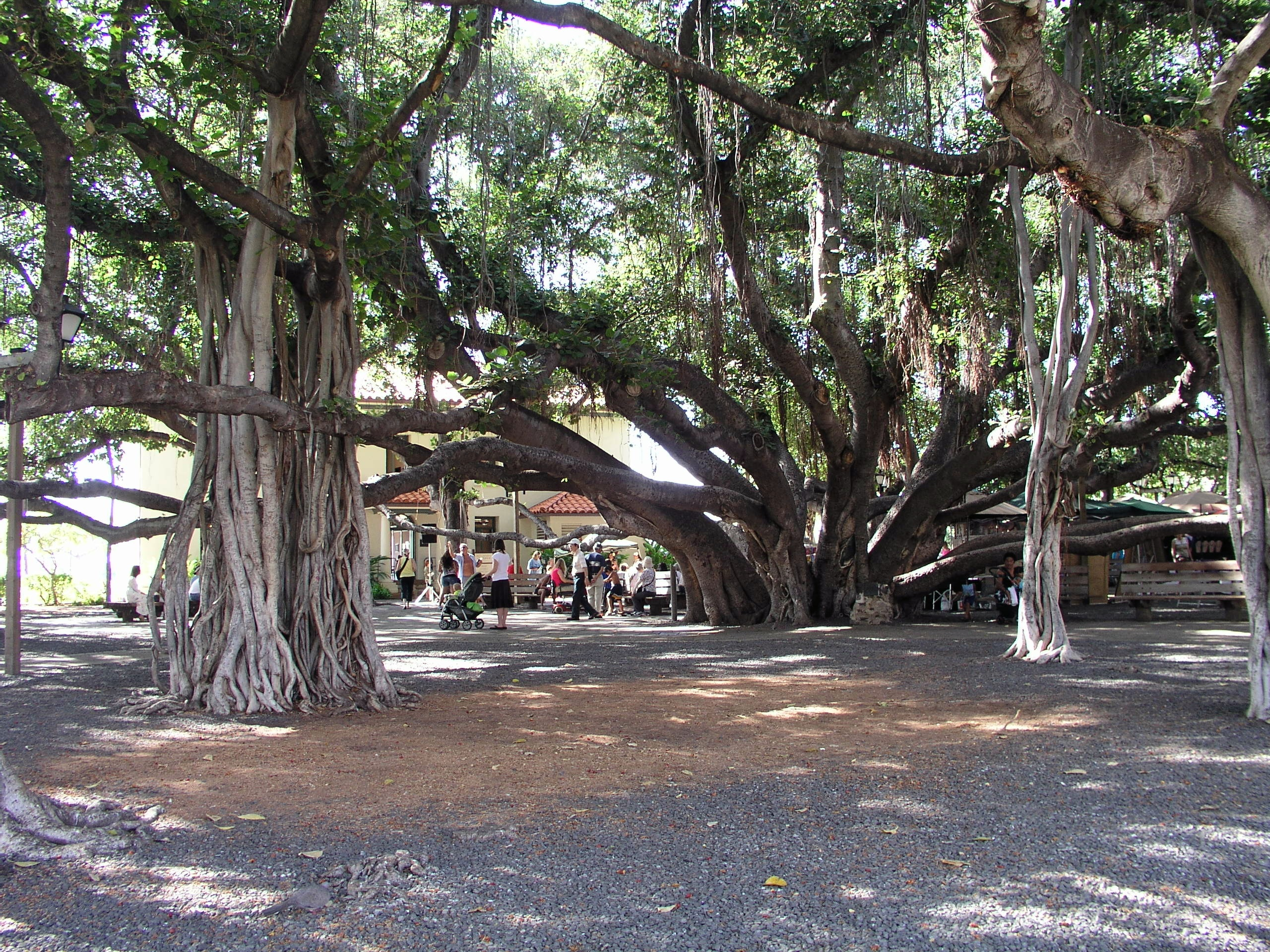
Banyan tree he planted in 1873 still stands in Lāhainā

His daughter, Ethel Frances Smith (1879–1967), married Henry Alexander Baldwin, known as "Harry" Baldwin who briefly became the congressional delegate for Hawaii.

His other daughter, Anna Katherine Smith (1888–1960), married Harry's brother Samuel Alexander Baldwin (1885–1950) and lived on Maui.

The father of his two sons-in-law was Henry Perrine Baldwin, founder of Alexander & Baldwin.

Clarence Hobron Smith married Margherita Adele Browning May 7, 1908, in New York. They then moved to Italy.

His youngest son, Lorrin Knapp Smith, was born October 10, 1890, married Sila Pratt (1890–1952), became a ranch manager on Maui, and died on October 27, 1930.

The Maui branches of the family are buried in the cemetery at Makawao Union Church.

His niece, Madeline Perry Hartwell, married Albert Francis Judd, Jr., son of Chief Justice of the Hawaii Supreme Court Albert Francis Judd on July 21, 1899.

His ties to the oligarchy known as the "Big Five" that dominated the island economy led the opposition press to call him "King Bill the First". They described him using a mix of stereotypes:

He was narrow-minded as a New Englander, domineering as a Russian Czar, yet suave as a Frenchman. He was obstinate as a Scotchman, generous as a Southerner, and at times vicious as an Indian. But he was withal the hardest working official we have ever heard of—next to the Devil.

In 1926, he was appointed to help organize the public archives of Hawaii. He donated many of his papers to the collection, including drafts of the 1887 constitution.

Smith died April 13, 1929, in his home in the Nuʻuanu Valley near Honolulu from pneumonia. After a number of partner changes, his law firm survives as Case Lombardi & Pettit.

Partner Daniel H. Case is the father of Steve Case and uncle of Congressman Ed Case.

Case was lawyer for Grove Farm, when it was bought by his son. It includes the area where Smith grew up. Other notable members of the firm through the years included Cyrus Nils Tavares, Alan Cooke Kay, and W. F.L. Stanley.

Government offices
Preceded by Arthur P. Peterson	Republic of Hawaii Attorney General; 1893–1899	Succeeded by Henry E. Cooper
