= James A. King =

James Anderson King
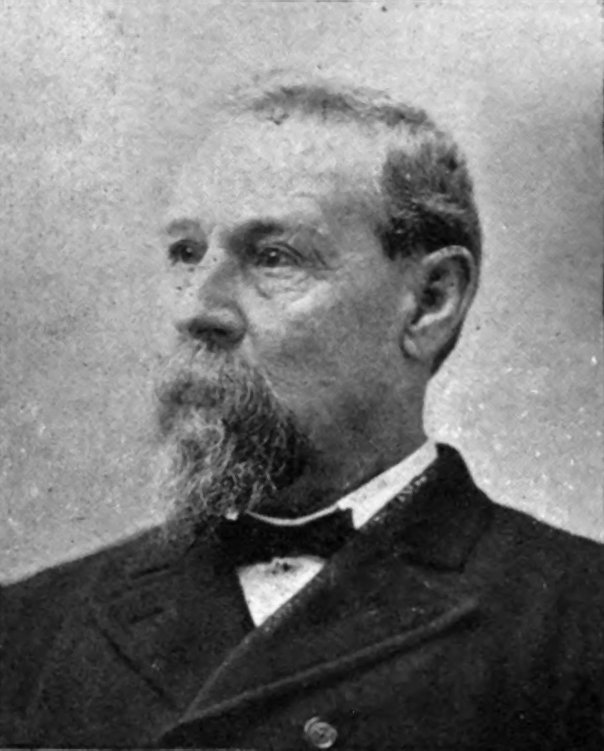
- Born: December 4, 1832; Bridge of Allan, Scotland
- Died: October 16, 1899 (aged 66); Honolulu, Territory of Hawaii
- Occupations: Shipping, Politician
- Children: Samuel Wilder King
- Relatives: Samuel Pailthorpe King (grandson)

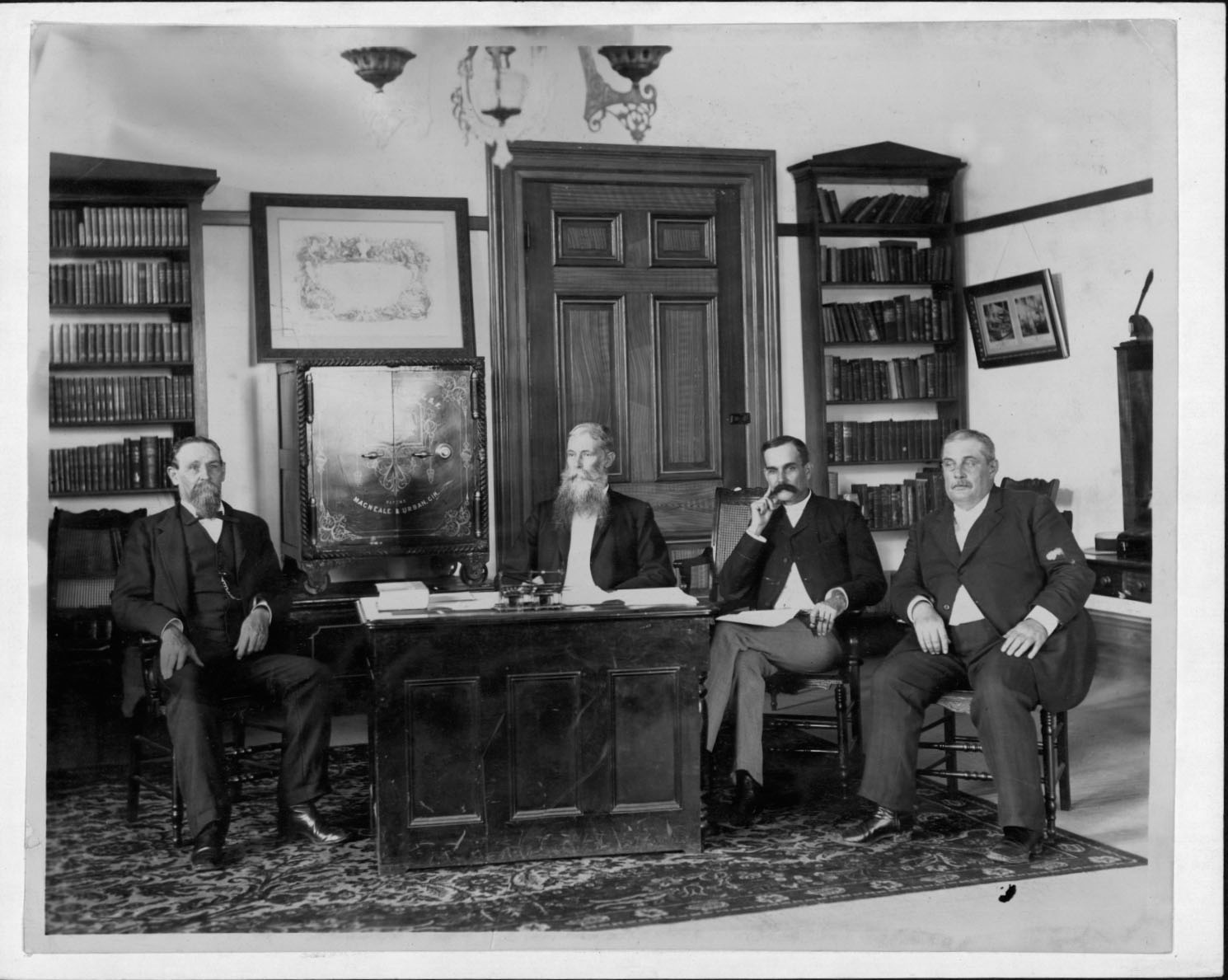
Executive council of the Provisional Government (left to right): James A. King, Sanford B. Dole, W. O. Smith and P. C. Jones.

James Anderson King (December 4, 1832 – October 16, 1899) was a ship's master who became a politician of the Republic of Hawaii.

== Life ==
James Anderson King was born in Bridge of Allan, Scotland on December 4, 1832. He arrived in the Kingdom of Hawaii during the 1860s, just after the American Civil War, and worked as ship's master on merchant vessels. He sailed the Kona Packet on trading voyages to Alaska, Kamchatka, and Japan. When Samuel Gardner Wilder arranged to buy the steamship Likelike, King was put in charge. As Wilder grew his fleet, Captain King was made superintendent of all shipping operations. He married Charlotte Holmes Davis, daughter of Robert Grimes Davis. She was the great-granddaughter of Oliver Holmes, an early settler and Governor of Oʻahu, who had married into Hawaiian nobility. Her uncle William Heath Davis (1822–1909) moved to Alta California in the 1830s.

After the overthrow of the Kingdom of Hawaii, King was made minister of the interior for the Provisional Government of Hawaii on January 17, 1893. He also served as minister of Interior of the Republic of Hawaii until his death. On June 3, 1896, he acted as minister of finance until the end of the month when he was replaced by Henry E. Cooper.

King died October 16, 1899, while trying to teach his six-year-old son how to swim in the ocean. He had an elaborate state funeral at ʻIolani Palace (then known as the executive building) with burial at Oahu Cemetery with Masonic rituals of Freemasonry on October 23, 1899. His son Samuel Wilder King became governor of the Territory of Hawaii.

Government offices
| Preceded by John F. Colburn | Republic of Hawaii Minister of Interior; 1893 – 1899 | Succeeded by Alexander Young |
| Preceded by Samuel M. Damon | Acting Republic of Hawaii Minister of Finance; June 1896 | Succeeded by Henry E. Cooper |
