= Alice Cooper Bailey =

American writer

- Born: December 9, 1890; San Diego, California, U.S.
- Died: February 1, 1978 (aged 87); Concord, Massachusetts, U.S.
- Education: Wellesley College; Oahu College; University of Hawaiʻi; Boston Music Conservatory
- Occupation: Writer
- Spouse: George William Bailey (m. 1913)
- Children: 3
- Parent(s): Henry E. Cooper; Mary Ellen Porter
- Writing career
- Genre: Children's literature

Alice Cooper Bailey (December 9, 1890 – February 1, 1978) was an American writer of children's books and articles for periodicals. She is best known for the books Katrina and Jan and Kimo.

== Early life and education ==
Bailey was born on December 9, 1890, in San Diego, California, daughter of Henry Ernest Cooper and Mary Ellen, née Porter. Her family moved to Honolulu, Hawaii, when she was a baby. She attended Wellesley College, Oahu College, the University of Hawaii, the Boston Music Conservatory, and received a lifetime teaching diploma from the Honolulu Normal School.

== Career ==
Bailey published seven books. Unpublished works included a children's history of Hawaii, to be called The Flying Umbrella, and the story of her father, a former judge, minister of Foreign Affairs, and first Secretary of the Territory of Hawaii. She wrote short stories and articles for periodicals, including American Girl, Child Life, Story Parade, and Travel.

She was a member of the Boston Authors Club.

== Personal life ==
Bailey married George William Bailey in 1913, and had three children. She later separated from her husband, and lived in Weston, Massachusetts. She died in Concord, Massachusetts, on 1 February 1978.

== Selected works ==
- Bailey, Alice Cooper, and Herman Rosse. Katrina and Jan. New York: P. F. Volland, 1923. OCLC 4726829
- Bailey, Alice Cooper. The Skating Gander. New York: Wise-Parslow Co, 1927. OCLC 2437943
- Bailey, Alice Cooper, and Lucille Webster Holling. Kimo. New York, N.Y.: Wise-Parslow, 1928. OCLC 3773422
- Bailey, Alice Cooper, Loretta Phillips, and Prentice Phillips. Sun Gold: A Story of the Hawaiian Islands. Boston: Houghton Mifflin Co, 1930. OCLC 16341752
- Bailey, Alice Cooper. Footprints in the Dust. New York: Longmans, Green, 1936. OCLC 11819843
- Bailey, Alice Cooper, and Yukio Tashiro. The Hawaiian Box Mystery. New York: David McKay Co, 1962. OCLC 38865767
- Bailey, Alice Cooper. To Remember Robert Louis Stevenson. New York: McKay, 1966. OCLC 1051684
