= Provisional Government of Hawaii =

1893–1894 post-coup government

Provisional Government of Hawaii Aupuni Kūikawā o Hawaiʻi (Hawaiian)
- 1893–1894
- Flag Coat of arms

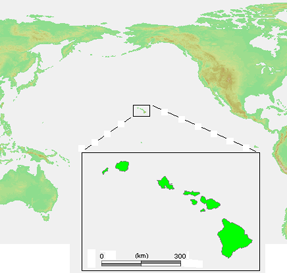
- Status: Provisional government
- Capital: Honolulu
- Common languages: Hawaiian, English
- Leader of the Provisional Government
  - 1893–1894: Lorrin A. Thurston
- Historical era: New Imperialism
  - Monarchy overthrown: January 17 1893
  - Black Week: 14 December 1893 – 11 January 1894
  - Republic declared: July 4 1894
- Currency: Hawaiian dollar, U.S. dollar
Preceded by	Succeeded by
Hawaiian Kingdom	Republic of Hawaii

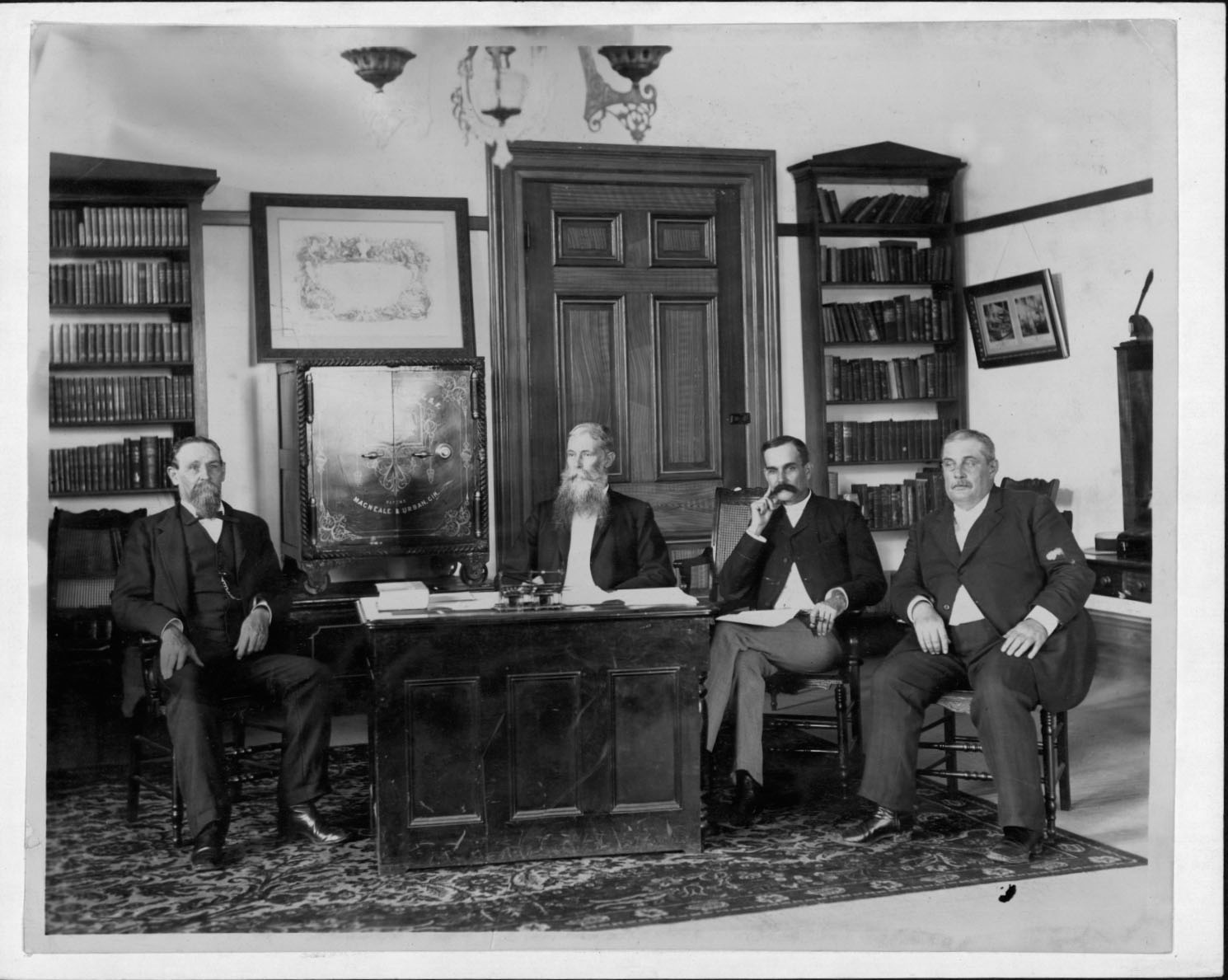
The Provisional Government cabinet, (left to right) James A. King, Sanford B. Dole, W. O. Smith and P. C. Jones in 'Iolani Palace

The Provisional Government of Hawaii (abbr.: P.G.; Hawaiian: Aupuni Kūikawā o Hawaiʻi) was proclaimed after the overthrow of the Hawaiian Kingdom on January 17, 1893, by the 13-member Committee of Safety under the leadership of its chairman Henry E. Cooper and former judge Sanford B. Dole as the designated President of Hawaii. It replaced the Kingdom of Hawaii after the overthrow of Queen Liliʻuokalani as a provisional government until the Republic of Hawaii was established on July 4, 1894.

== Provisional government ==
Following the overthrow of the Kingdom of Hawaii, the coup leaders established the Provisional Government and set out to effect Hawaii's speedy annexation by the United States. The provisional government sent a commission including Lorrin A. Thurston to the U.S. and negotiated a treaty with President Benjamin Harrison that was quickly sent to the U.S. Senate for approval. At the same time Princess Victoria Kaʻiulani was in Washington D.C. to campaign for the monarchist side and against the coup, which she decried as illegal.

Shortly after assuming office in March 1893, President Grover Cleveland, himself an anti-imperialist, withdrew the treaty and ordered a congressional investigation into the events surrounding the overthrow of the Hawaiian monarchy. After receiving the committee's official report (that July), Cleveland stated that the U.S. had unlawfully used military force and called for the reinstatement of Queen Liliʻuokalani. The matter was referred by Cleveland to Congress after Sanford Dole refused Cleveland's demands, and the U.S. Senate held an unofficial investigation, culminating in the Morgan Report, which completely rejected that there had been any U.S. involvement in the overthrow. After the findings of this committee were submitted, Cleveland reiterated his position, and denounced the Provisional Government as being neither de facto or de jure.

=== Cabinet ===
The government formed immediately after the overthrow of the Hawaiian Kingdom on January 17, 1893. The Cabinet of the Provisional Government of Hawaii (1893–1894)

- Sanford B. Dole – President and Minister of Foreign Affairs
- J. A. King – Minister of the Interior
- P. C. Jones – Minister of Finance
- William O. Smith – Attorney-General (Minister of Justice)

These four were appointed as the core executive ministers of the provisional regime that governed Hawaii between the overthrow of Queen Liliʻuokalani and the establishment of the Republic of Hawaii on July 4, 1894.

== Hawaiian Army ==
Following the overthrow of the monarchy a military was formed on January 27, 1893, and put under the command of Colonel John Harris Soper. This military consisted of four companies: three national guard companies and one regular army company. The national guard companies were: the A Company made up of ethnic German volunteers, commanded by Charles W. Zeigler; B Company made up of members of the Honolulu Rifles, commanded by Hugh Gunn; and C Company made up of ethnic Portuguese volunteers, commanded by Joseph M. Camara. The regulars were D company made up, like B Company, from the Honolulu Rifles, commanded by John Good.

The military was active under the Provisional Government of Hawaii where they were activated in the Leprosy War in 1893 and the Republic of Hawaii and were again activated during the 1895 Counter-Revolution in Hawaii in 1895. After Hawaii was annexed becoming the Territory of Hawaii in 1898, the companies entered the Army National Guard system and became part of the Hawaii Army National Guard.

== Home front ==
Under the new administration the Government was made more restrictive, including denying citizenship to Chinese immigrants. The Hawaii Department of Education drove the Hawaiian language to near extinction in favor of English. They also restricted voting from 14,000 under the Bayonet Constitution to 4,000 people, most of them politicians in power of the population of approximately 100,000. James Henderson Blount would comment on this disproportion of voters and population in his report Blount Report.

The testimony of leading annexationists is that if the question of annexation was submitted to a popular vote, excluding all persons who could not read and write except foreigners (under the Australian-ballot system, which is the law of the land), that annexation would be defeated.

== Blount investigation ==
The first order of business for the Provisional Government after the overthrow of Liliuokalani was to form an interim government while Lorrin A. Thurston was in Washington, DC, to negotiate annexation with Congress. One group proposed the assumption of power of Princess Kaʻiulani while a body formed by the Committee of Safety could act as a regency government. With the physical absence of the princess from the islands, the proposal was immediately struck down.

The Provisional Government was dealt a huge blow when United States President Benjamin Harrison, who was supportive of the annexation of Hawaii, was voted out of the White House. Grover Cleveland, an anti-imperialist, assumed the presidency and right away worked to stop the treaty of annexation. Just a month before Cleveland became president, Lorrin A. Thurston had struck a deal with Congress as it prepared to ratify a treaty of annexation. Cleveland, having heard the appeals of Princess Kaʻiulani on behalf of her imprisoned aunt, withdrew the treaty and launched an investigation of the matter.

Cleveland appointed James Henderson Blount of Macon, Georgia, as Commissioner Paramount and Minister to Hawaii. His chief mission was to investigate the overthrow of Liliuokalani's government. Blount concluded in his report that the overthrow had utilized the aid of the John L. Stevens, United States Minister to Hawaii who ordered the landing of troops from the USS Boston. On the basis of Blount's report, Cleveland sent Albert Sydney Willis of Kentucky to Honolulu as Minister to Hawaii with secret instructions. Willis, initially rebuffed by the queen, obtained Liliuokalani's promise to grant an amnesty after a considerable delay. After securing that promise, Willis made a formal demand for the dissolution of the Provisional Government and complete restoration of the monarchy, although unbeknownst to him by that time it was too late since Cleveland had already referred the matter to Congress. Taking the demand at face value, on December 23, 1893, Sanford B. Dole sent a reply to Willis flatly refusing to surrender the authority of the Provisional Government to the deposed queen.

== Morgan investigation ==
In response to Cleveland's referral of the matter, the Senate passed a resolution empowering its Foreign Relations Committee to hold public hearings under oath, and cross-examine witnesses, to investigate U.S. involvement in the revolution and also to investigate whether it had been proper for President Cleveland to appoint Blount and give him extraordinary powers to represent the U.S. and intervene in Hawaii without Senate confirmation. John Tyler Morgan, an expansionist pro-annexation Senator from Alabama, chaired the commission.

On February 26, 1894, the Morgan Report was submitted. It concluded that U.S. troops had remained completely neutral during the overthrow, exonerated Minister Stevens in landing troops, and concluded Blount's appointment and investigation without congressional approval were constitutional. However, the nine-member Senate Foreign Relations Committee that submitted the report could not agree on a final conclusion, and the oft-executive summary was signed only by Morgan himself.

Following the Morgan Report, and the Turpie Resolution on May 31, 1894, in which Congress prohibited any further intervention by the president and other government officials against the Provisional Government of Hawaii, Cleveland officially declared the Provisional Government as "neither de jure nor de facto".

On February 7, 1894, the US House of Representatives issued the following resolution:

In the U.S. House of Representatives, Feb. 7, 1894:

Resolved First. That it is the sense of this House that the action of the United States minister in employing United States naval forces and illegally aiding in overthrowing the constitutional Government of the Hawaiian Islands in January, 1893, and in setting up in its place a Provisional Government not republican in form and in opposition to the will of a majority of the people, was contrary to the traditions of our Republic and the spirit of our Constitution, and should be and is condemned.

Second. That we heartily approve the principle announced by the President of the United States that interference with the domestic affairs of an independent nation is contrary to the spirit of American institutions. And it is further the sense of this House that the annexation of the Hawaiian Islands to our country, or the assumption of a protectorate over them by our Government, is uncalled for and inexpedient; that the people of that country should have had absolute freedom and independence in pursuing their own line of policy, and that foreign intervention in the political affairs of the islands will not be regarded with indifference by the Government of the United States.

== Republic of Hawaii ==
Following the Morgan Report, and the Turpie Resolution which stated a policy of non-interference in Hawaiian affairs by the U.S., Lorrin A. Thurston and the Provisional Government of Hawaii convened a constitutional convention and established the Republic of Hawaii. This government maintained power until the U.S. annexed Hawaii in 1898 with the Newlands Resolution.
