= Sanford B. Dole =

American judge and Hawaii politician (1844–1926)

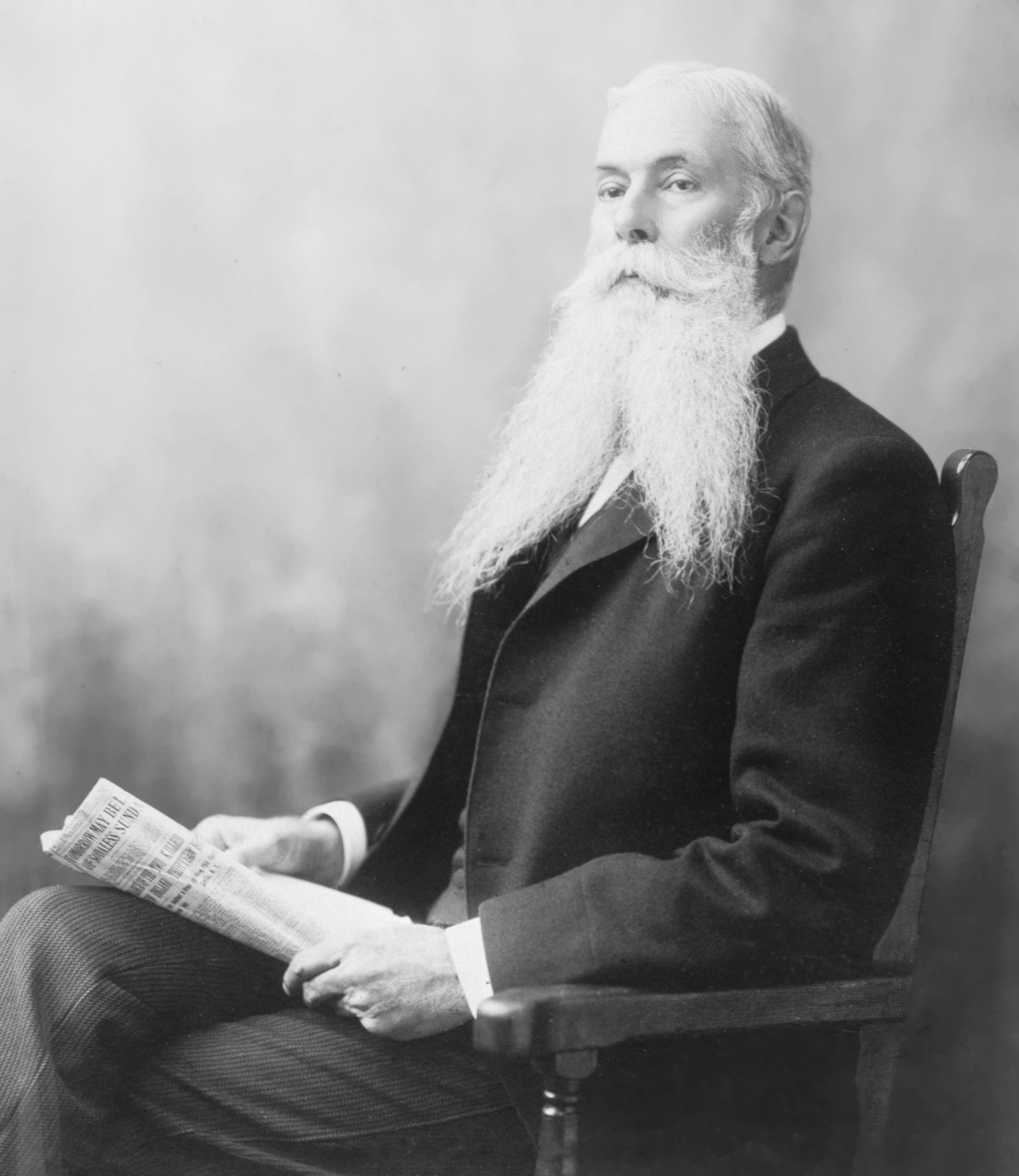
- Dole, c. 1902

1st Territorial Governor of Hawaii
- In office June 14, 1900 – November 23, 1903
- Appointed by: William McKinley
- Preceded by: Himself (as President)
- Succeeded by: George Carter

President of Hawaii
- In office July 4, 1894 – August 12, 1898
- Vice President: William Chauncey Wilder
- Preceded by: Liliʻuokalani (as Queen of the Hawaiian Kingdom)
- Succeeded by: Himself (as Territorial Governor)

Judge of the United States District Court for the Territory of Hawaii
- In office November 18, 1903 – December 16, 1915
- Appointed by: Theodore Roosevelt
- Preceded by: Morris M. Estee
- Succeeded by: Horace W. Vaughan

President of the Provisional Government
- In office January 17, 1893 – July 4, 1894
- Leader: Lorrin A. Thurston

Minister of Foreign Affairs
- In office January 17, 1893 – July 4, 1894
- President: Himself

Personal details
- Born: Sanford Ballard Dole; April 23, 1844 Honolulu, Hawaiian Kingdom
- Died: June 9, 1926 (aged 82) Honolulu, Territory of Hawaii
- Party: Republican
- Other political affiliations: Reform (Hawaii)
- Spouse: Anna Prentice Cate (m. 1873)
- Education: Williams College

Sanford Ballard Dole (April 23, 1844 – June 9, 1926) was a lawyer and jurist. He lived through the periods when Hawaii was a kingdom, provisional government, republic, and territory. Dole advocated the westernization of Hawaiian government and culture. After the overthrow of the monarchy, he served as the President of the Republic of Hawaii, until his government secured Hawaii's annexation by the United States. He then became the Territory of Hawaii's first Governor and the second Judge of the Hawaiian District Court.

== Early life ==
Dole was born April 23, 1844, in Honolulu to Protestant Christian missionaries from Maine in the United States. His father was Daniel Dole (1808–1878), principal at Oahu College (known as Punahou School after 1934), and his mother was Emily Hoyt Ballard (1808–1844). His mother died from complications within a few days of his birth. Dole was named after his maternal uncle, Sanford K. Ballard, a classmate of his father's at Bowdoin College who died in 1841. He was nursed by a native Hawaiian, and his father married Charlotte Close Knapp in 1846. In 1855 the family moved to Kōloa on the island of Kauaʻi, where they operated another school, which Sanford attended.

Dole attended Oahu College for one year and then Williams College in 1866–1867. He worked in a law office in Boston for another year. At this time in the United States, admission to the bar was by reading for the bar and thirty years later, in 1897, he would receive an honorary LL.D. degree from Williams in recognition of his service as the first and only elected president of Hawaii.

In 1873 he married Anna Prentice Cate. In December 1880 he was commissioned as a Notary Public in Honolulu. Dole won the 1884 and 1886 elections to the legislature of the Hawaiian Kingdom as a representative from Kauaʻi, serving from 1884 to 1887, during which time he was active in securing the constitution of 1887.

== Bayonet Constitution ==
In June 1887, local businessmen, sugar planters, and politicians backed by the Honolulu Rifles forced the dismissal of the cabinet of controversial Walter M. Gibson and forced the adoption of the 1887 Constitution of the Kingdom of Hawaii. The new documents limited voting rights to the literate males of Hawaiian, European, and American descent, while imposing income and wealth requirements to be eligible to vote for the House of Nobles. This effectively consolidated power among the elite residents of the island. In addition, the new Constitution minimized the power of the Monarch in favor of more influential governance by the cabinet. Dole and other lawyers of American descent drafted this document, which became known as the "Bayonet Constitution".

King Kalākaua appointed Dole a justice of the Supreme Court of the Kingdom of Hawaii on December 28, 1887, and to a commission to revise judiciary laws on January 24, 1888. After Kalākaua's death, his sister Queen Liliʻuokalani appointed him to her Privy Council on August 31, 1891.

== End of the monarchy ==
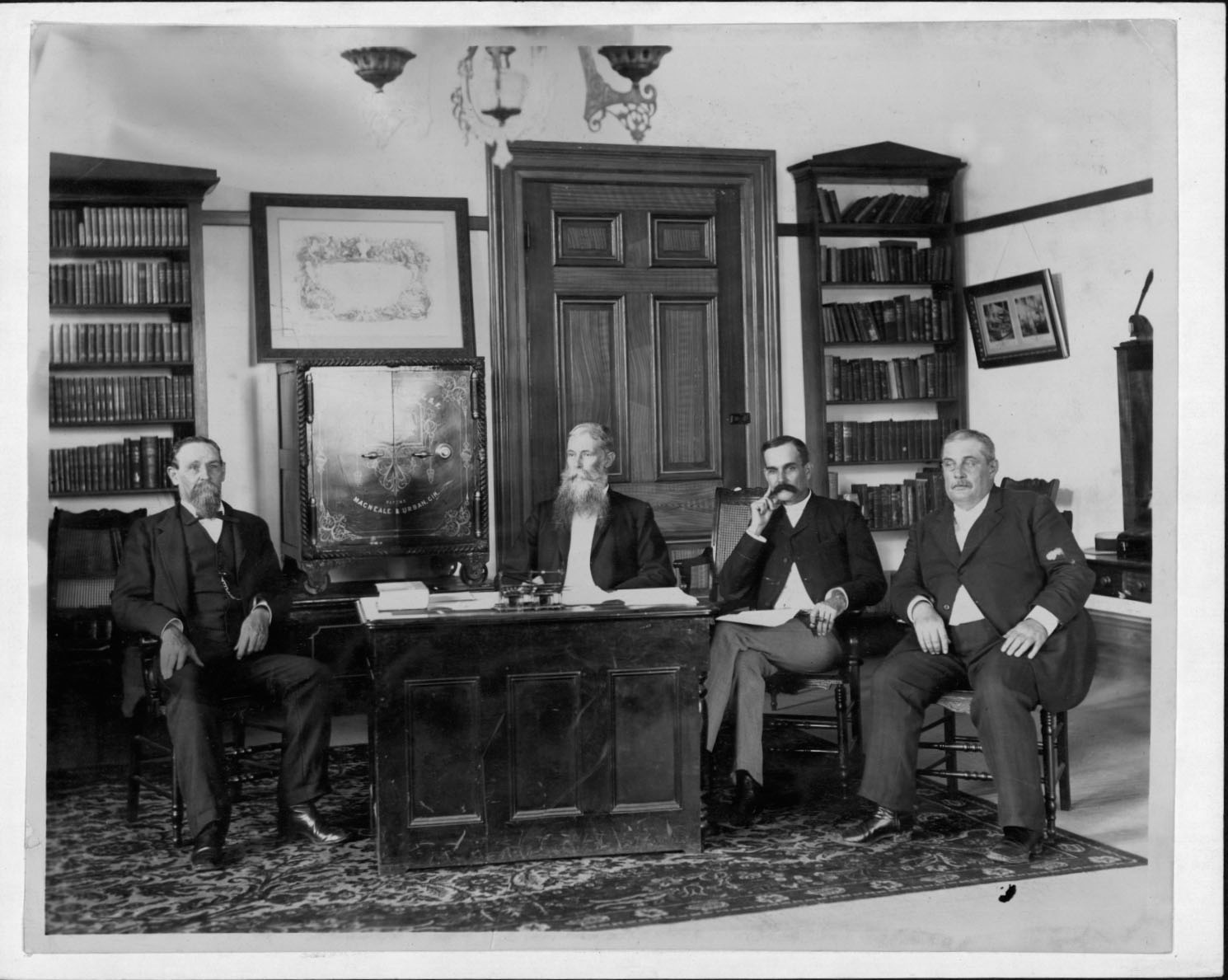
Provisional Government cabinet, (left to right) James A. King, Dole, W. O. Smith and P. C. Jones

The monarchy ended on January 17, 1893, after the 1893 Hawaiian Coup organized by many of the same actors involved in the 1887 revolt. Although Dole declined to officially be part of the Committee of Safety, he helped draft their declaration.

Dole was named president of the Provisional Government of Hawaii that was formed after the coup and was recognized within 48 hours by all nations with diplomatic ties to the Kingdom of Hawaii, including the United Kingdom. His cabinet (called the "executive council") included James A. King as minister of the interior, William Owen Smith as attorney general, and banker Peter Cushman Jones as minister of finance. Dole acted as Minister of Foreign Affairs himself until February 15, 1894. Later Samuel Mills Damon would serve as Minister of Finance.

With Grover Cleveland's election as President of the United States, the Provisional Government's hopes of annexation were derailed for a time. Indeed, Cleveland tried to directly help reinstate the monarchy, after an investigation led by James Henderson Blount. The Blount Report of July 17, 1893, commissioned by President Cleveland, concluded that the Committee of Safety conspired with U.S. ambassador John L. Stevens to land the United States Marine Corps, to forcibly remove Queen Liliʻuokalani from power, and declare a Provisional Government of Hawaii consisting of members from the Committee of Safety.

On November 16, 1893, Albert Willis presented the Queen with Cleveland's request that she grant amnesty to the revolutionists in return for being restored to the throne. This request she flatly refused, stating that the revolutionists should be punished and should have their lands confiscated. According to Willis, she recommended that they be put to death. Though she later denied ever having recommended any such thing, her alleged attitude lost her the goodwill of the Cleveland administration, which thereupon recognized the Republic of Hawaii on July 4, 1894.

The Morgan Report of February 26, 1894, concluded that the overthrow was locally based, that it had its origins in monarchical corruption, and that American troops had not tried to bring about the monarchy's collapse: rather, that the troops had acted merely to protect American property and citizens. Not long afterward, the Provisional Government held a constitutional convention. On July 4, 1894, this convention proclaimed the formal establishment of the Republic of Hawaii.

== President of the Republic of Hawaii ==
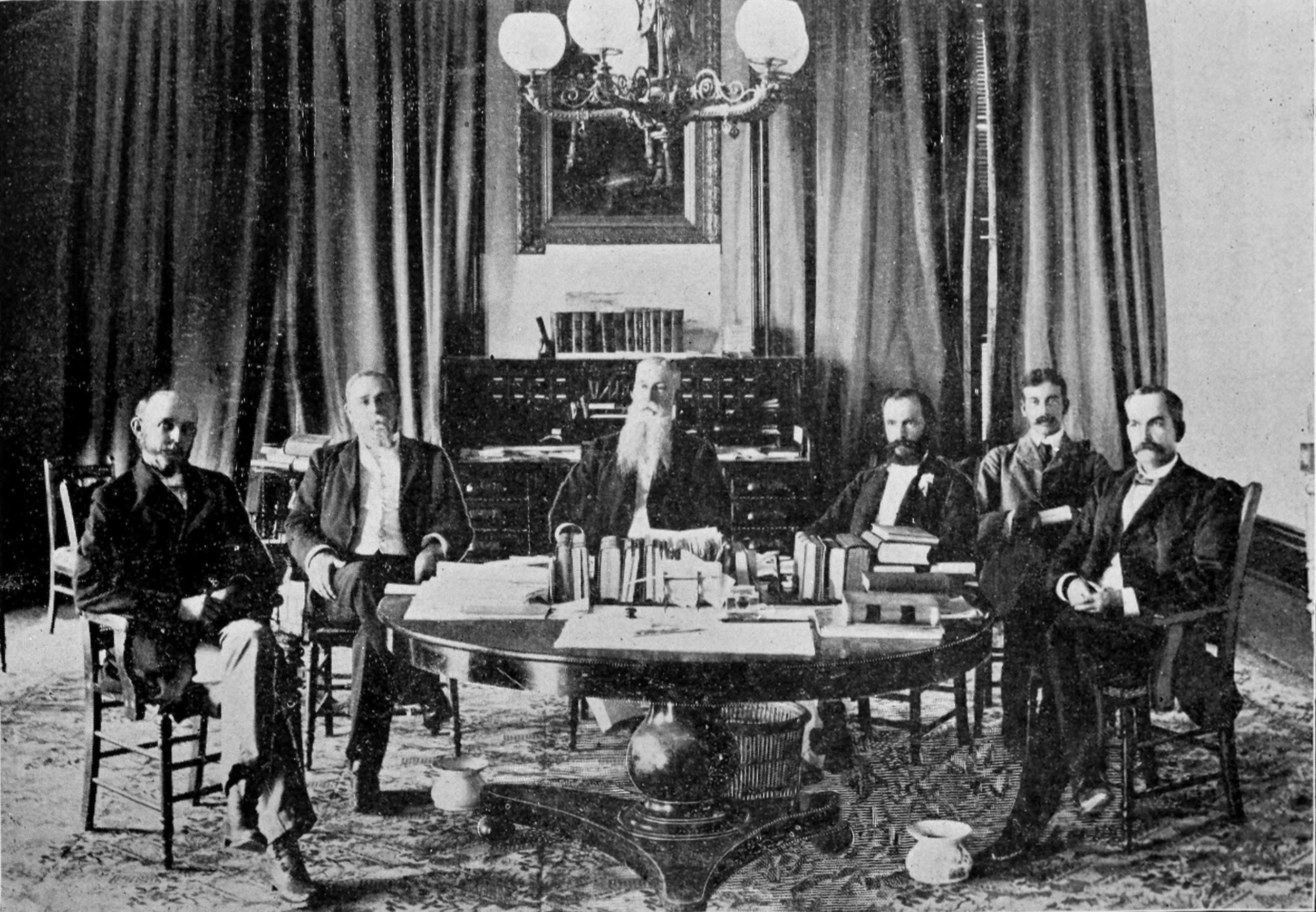
President Dole and the Cabinet of the Republic

Lorrin A. Thurston declined to run for the presidency of the Republic of Hawaii, and Dole ran instead, winning election in 1894. Dole would serve as the first and only elected president of the Republic of Hawaii from 1894 to 1898. The electoral system of the Republic was established by those who had overthrown the monarchy. Voting rights were restricted and the electoral process resulted in the consolidation of power within the Republic to the elite of American and European descent. As president, Dole appointed Thurston to lead the lobbying effort in Washington, D.C., to secure Hawaiʻi's annexation by the United States.

Dole's government secured diplomatic recognition from every nation that had recognized the Kingdom of Hawaii, and weathered several attempts to restore the monarchy, including a January 1895 counter-rebellion led by Robert William Wilcox. After being defeated, Wilcox and the other conspirators were captured and sentenced to death, but had their sentences reduced or commuted by Dole. Queen Liliʻuokalani abdicated and, under duress, swore allegiance to the Republic of Hawaii, declaring, "I hereby do fully and unequivocally admit and declare that the Government of the Republic of Hawaii is the only lawful Government of the Hawaiian Islands, and that the late Hawaiian monarchy is finally and forever ended and no longer of any legal or actual validity, force or effect whatsoever." She later provided a more detailed accounting of the events from her perspective in her book, Hawaii's story by Hawaii's queen, Liliuokalani.

== State Visit to the United States ==
As president of the republic, Dole traveled to Washington, D.C., in early 1898 to personally urge annexation of Hawaii by the United States. Dole and his party traveled from Honolulu to San Francisco via steamship, arriving in the Bay on January 16. This marked the United States' fifth state visit by a foreign leader, the first being King Kalakaua's visit to the United States in 1874. After arriving in San Francisco, President Dole stayed in San Francisco's Occidental Hotel, before leaving the city for Washington D.C on January 19. On the President's last day in San Francisco, he was given a tour of the Presidio of San Francisco by General William Rufus Shafter, with the military band playing upon his arrival, and also had a luncheon with San Francisco's mayor James D. Phelan. President Dole and his party took off for Washington D.C via railroad, using a private railcar named "Guadalupe", supplied by Henry E. Huntington.

Dole's travels would eventually take him to Chicago, where he was received by infantry and cavalry troops from Fort Sheridan. Eventually the President would reach his destination of Washington, D.C., on January 26, where he was met by Secretary of State John Sherman, and had a short conversation with President William McKinley. Sanford Dole and his party would leave Washington, D.C., on February 6, towards California, arriving in the city of Riverside on February 12.

== Governor and federal judge ==
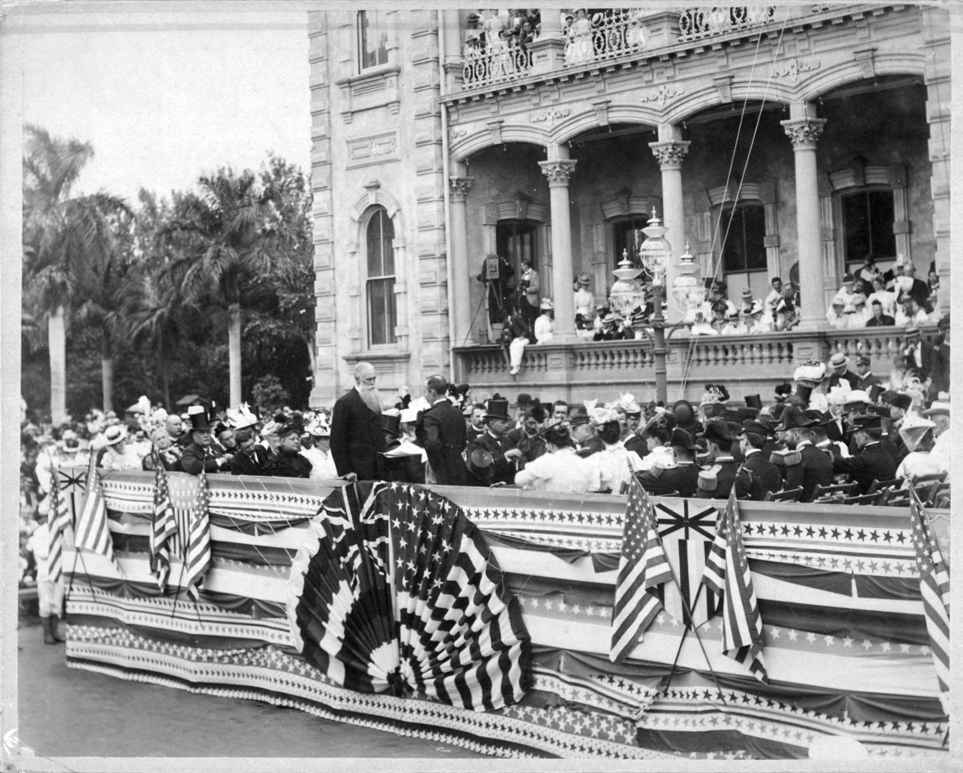
U.S. Minister to Hawaii Harold M. Sewall (right) accepts the transfer of Hawaiian state sovereignty from President Dole, August 12, 1898

On July 4, 1898, the U.S. Congress passed a joint resolution to annex the Republic of Hawaii. Known as the Newlands Resolution after its sponsor, U.S. Representative Francis Newlands (D-Nevada), it came into effect on August 12, 1898. A formal ceremony marking the transfer of Hawaiian state sovereignty to the United States was held that day on the steps of ʻIolani Palace, where the Hawaiian flag was lowered and the American flag raised in its place.

Under the terms of the Resolution, Dole retained the powers he previously exercised as President of Hawaii while Congress developed a new Hawaiian territorial frame of government. Later, when one was established through the Hawaiian Organic Act, President William McKinley appointed Dole as the first governor of the Territory of Hawaii. Dole assumed the office on June 14, 1900, serving for three years until his resignation on November 23, 1903, to accept an appointment by President Theodore Roosevelt as judge for the U.S. District Court of Hawaii after the death of Morris M. Estee. He served in that post until his retirement on December 16, 1915, and was replaced by Horace Worth Vaughan.

Dole also served on commissions for Honolulu parks and the public archives. He died after a series of strokes on June 9, 1926. His ashes were interred in the cemetery of Kawaiahaʻo Church.

== Family and legacy ==
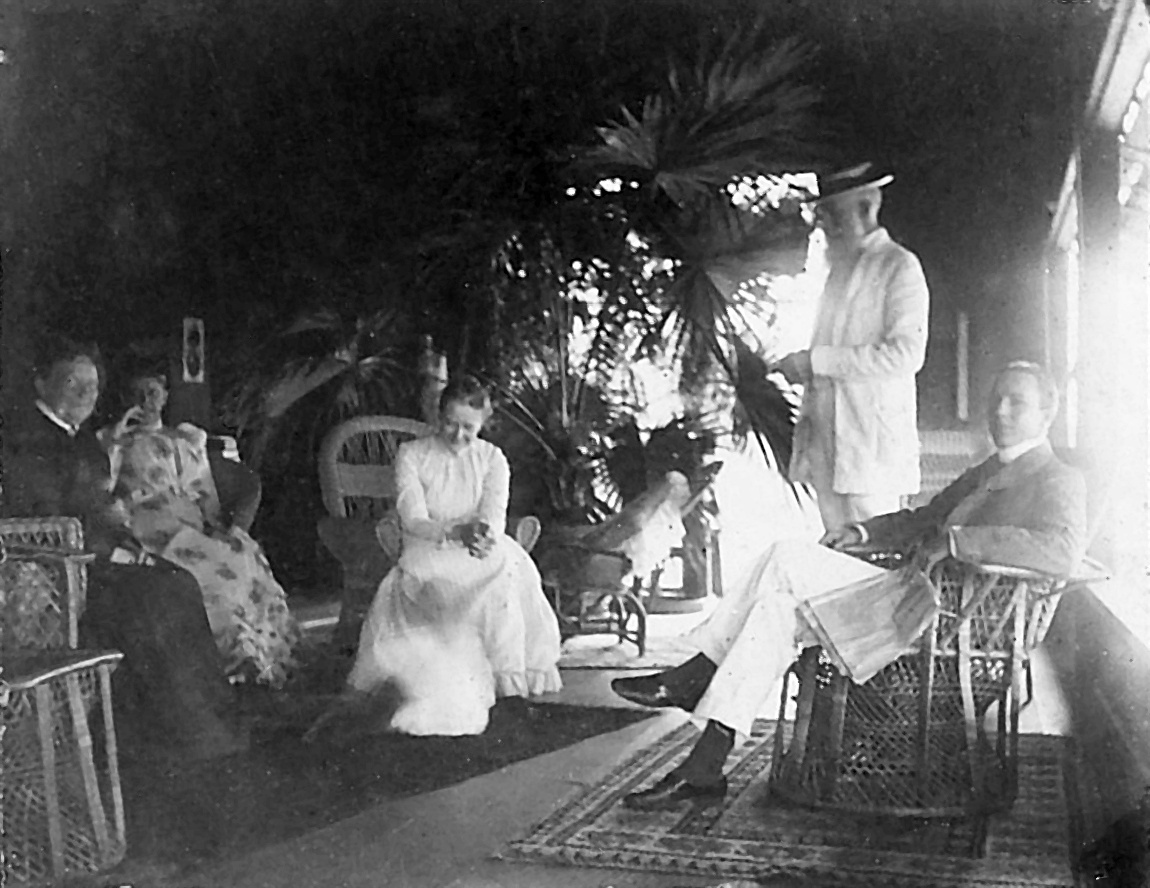
Dole with family members.

Dole's cousin, Edmund Pearson Dole, came to Hawaii to practice law in 1895, and became Attorney General of Hawaii from 1900 to 1903. Another cousin, James Dole, came to Hawaii in 1899 and founded the Hawaiian Pineapple Company on Oahu, which later became the Dole Food Company. James' father Charles Fletcher Dole also came to Hawaii in 1909.

Dole Middle School, located in Kalihi Valley on the island of Oʻahu, was named after him in April 1956, about a century after his father founded the school in Kōloa. In the film Princess Kaiulani, his role was played by Will Patton.

In Hawaiian, the pale and hair-like Spanish moss is called ʻumiʻumi-o-Dole, meaning "Dole's beard". His wife Anna had the bird species Ciridops anna named after her.

Political offices
Preceded by Liliʻuokalani as Queen of the Hawaiian Kingdom	President of Hawaii; 1894–1898	Republic of Hawaii annexed by United States
First Territory of Hawaii established	Territorial Governor of Hawaii; 1900–1903	Succeeded by George R. Carter
Legal offices
Preceded by Morris M. Estee	United States District Court Judge; 1903–1915	Succeeded by Horace W. Vaughan
