= List of artists who painted Hawaii and its people =

The following is a list of artists who painted Hawaii and its people.

== A ==
- Emerson Andelin (1902–1982), painter, muralist
- Robert Wilson Andrews (1837–1922), Hawaii-born draftsperson and engineer.
- Jacques Arago (1790–1855), French explorer, draftsmen, and writer

== B ==
- Edward Bailey (1814–1903) missionary, painter
- Robert C. Barnfield (1856–1893), English painter
- Charles W. Bartlett (1860–1940), English painter and printmaker
- Don Blanding (1894–1957) poet, journalist, cartoonist
- Esther Bruton (1896–1992), painter, printmaker, mosaicist, ceramist, and commercial artist
- George Henry Burgess (1831–1905), English–American painter, wood engraver, and lithographer

== C ==
- Jean Charlot (1898–1979), French-born American painter, illustrator
- Nicholas Chevalier (1828–1902), Russian-born painter
- Patrick Ching (born c. 1963), conservationist and wildlife artist, ornithological illustrator, and children's book author
- Louis Choris (1795–1828), German–Russian painter and explorer
- Henry B. Christian (1883–1953), painter
- Ernest William Christmas (1863–1918), Australian painter
- Edward Clifford (1844–1907), English artist and author
- William F. Cogswell (1819–1903), portrait painter
- William A. Coulter (1849–1936), Irish-born American painter

== D ==
- Robert Dampier (1799–1874), British painter and clergyman
- Stanislas Darondeau (1807–1842), French painter, draftsman and engineer
- Gideon Jacques Denny (1830–1886), marine artist, painter
- Helen Thomas Dranga (1866–1927), British–American painter

== E ==
- Edward Mason Eggleston (1882–1941), painter
- Arthur Webster Emerson (1885–1968), painter
- Paul Emmert (1826–1867), Swiss-born painter
- Robert Lee Eskridge (1891–1975), genre painter, muralist and illustrator.

== F ==
- Hugo Anton Fisher (1854–1916), Czech artist
- Cornelia MacIntyre Foley (1909–2010), painter
- Juliette May Fraser (1887–1983), painter, muralist and printmaker
- Charles Furneaux (1835–1913), painter

== G ==
- Margaret Girvin Gillin (1833–1915), Canadian-born American painter
- René Gillotin (1814–1861), French naval officer and painter
- Constance Gordon-Cumming (1837–1924), Scottish travel writer and painter
- Alfred Richard Gurrey Sr. (1852–1944), English-born American landscape painter

== H ==
- Arthur Trevor Haddon (1864–1941), British painter and illustrator
- John Hayter (1800–1895), English portrait painter
- Ruehl Frederick Heckman (1890–1942), painter, illustrator, photographer
- Hon Chew Hee (1906–1993), painter, printmaker, muralist
- Theodore Heuck (1830–1877), architect
- D. Howard Hitchcock (1861–1943), painter of the Volcano School
- Hiroshi Honda (1910–1970), painter, of Japanese origin
- Grace Hudson (1865–1937), painter

== I ==
- Ogura Yonesuke Itoh (1870–1940), Japanese–American painter

== J ==
- Arthur Johnsen (1952–2015), painter, muralist, illustrator
- Ejler Andreas Jorgensen (1838–1876), Danish-born American landscape and portrait painter

== K ==
- Kaʻiulani (1875–1899), Princess of the Hawaiian Islands, painter
- Herb Kawainui Kāne (1928–2011), painter, historian
- John Melville Kelly (1879–1962), painter

== L ==
- John La Farge (1835–1910), painter
- Huc-Mazelet Luquiens (1881–1961), printmaker, painter and art educator
- Genevieve Springston Lynch (1891–1960), painter and art teacher

== M ==
- Alexander Samuel MacLeod (1888–1956), Canadian-born American painter, printmaker
- Arman Manookian (1904–1931), Armenian–American painter
- Frank Montague Moore (1877–1967), English-born painter, businessperson, museum director

== N ==
- Joseph Nāwahī (1842–1986), Native Hawaiian nationalist leader, legislator, painter, lawyer, and newspaper publisher
- Ben Norris (1910–2006), modernist painter

== O ==
- Georgia O'Keeffe (1887–1986), modernist painter
- Hajime Okuda (1906–1992), Japanese painter

== P ==
- Ambrose McCarthy Patterson (1877–1966), Australian-born American painter, printmaker
- Titian Peale (1799–1885), scientific illustrator, naturalist, and explorer
- Agnes Lawrence Pelton (1881–1961), German-born modernist painter
- Enoch Wood Perry Jr. (1831–1915) painter
- Louis Pohl (1915–1999), painter, illustrator, art teacher, printmaker and cartoonist
- Horatio Nelson Poole (1884–1949), painter, printmaker, muralist and teacher
- John Prendergast (c. 1815–after 1911), English genre painter, illustrator
- Gene Pressler (c. 1893–1933) figurative painter, illustrator

== R ==
- Shirley Russell (1886–1885), painter

== S ==
- Matteo Sandonà (1881–1964), Italian-born painter, portraitist
- Eugene Savage (1883–1978), painter, sculptor
- James G. Sawkins (1806–1878), English artist, geologist, copper miner, and illustrator
- Alexander Scott (1854–1925), English landscape painter
- Eduardo Lefebvre Scovell (1864–1918), British painter, of the Volcano School
- Lloyd Sexton Jr. (1912–1990), painter
- Joseph Henry Sharp (1859–1953), painter
- Susan Louise Shatter (1943–2011), landscape painter
- Allen Sheppard
- Ken Shutt (1928–2010), watercolorist, bronze sculptor
- William Fulton Soare (1896–1940), illustrator, narrative painter
- John Mix Stanley (1814–1872), painter, explorer
- Joseph Dwight Strong (1853–1899), painter, illustrator
- Kelly Sueda (born 1972), painter

== T ==
- Augustus Vincent Tack
- Reuben Tam
- Jules Tavernier
- Persis Goodale Thurston Taylor
- Madge Tennent
- John Paul Thomas
- William Pinkney Toler
- George Burroughs Torrey
- William Twigg-Smith
- Ralph Burke Tyree

== V ==
- Hubert Vos (1855–1935), Dutch painter

== W ==
- Lionel Walden
- John Webber
- Bessie Wheeler
- Henry Otto Wix
- Anna Woodward
- Theodore Wores (1859–1939) painter

== Y ==
- John Chin Young (1909–1997) painter, of Chinese origin

== See also ==
- Category:Painters from Hawaii
- List of artists who made prints of Hawaii and its people
- List of artists who sculpted Hawaii and its people
