= Volcano school =

19th-century art movement in Hawaii

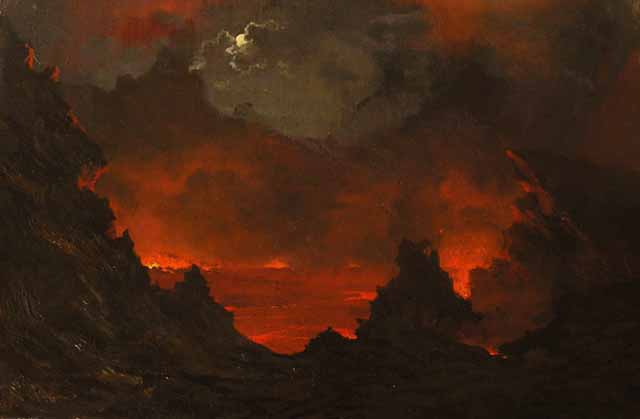
Jules Tavernier's oil on canvas painting Full Moon over Kilauea, 1887

The Volcano school refers to a group of non-native Hawaiian artists who painted dramatic nocturnal scenes of Hawaii's erupting volcanoes. Some of the artists also produced watercolors, which, by the nature of the medium, tended to be diurnal. At their best, these paintings exemplify a fusion of the European Sublime aesthetic, Romantic landscapes, and the American landscape traditions. Two volcanoes on the Island of Hawaii, Kilauea and Mauna Loa, were intermittently active during the 1880s and 1890s, when interest in Volcano school paintings peaked. Getting to Kilauea, the more frequently painted volcano required an arduous two- or three-day roundtrip journey on horseback.

The Volcano school's body of work is largely the product of pieces by Charles Furneaux, Joseph D. Strong, and Jules Tavernier. These artists are now generally thought of as the "old-masters" of Hawaiian painting. Printmaker and art educator Huc-Mazelet Luquiens called this period "a little Hawaiian renaissance".

== Members ==
Jules Tavernier (French 1844–1889) was arguably the most important Volcano school painter. Other artists include Ernst William Christmas (Australian 1863–1918), Constance Fredericka Gordon Cumming (Scottish 1837–1924), Charles Furneaux (American 1835–1913), D. Howard Hitchcock (American 1861–1943), Ogura Yonesuke Itoh (Japanese 1870–1940), Ambrose McCarthy Patterson (Australian 1877–1966), Titian Ramsey Peale (American 1799–1885), Louis Pohl (American 1915–1999), Eduardo Lefebvre Scovell (British 1864–1918), William Pinkney Toler (American 1826–1899), William Twigg-Smith (New Zealander 1883–1950), Joseph Dwight Strong (American 1852–1899) and Lionel Walden (American 1861–1933).

A selection of Volcano school paintings is usually on display at the Honolulu Museum of Art.

== Related work ==
Although the American landscape painter Frederic Edwin Church produced similar paintings of Ecuador’s Cotopaxi Volcano during and after visits in 1853 and 1857, he is not considered a member of this group and he never visited the Hawaiian Islands.

== Selected works ==
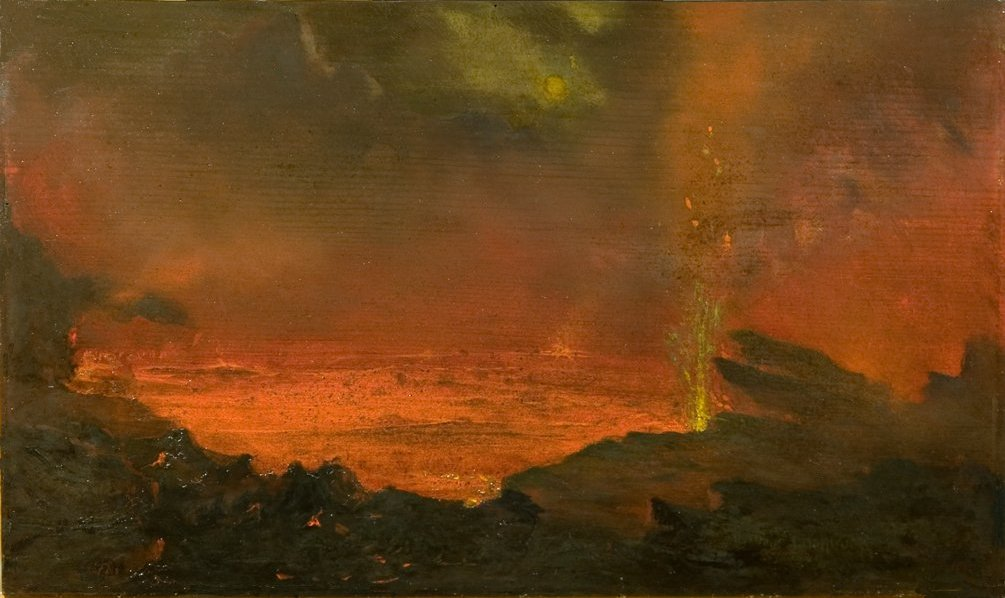
Halemaumau, Lake of Fire
D. Howard Hitchcock, 1888

Kalapana, Day Seven
Louis Pohl

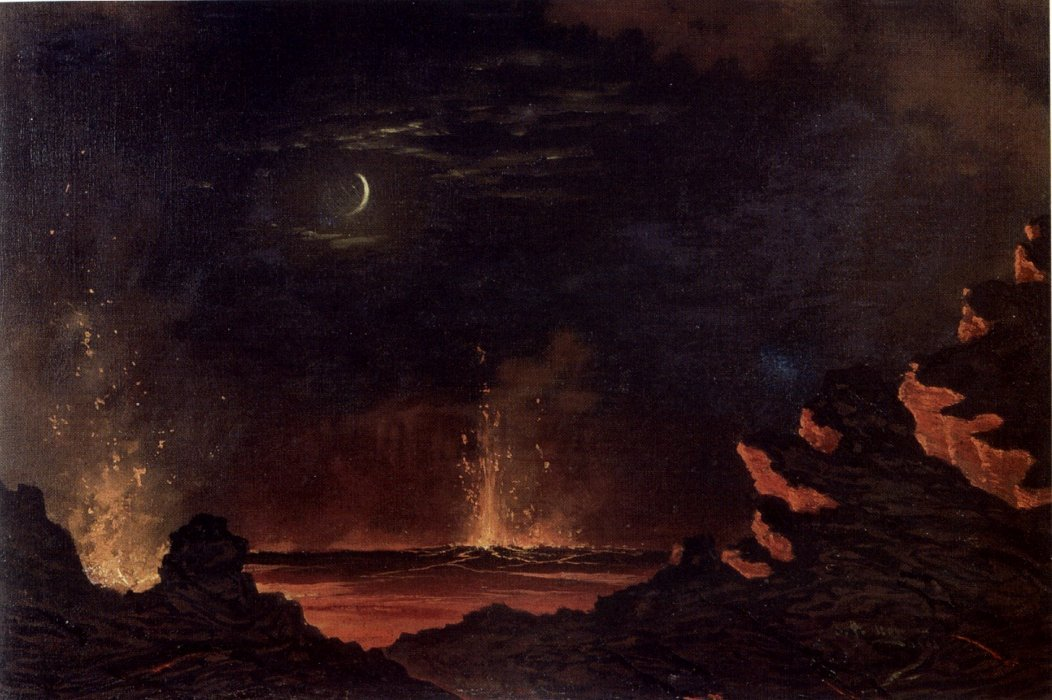
Kilauea
Ogura Yonesuke Itoh, 1908, Honolulu Museum of Art

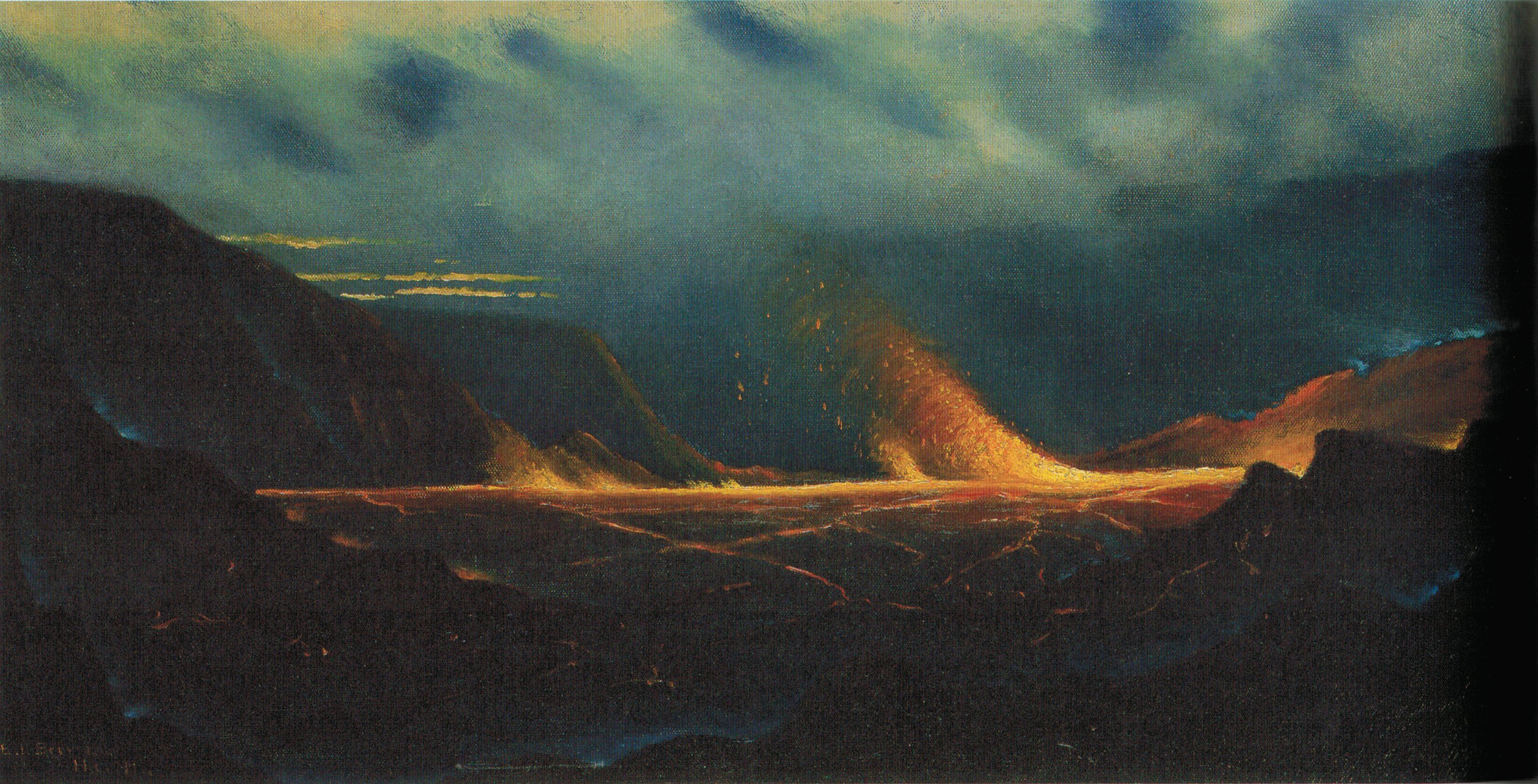
Kilauea
Eduardo Lefebvre Scovell, c. 1890

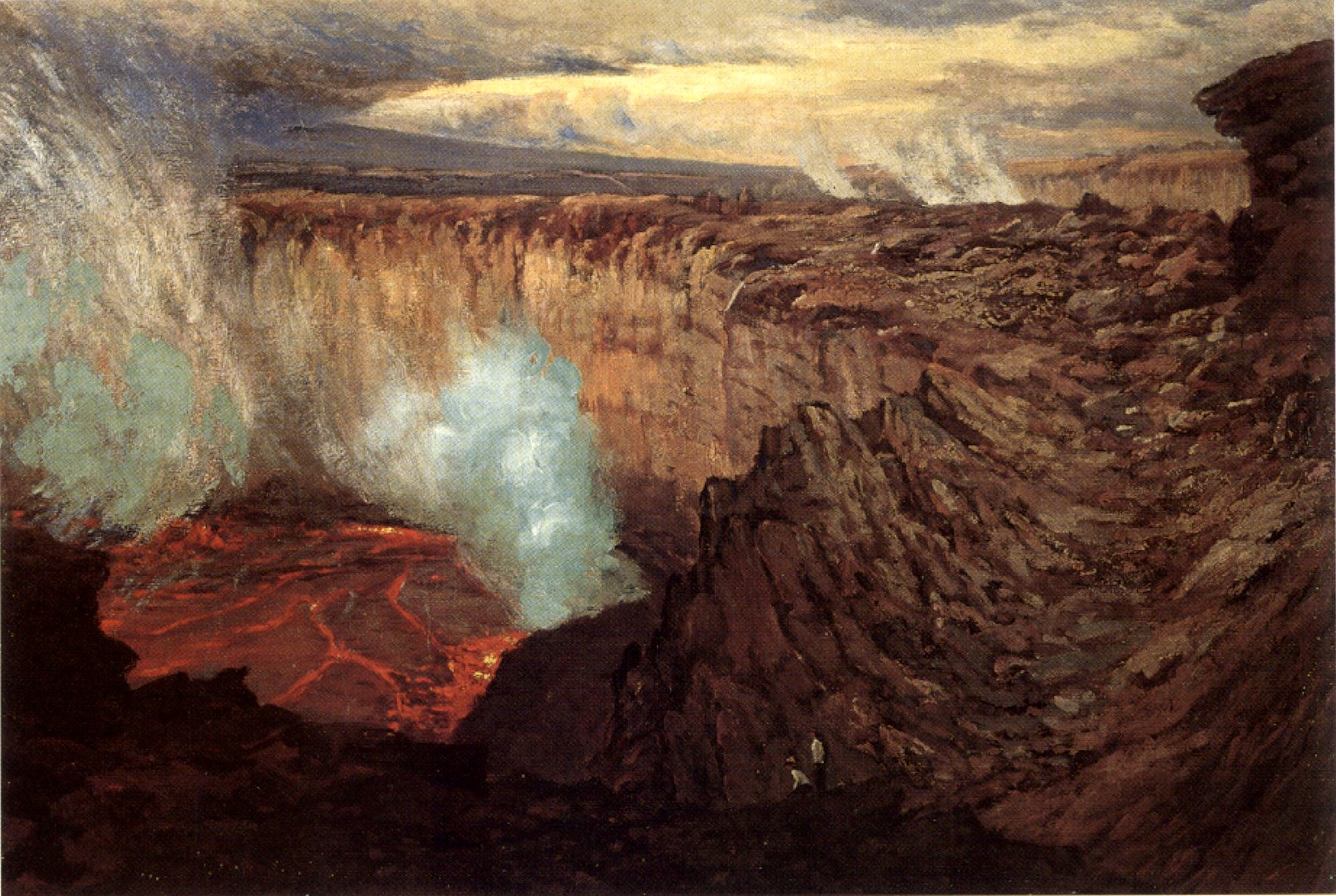
Kilauea Caldera
Ernst William Christmas, 1916–1918

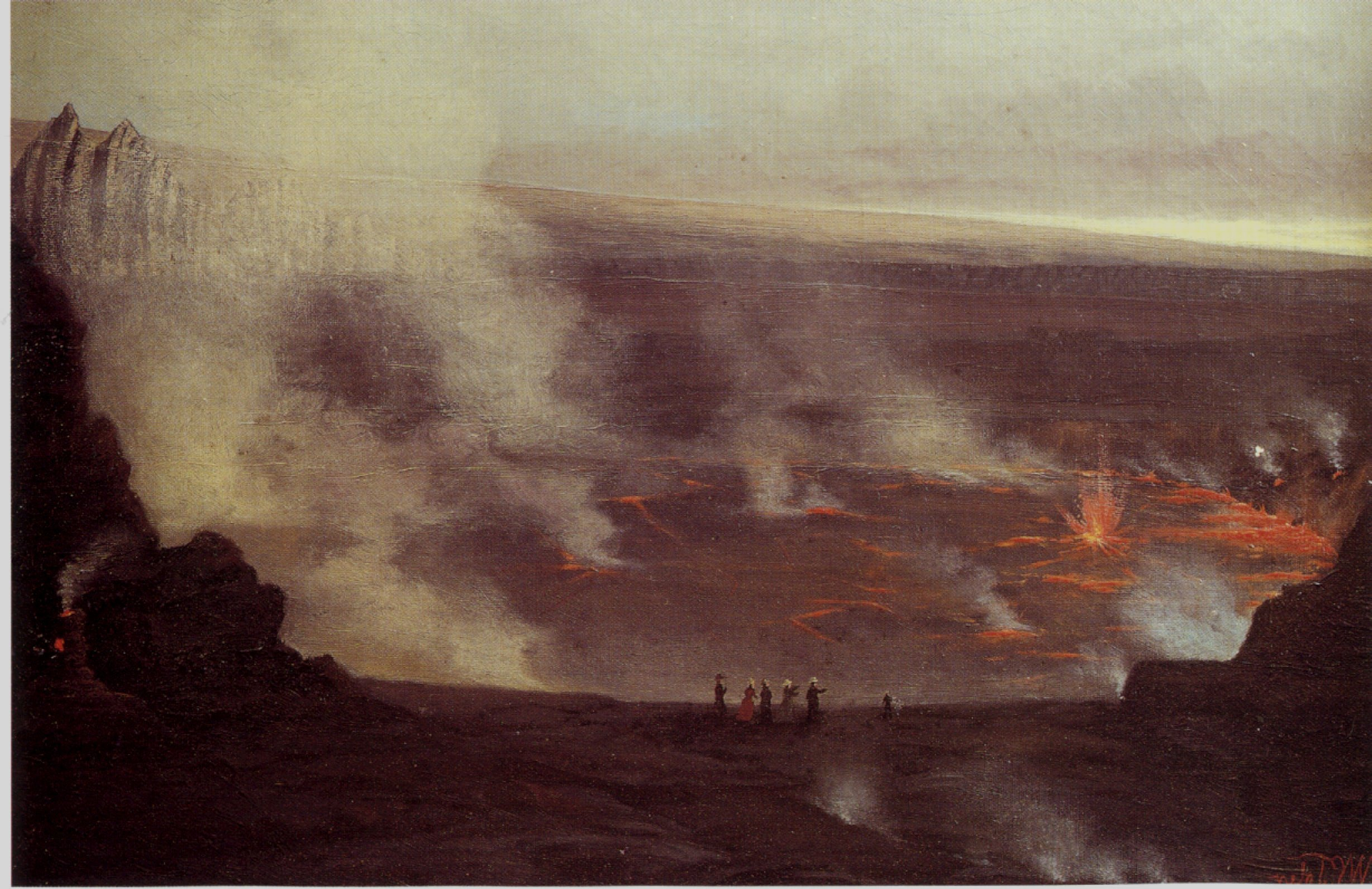
Kilauea Volcano
William Pinkney Toler, c. 1860s

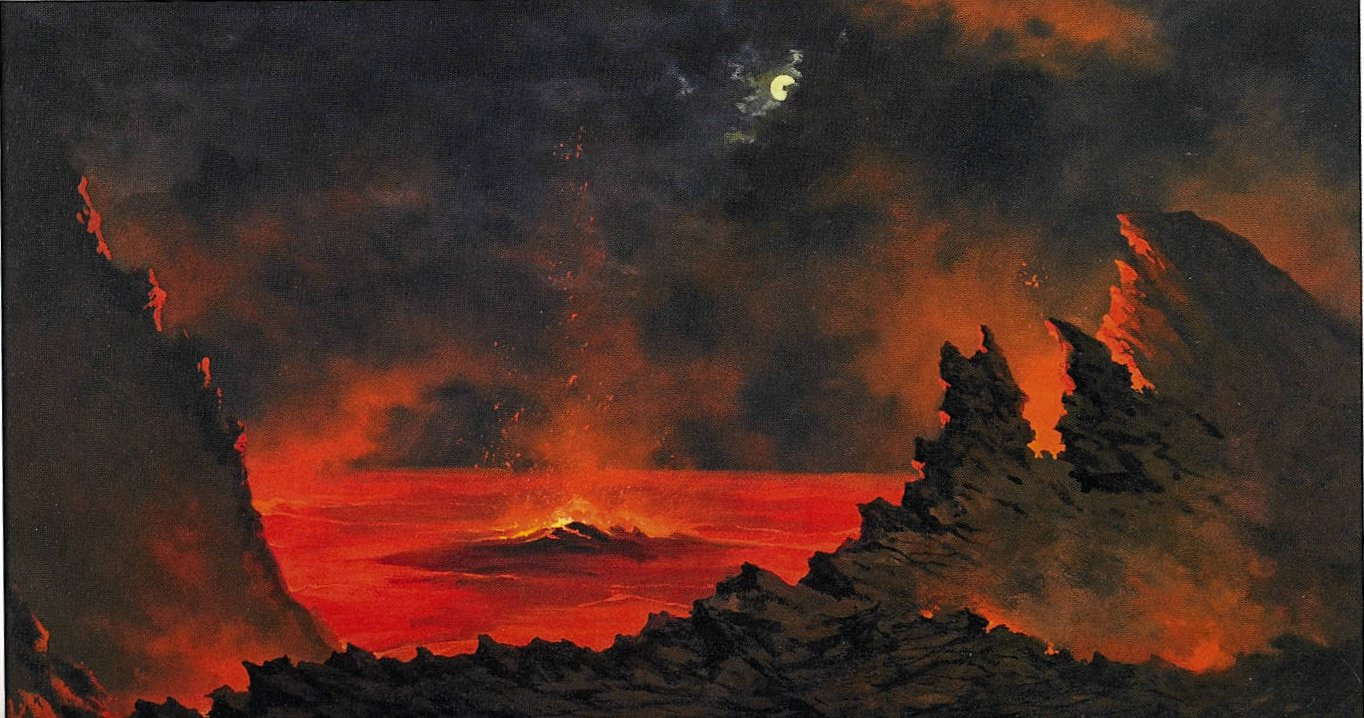
Volcano at Night
Jules Tavernier, c. 1880s, Honolulu Museum of Art
