= List of painters by name beginning with "C" =

Kltinjo

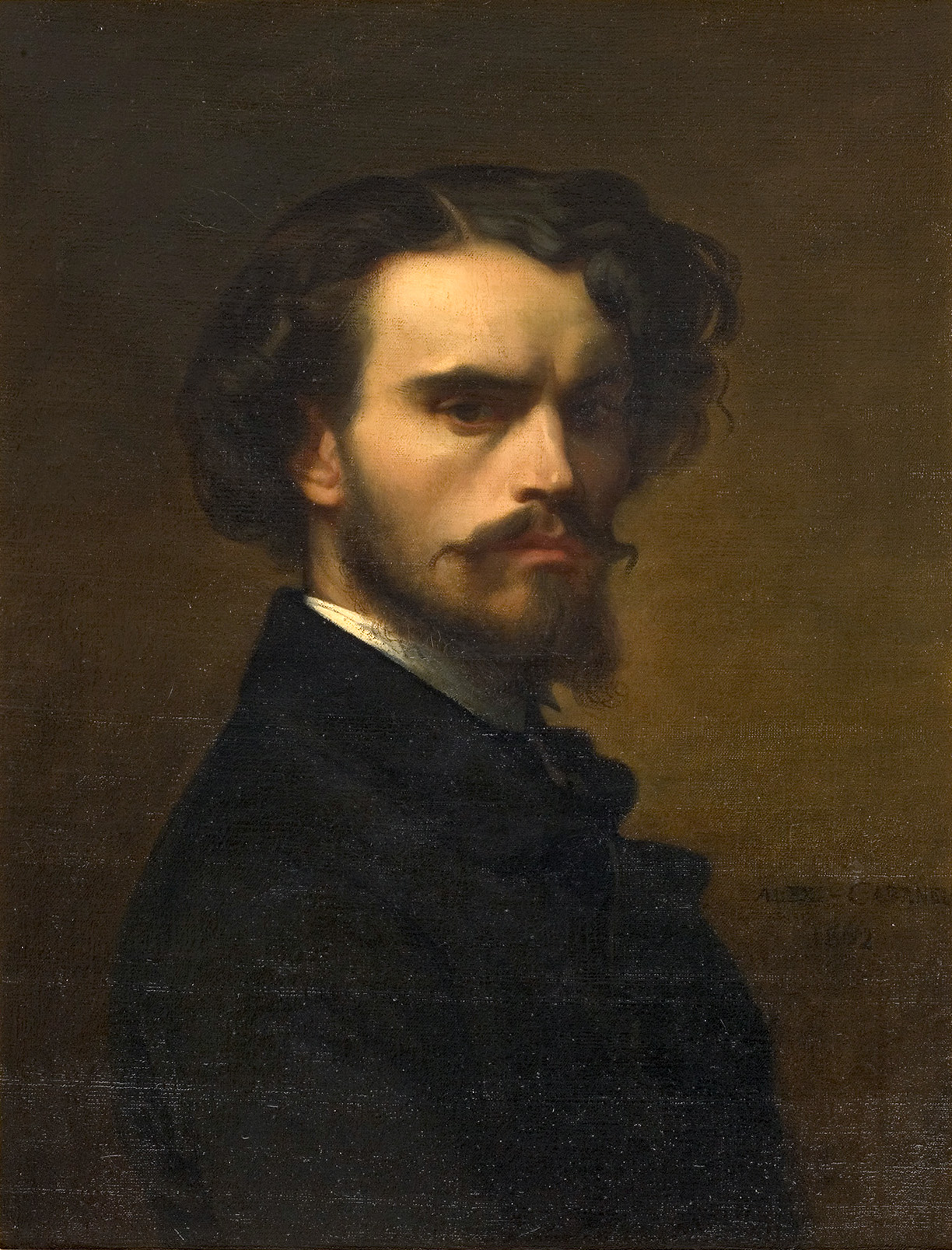
Alexandre Cabanel

Please add names of notable painters with a Wikipedia page, in precise English alphabetical order, using U.S. spelling conventions. Country and regional names refer to where painters worked for long periods, not to personal allegiances.

- Alexandre Cabanel (1823–1889), French painter
- Vincenzo Cabianca (1827–1902), Italian painter
- W. Lindsay Cable (1900–1949), Scottish artist and illustrator
- Francis Cadell (1883–1937), Scottish painter
- James Cadenhead (1858–1927), Scottish painter
- Paul Cadmus (1904–1999), American tempera artist
- Pogus Caesar (born 1953), St Kitts/English photographer, artist and television producer
- Cagnaccio di San Pietro (1897–1946), Italian painter
- Gustave Caillebotte (1848–1894), French painter and patron
- Lawrence Calcagno (1913–1993), American painter
- Alexander Calder (1898–1976), American sculptor
- Alexander Milne Calder (1846–1923), Scottish/American sculptor
- Alexander Stirling Calder (1870–1945), American sculptor
- Mary Callery (1903–1977), American sculptor
- Jacques Callot (1592–1635), Lorraine print-maker and draftsman
- Abraham van Calraet (1642–1722), Dutch painter and engraver
- Luis Enrique Camejo (born 1971), Cuban painter
- David Young Cameron (1865–1945), Scottish painter and etcher
- Mary Cameron (1865–1921), Scottish painter
- Gianfredo Camesi (1940–2025), Swiss painter
- Steven Campbell (1953–2007), Scottish painter
- Thomas Campbell (1790–1858), Scottish/English sculptor
- Jacob van Campen (1596–1657), Dutch artist and architect
- Robert Campin (1375–1444), Flemish/Netherlandish painter
- Govert Dircksz Camphuysen (1623–1672), Dutch painter
- Canaletto (1697–1768), Italian painter of views
- Noe Canjura (1922–1970), Salvadoran/French painter
- Antonio Canova (1757–1822), Italian sculptor
- Cao Buxing (曹不興, 3rd c. AD), Chinese painter
- Cao Zhibai (曹知白, 1271–1355), Chinese painter and bibliophile
- Josef Čapek (1887–1945), Austro-Hungarian/Czechoslovak painter, writer and poet
- Jan van de Cappelle (1626–1679), Dutch painter
- Tom Carapic (born 1939), Yugoslav/Serbian found object artist
- Caravaggio (1573–1610), Italian painter
- Arthur B. Carles (1882–1952), American painter
- Nancy Carline (1909–2004), English painter and sculptor
- Richard Carline (1896–1980), English artist, writer and arts administrator
- Sydney Carline (1888–1929), English landscape painter and war artist
- Carlo Carlone (1686–1775), Italian/German painter and engraver
- Emil Carlsen (1853–1932), Danish/American painter
- John Fabian Carlson (1875–1945), American painter
- Rhea Carmi (born 1942), Israeli/American painter and mixed-media artist
- Nicolas Carone (1917–2010), American artist
- Emile Auguste Carolus-Duran (1838–1917), French painter and art instructor
- Vittore Carpaccio (c. 1460 – 1525), Italian painter
- Jane Carpanini (born 1949), English artist and teacher
- Emily Carr (1871–1945), Canadian artist and writer
- Henry Carr (1894–1970), English painter and war artist
- Thomas Carr (1909–1999), English painter
- Carlo Carrà (1881–1966), Italian painter and futurist
- Annibale Carracci (1557–1602), Italian painter and instructor
- Agostino Carracci (1560–1609), Italian painter, print-maker and art teacher
- Ludovico Carracci (1555–1619), Italian etcher, painter and print-maker
- Eugène Carrière (1849–1906), French painter
- Dora Carrington (1893–1932), English painter and decorative artist
- Joanna Carrington (1931–2003), English artist
- Leonora Carrington (1917–2011), English/Mexican painter and novelist
- Alexander Carse (c. 1770 – 1843), Scottish painter
- Clarence Holbrook Carter (1904–2000), American artist
- Ramon Casas i Carbó (1866–1932), Spanish/Catalan artist and graphic designer
- Jessie Case Vesel (1855–1937), English painter
- Felice Casorati (1883–1963), Italian painter, sculptor and print-maker
- Judy Cassab (1920–2015), Australian painter
- Mary Cassatt (1844–1926), American painter and print-maker
- A. J. Casson (1898–1992), Canadian artist
- Humberto Castro (born 1957), Cuban painter
- Carlos Catasse (1944–2010), Chilean painter
- George Catlin (1796–1872), American painter, writer and traveler
- Patrick Caulfield (1936–2005), English painter and print-maker
- Louis de Caullery (c. 1555 – c. 1621), Flemish painter
- Giovanni Paolo Cavagna (1556–1627), Italian painter
- Bernardo Cavallino (1622–1654), Italian painter and draftsman
- Giorgio Cavallon (1904–1989), Italian/American painter
- Antonio Cavallucci (1752–1795), Italian painter
- Mirabello Cavalori (c. 1520 – 1572), Italian painter
- Roger Cecil (1942–2015), Welsh painter and mixed media artist
- Vija Celmins (born 1938), Latvian/American visual artist and draftsman
- Maximilian Cercha (1818–1907), Polish painter and draftsman
- Avgust Černigoj (1898–1985), Slovenian painter
- Bartolomeo Cesi (1556–1629), Italian painter
- Paul Cézanne (1839–1906), French painter
- Paul Émile Chabas (1869–1937) French painter and illustrator
- Marc Chagall (1887–1985), Russian/French painter, draftsman and illustrator
- George Paul Chalmers (1833–1878), Scottish painter
- Alfred Edward Chalon (1780–1860), Swiss/English painter
- Brenda Chamberlain (1912–1971), Welsh artist, poet and novelist
- Chang Dai-chien (張大千, 1899–1983), Chinese painter
- Chang Sŭngŏp (1843–1897), Korean painter
- Charles Joshua Chaplin (1825–1891), French painter, print-maker and etcher
- Minerva J. Chapman (1858–1947), American painter
- Jean-Baptiste-Siméon Chardin (1699–1779), French painter
- Caroline Chariot-Dayez (born 1958), Belgian painter and philosopher
- Michael Ray Charles (born 1967), American painter
- Sam Charles (1887–1949), American artist, pianist and professor
- Elizabeth Charleston (1910–1987), American painter
- Nicolas Toussaint Charlet (1792–1845), French painter and print-maker
- Evan Charlton (1904–1984), English/Welsh painter
- Felicity Charlton (1913–2009), English/Welsh painter
- Chafik Charobim (1894–1975), Egyptian painter
- Louisa Chase (1951–2016), American painter and print-maker
- William Merritt Chase (1849–1916), American painter
- Théodore Chassériau (1819–1856), Dominican/French painter
- Russell Chatham (1939–2019), American landscape artist and author
- Pierre Puvis de Chavannes (1824–1898), French painter of murals
- Jules Chéret (1836–1932), French painter and lithographer
- Evelyn Cheston (1875–1929), English painter
- Chen Chi (程及, 1912–2005), Chinese/American painter
- Patrick Ching (born 1962), American wildlife artist and conservationist
- Derek Chittock (1922–1986), English painter, cartoonist and art critic
- Chinwe Chukwuogo-Roy (1952–2012), Nigerian/English visual artist
- Chen Chun (陳淳, 1483–1544), Chinese artist
- Chen Hong (陳閎, fl. within 7th–10th cc.) Chinese imperial court painter
- Chen Hongshou (陳洪綬, 1598–1652), Chinese painter
- Chen Jiru (陳繼儒, 1558–1639), Chinese painter, calligrapher and essayist
- Chen Lin (陳琳, c. 1260–1320), Chinese landscape painter
- Chen Lu (陳錄, fl. 14th or 15th c.), Chinese painter
- Chen Rong (陳容, c. 1200–1266), Chinese painter and politician
- Chen Yifei (陳逸飛, 1946–2005), Chinese painter, art director and film director
- Cheng Jiasui (程嘉燧, 1565–1643), Chinese landscape painter and poet
- Cheng Shifa (程十髮, 1921–2007), Chinese calligrapher, painter and cartoonist
- Cheng Zhengkui (程正揆, 1604–1670), Chinese landscape painter and poet
- Billy Childish (born 1959), English painter, writer and musician
- Giorgio de Chirico (1888–1978), Italian artist and writer
- Antonín Chittussi (1847–1891), Austro-Hungarian/Czech painter
- Adam Chmielowski (1888–1878), Polish painter and founder of charitable religious orders
- Daniel Chodowiecki (1726–1801), German painter and print-maker
- Ch'oe Puk (최북, fl. 1755–1785), Korean painter
- Chŏng Sŏn (정선, 1676–1759), Korean landscape painter
- Dan Christensen (1942–2007), American painter
- Henry B. Christian (1883–1953), American painter
- Ernest William Christmas (1863–1918), Australian painter
- Christo (1935–2020), Bulgarian/American conceptual artist
- Petrus Christus (1410–1476), Netherlandish painter
- Abdur Rahman Chughtai (1899–1975), Indian/Pakistani painter
- Frederick Edwin Church (1826–1900), American landscape painter
- Betty Churcher (1931–2015), Australian painter and arts administrator
- Peter Churcher (born 1964), Australian artist
- Winston Churchill (1874–1965), English painter, writer and prime minister
- Leon Chwistek (1884–1937) Austro-Hungarian/Polish painter, critic and philosopher
- Cimabue (1240–1302), Italian painter and designer of mosaics
- Giovanni Battista Cipriani (1727–1785), Italian painter and engraver
- Antonio Ciseri (1821–1891), Swiss/Italian religious painter
- Joze Ciuha (1924–2015), Yugoslav/Slovenian painter
- Mikalojus Konstantinas Čiurlionis (1875–1911), Lithuanian painter, composer and writer
- Franz Cižek (1865–1946), Austrian painter and art education reformer
- George Claessen (1909–1999), Sri Lankan artist
- Pieter Claesz (1597–1660), Dutch still-life painter
- Alson S. Clark (1876–1949), American painter, photographer and art educator
- Edward Clark (1926–2019), American painter and shaped canvas innovator
- Jean Clark (1902–1999), English mural painter
- Walter Leighton Clark (1859–1935), American artist, businessman and inventor
- Joaquín Clausell (1866–1935), Mexican painter, lawyer and politician
- John Clayton (1728–1800), English painter
- Francesco Clemente (born 1952), Italian/American painter, draftsman and sculptor
- Grace Clements (1905–1969), American painter, mosaicist and art critic
- Chuck Close (1940–2021), American photo-realist painter and photographer
- François Clouet (1510–1572), French miniaturist and painter
- Giorgio Giulio Clovio (1498–1578), Croatian/Italian miniaturist and painter
- Henry Ives Cobb, Jr. (1883–1974), American artist and architect
- Juan Fernando Cobo (born 1959), Colombian painter, illustrator and sculptor
- Pieter Codde (1599–1678), Dutch painter
- Charles Codman (1800–1842), American painter
- Isabel Codrington (1874–1943), English watercolor artist
- Jon Coffelt (born 1963), American painter, sculptor and sewer
- Nevin Çokay (1930–2012), Turkish painter and art history teacher
- Dorothy Coke (1897–1979), English war artist and watercolor painter
- Ruth Collet (1909–2001), English painter, illustrator and print-maker
- William Coldstream (1908–1987), English realist painter and art teacher
- Elsie Vera Cole (1885–1967), English painter, engraver and art teacher
- Thomas Cole (1801–1948), American landscape and history painter
- Robert Colescott (1925–2009), American painter and satirist
- Evert Collier (1640–1708), Dutch painter
- John Collier (1850–1934), English artist and writer
- Raphaël Collin (1850–1916), French painter and teacher
- Elisabeth Collins (1904–2000), English painter and sculptor
- Jacob Collins (born 1964), American realist painter
- Samuel Colman (1832–1920), American painter, interior designer and writer
- Jean Colombe (1430–1493), French miniature painter and illuminator
- Giovanni Battista Innocenzo Colombo (1717–1793), Swiss painter and stage-set designer
- Robert Colquhoun (1914–1962), Scottish painter, print-maker and set designer
- Jaime Colson (1901–1975), Dominican modernist painter
- Robert Combas (born 1957), French painter and sculptor
- Mario Comensoli (1922–1993), Swiss painter
- Charles Conder (1868–1909), Australian painter and lithographer
- William Congdon (1912–1998), American/European painter
- Charles Fremont Conner (1857–1905), American painter
- Kevin Connor (1932–2025), Australian painter
- William Conor (1881–1968), Irish/English artist
- John Constable (1776–1837), English landscape painter
- Constant (1920–2005), Dutch painter, sculptor and musician
- Theo Constanté (1934–2014), Ecuadorian abstract painter
- John Kingsley Cook (1911–1994), English artist and wood engraver
- May Louise Greville Cooksey (1878–1943), English painter
- Cassius Marcellus Coolidge (1844–1934), American painter
- A.D.M. Cooper (1856–1924), American painter
- Colin Campbell Cooper (1856–1937), American painter
- Emma Lampert Cooper (1855–1920), American painter
- Adriaen Coorte (1665–1707), Dutch still-life painter
- Constance Copeman (1864–1953), English painter, print-maker and engraver
- John Singleton Copley (1737–1815), American painter
- Teresa Copnall (1882–1972), English painter
- Fern Coppedge (1883–1951), American impressionist painter
- Coppo di Marcovaldo (1225–1276), Italian painter
- Edward Corbett (1919–1971), American abstract painter
- Lovis Corinth (1858–1925), German painter, print-maker and writer
- Mary Corkling (1850–1937), English painter
- Corneille (1922–2010), Dutch artist
- Thomas Cornell (1937–2012), American painter and draftsman
- Paul Cornoyer (1864–1923), American painter
- Jean-Baptiste-Camille Corot (1796–1875), French painter and print-maker
- Correggio (1489–1534), Italian painter
- Pietro da Cortona (1596–1669), Italian painter and architect
- Piero di Cosimo (1462–1521), Italian painter
- Francesco del Cossa (c. 1435 – c. 1477), Italian painter
- Pierre Auguste Cot (1837–1883), French classicist painter
- Colijn de Coter (1440–1532), Netherlandish altarpiece painter
- Jean-Yves Couliou (1916–1995), French painter
- Noel Counihan (1913–1986), Australian painter, print-maker and illustrator
- Glenys Cour (born 1924), Welsh artist
- Gustave Courbet (1819–1877), French realist painter
- Marie Courtois (c. 1605 – 1703), French miniature painter
- Thomas Couture (1815–1879), French history painter and teacher
- John Covert (1882–1960), American painter
- Raymond Teague Cowern (1913–1986), English painter and illustrator
- James Cowie (1886–1956), Scottish portrait painter
- Jan Cox (1919–1980), Dutch/Belgian painter
- Raymond Coxon (1896–1997), English painter and war artist
- Francesco Cozza (1605–1682), Italian painter
- Dirk Crabeth (1501–1574), Dutch glass painter, tapestry designer and cartographer
- Wouter Pietersz Crabeth (1510–1590), Dutch glass painter
- Frank Barrington Craig (1902–1951), English painter and art teacher
- James Humbert Craig (1877–1944), Irish painter
- Lucas Cranach the Elder (1472–1553), German painter, print-maker and engraver
- Lucas Cranach the Younger (1515–1586), German painter
- Lefevre James Cranstone (1822–1893), English/Australian painter
- Hugh Adam Crawford (1898–1982), Scottish portrait painter
- Fred Cress (1938–2009), English/Australian painter
- Susan Crile (born 1942), American painter and print-maker
- Carlo Crivelli (1435–1495), Italian painter
- Ivan Lacković Croata (1932–2004), Yugoslav/Croatian painter
- Charles Crodel (1894–1974), German painter and stained-glass artist
- Ray Crooke (1922–2015), Australian landscape artist
- Jasper Francis Cropsey (1823–1900), American landscape artist
- William Crosbie (1915–1999), Scottish painter
- Henri-Edmond Cross (1856–1910), French painter and print-maker
- Jean Crotti (1878–1958), French painter
- Gonzalo Endara Crow (1936–1996), Ecuadorian painter and writer
- William Crozier (1893–1930), Scottish painter
- Robert Crozier (1815–1891), English portrait artist
- István Csók (1865–1961), Hungarian painter
- Enzo Cucchi (born 1949), Italian painter
- Cui Bai (崔白, fl. 1050–1080), Chinese painter
- Cui Zizhong (崔子忠, died 1644), Chinese painter
- Constance Gordon-Cumming (1837–1924), Scottish painter and travel writer
- Charles Cundall (1890–1971), English topographical painter
- Nora Cundell (1889–1948), English painter
- Rinaldo Cuneo (1877–1939), American painter
- John Steuart Curry (1897–1946), American painter and illustrator
- Frances Currey (1925–2012), American painter
- Aelbert Cuyp (1620–1691), Dutch landscape painter
- Benjamin Gerritsz Cuyp (1612–1652), Dutch landscape painter
- Jacob Gerritsz. Cuyp (1594–1652), Dutch portrait and landscape painter
- Boleslaw Cybis (1895–1957), Polish painter, sculptor and muralist
- Władysław Czachórski (1850–1911), Polish painter
- Józef Czapski (1896–1993), Polish artist, author and army officer
- Szymon Czechowicz (1689–1775), Polish painter
- Alfons von Czibulka (1888–1969), Austro-Hungarian/Czech painter and writer
- Béla Czóbel (1883–1976), Hungarian painter
- Tibor Czorba (1906–1985), Hungarian painter
- Tytus Czyżewski (1880–1945), Polish painter, art theorist and poet
