= Arthur Putnam =

American artist (1873–1930)

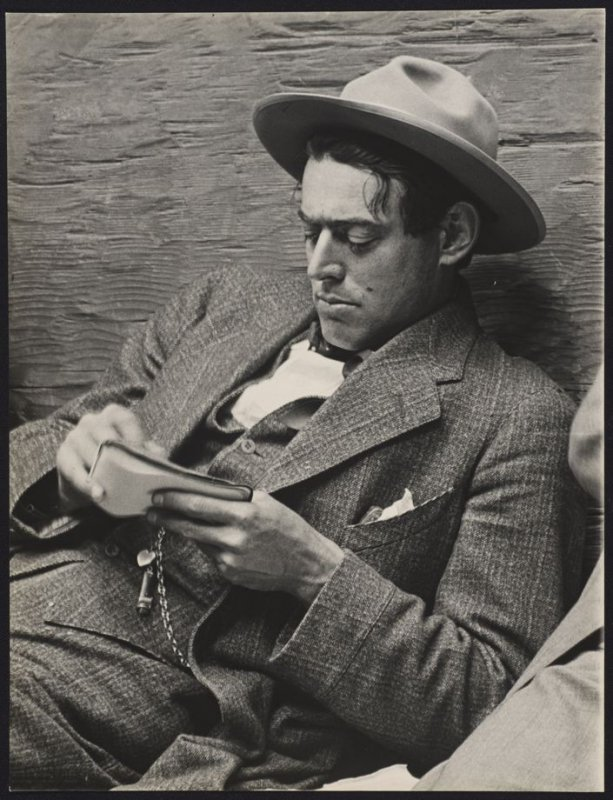
- Arthur Putnam with his sketchpad; photograph by Gabriel Moulin (1872-1945)
- Born: John Gutzon de la Mothe Borglum; September 6, 1873; Waveland, Mississippi
- Died: May 27, 1930 (aged 56)
- Known for: Sculpture

Arthur Putnam (September 6, 1873 – May 27, 1930) was an American sculptor and animalier who was recognized for his bronze sculptures of wild animals. Some of his artworks are public monuments. He was a well-known figure, both statewide and nationally, during the time he lived in California. Putnam was regarded as an artistic genius in San Francisco and his life was chronicled in the San Francisco and East Bay newspapers. He won a gold medal at the 1915 San Francisco world's fair, officially known as the Panama–Pacific International Exposition, and was responsible for large sculptural works that stand in San Francisco and San Diego. Putnam exhibited at the Armory Show in 1913, and his works were also exhibited in New York, Philadelphia, Chicago, Paris, and Rome.

== Early life ==
Putnam was born on September 6, 1873, in Waveland, Mississippi, whilst his family was traveling. He had an older brother, George, born in New Orleans, and a younger sister, Clara Elizabeth, born in Mississippi. Their father, Oramel Hinkley Putnam (1841–1880), was a civil engineer from Vermont and served in the Union Army during the Civil War. Oramel Putnam was a railroad worker, and the family frequently relocated during the sculptor's early years. The Putnams eventually settled in Omaha, Nebraska, for an extended time whilst Putnam was growing up; Putnam enjoyed drawing animals and modeling them in clay during this period. He experienced a serious accident as a child, falling forty feet out of a tree and receiving a head injury. In San Francisco he visited the California Midwinter International Exposition of 1894, took Julie Heyneman’s drawing class at the local Art Students League, and had a short apprenticeship with the sculptor Rupert Schmid. In 1899 Putnam married his first wife, Grace Choate Storey, in Sacramento, California, and moved first to Berkeley, California, and then in 1900 to San Francisco. He worked frequently on commissions for architectural sculpture.

== Scripps commission ==
Putnam received his first major commission from the newspaperman, E. W. Scripps (1854–1926), for the creation of five monumental figures from California history and lore. Putnam's brother, George, worked for Scripps' secretary, and this arrangement led to Putnam visiting the Scripps Ranch at Miramar, where he was awarded the commission. Five works were initially planned for locations on the Scripps estate, and the designs were to be approved by Scripps.

== San Francisco, 1900 to 1921 ==
In San Francisco, Putnam was friends with artist and stained glass designer Bruce Porter (1865–1943) and the tonalist painter Gottardo Piazzoni (1872–1945); these friendships would help sustain the sculptor in the future. He shared a studio with sculptor Earl Cummings (1876–1936), and Piazzoni at 628 Montgomery Street (part of the Montgomery Block, where a number of other artists and bohemians lived). Literary figures such as Jack London (1876–1916) and George Sterling were known to visit the studio. Putnam worked with progressive painters like Maynard Dixon (1875–1946), Matteo Sandona (1881–1964), and Xavier Martínez (1869–1943), all of whom left the San Francisco Art Association and formed the California Society of Artists with Piazzoni and Putnam. The breakaway group organized a single exhibition that was held at Charles Peter Neilson's studio in 1902. In 1905 he traveled first to Rome and then to Paris, where he exhibited six sculptures at the Salon and Auguste Rodin praised him as “a master.” The streetlights at 680–1140 Sutter Street in the Lower Nob Hill district of San Francisco were designed by Putnam with "The Winning of the West" (c. 1908) bases, installed with architects D. H. Burnham & Co. In 1910 he sold his Snarling Jaguar to New York’s Metropolitan Museum of Art.

Neurological problems which began in 1909 led to the removal of a brain tumor in 1911. As a result of the operation, Putnam was paralyzed on his left side and his formal perceptions were impaired. He divorced his wife and in 1917 married Marion Pearson, a woman half his age. Constant demands for new work, especially from the art critic Laura Bride Powers who falsely claimed that Putnam had recovered his talents “by a miracle,” kept him out of the country until his death on May 27, 1930, at Ville d’Avray, France.

Between 1900 and his permanent move to France in 1921 his sculptures were exhibited on more than 25 separate occasions in the San Francisco Bay Area, including venues at the Berkley and San Francisco Art Associations, Bohemian Club, California Palace of Fine Arts, Vickery, Atkins & Torrey Gallery, and the Legion of Honor.

The awards that he received outside of California include an Honorable Mention at the Art Institute of Chicago (1917), the Barnett Prize at New York’s National Academy of Design, the Widener Medal at the Pennsylvania Academy of Fine Arts (1923), and the Avery Prize at the Architectural League of New York (1924).

== Panama–Pacific International Exposition ==
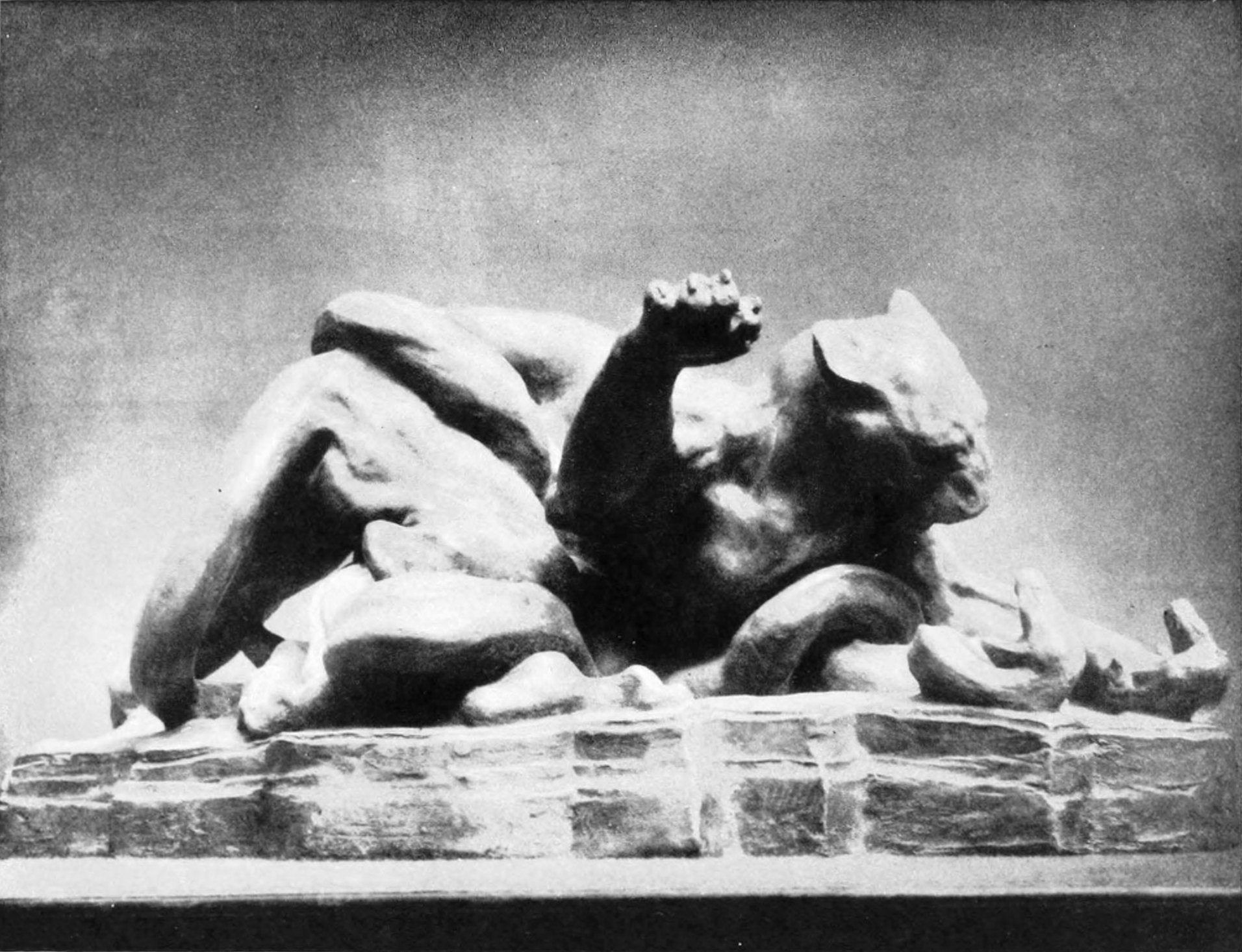
The Puma and the Snake

Putnam's contribution to the Panama–Pacific International Exposition, held February 4 to December 15, 1915, was a mermaid situated in a fountain designed by architect Arthur Brown, Jr. The mermaid was not representative of the sculptor’s earlier work; Putnam had been significantly hampered by a stroke caused by the 1911 surgery. Included in the fair's exhibition galleries was a case containing a selection of Putnam’s bronze sculptures, whilst his bronze group, The Puma and the Snake, was on exhibit in another gallery. These were cast in Rodin’s foundry outside of Paris. The bronze group, which was in the fair's competition for honors, generated positive reviews, with Neuhaus writing that "Arthur Putnam, whose case of animal sculpture is attracting most keen attention, a man for whom the word genius hardly seems too weighty, was awarded a gold medal."

== Rediscovery of the Jack London Writing Tablet ==
The Jack London Writing Tablet, considered to be one of Putnam's most interesting, impressive, and personal works, had faded into obscurity after its presentation at the Children's Pet Exhibition of 1917 in San Francisco. The California redwood sculpture was rediscovered by San Diego antique dealer Christian Chaffee in 1998.

The history of the Jack London piece remains unclear, but it was likely created in 1903. Putnam and Jack London were good friends. The animal depicted in the sculpture has been identified as "Old Buck", the resilient dog from London's major work, The Call of the Wild. Research supported by The Huntington Library confirms that Jack London owned the piece in 1916.

== Collections ==
- The Bohemian Club, San Francisco (Primitive Man)
- Fine Arts Museum of San Francisco, The M.H. De Young Museum
- Fine Arts Museums of San Francisco, Palace of Legion of Honor (Spreckels Collection)
- San Diego Museum of Fine Art, San Diego (Spreckels Collection)
- Boston Museum of Art, Boston (The Death)
- Metropolitan Museum of Art, New York (Snarling Tiger)
- Los Angeles County Museum of Art, Los Angeles (Coyote)
- Portland Art Museum, Portland, Oregon
- Mills College, (The Puma and the Footprint)
- National Museum of Wildlife Art (Puma in Combat with Serpent)
- Oakland Museum of California, Oakland (Puma and Deer and others)
- Crocker Museum, Sacramento, California (Twilight Venus Holding Staff)
- Hood Museum of Art, Dartmouth College (Puma and Snakes)

== Public monuments and sculpture groups ==
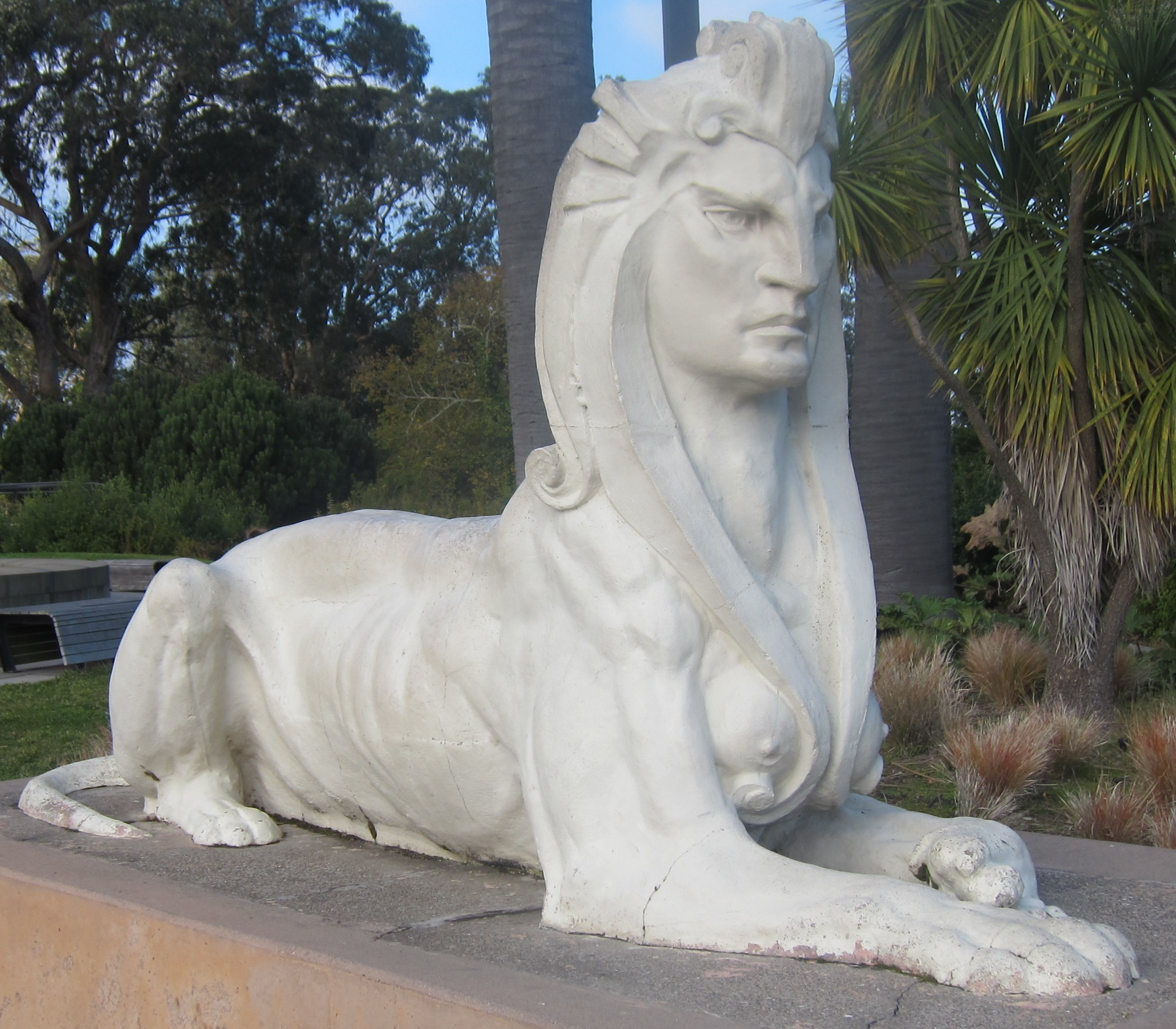
Concrete sphinx in Golden Gate Park, c. 1910

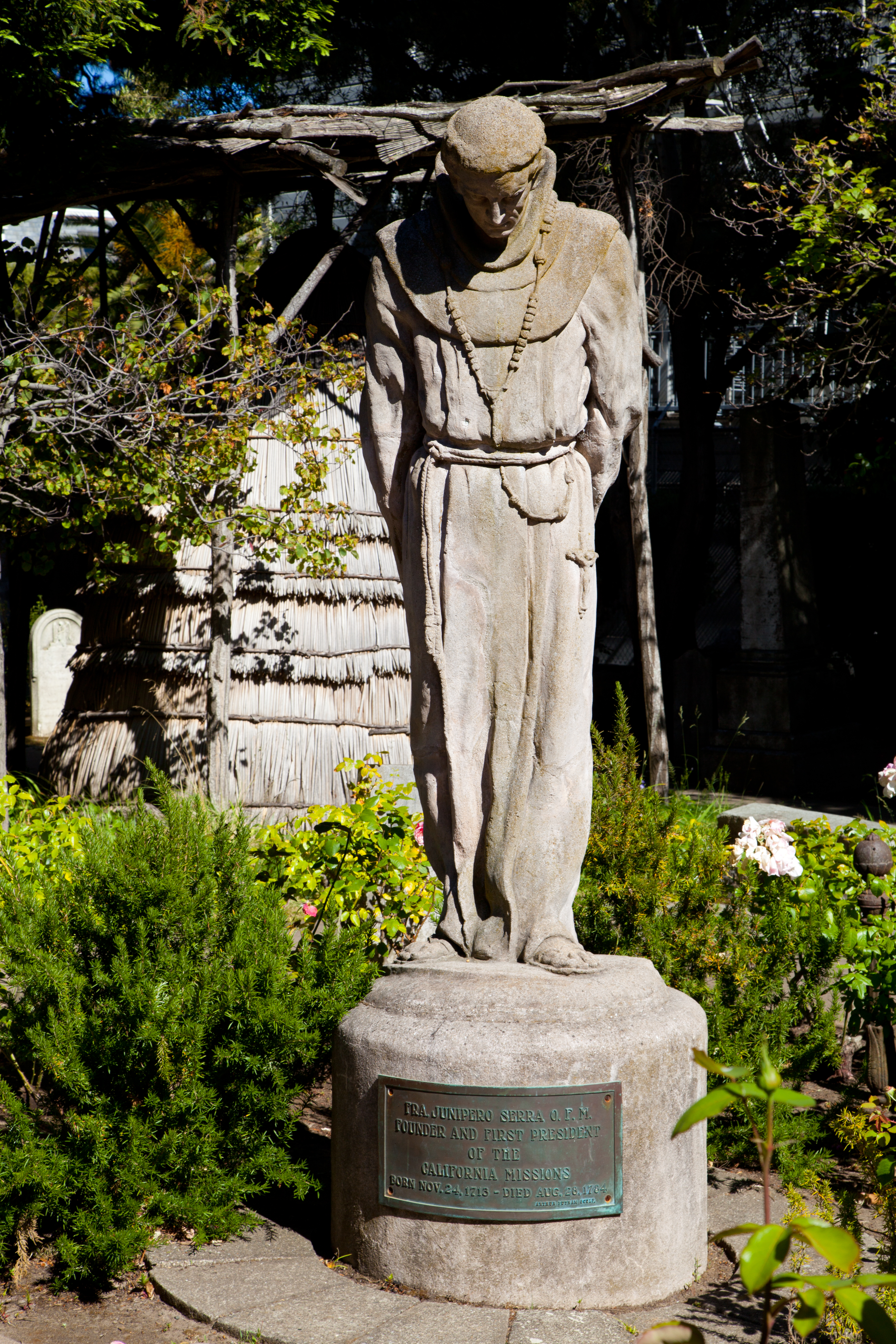
Statue of Junipero Serra at Mission Dolores

- The Indian, Presidio Park, San Diego (1905)
- Sphinx, Golden Gate State Park, San Francisco (1907)
- Nymphs and Satyrs, Plaster Reliefs, Hippodrome Theatre, San Francisco (1907)
- Decorations, Bohemian Club, San Francisco (Willis Polk
- The Padre, Presidio Park, San Diego (1908)
- Winged Angels, Marble, First Unitarian Church, San Francisco (1908)
- Decorations, Bank of California, San Francisco, 1908 (Walter Danforth Bliss, Architect)
- Winning of the West, Light Standard Decoration, San Francisco (Willis Polk, Architect) (1908)
- Sloat Monument, Monterey, California (1908) (Melvin Earl Cummings, architect)
- Two Pumas, Berthold Monument, Monterey (1910)
- The Ploughman, Scripps Institute of Oceanography (1910)
- Lion, Marble, Haddon Hill Development, Oakland (1912)
- Fr. Junipero Serra, Mission Dolores Garden, San Francisco
- Decorative Ceiling, Flood Mansion, (Now Pacific Union Club), San Francisco
- Bas-Relief Decorations, San Francisco Masonic Temple
- Bas-Relief Decorations, San Francisco Examiner Building
- Bas-Relief Decorations, San Francisco Call Building
- Mountain Lions, Crocker National Bank, San Francisco (Willis Polk, Architect)
- Bronzes, Stock Exchange Club, San Francisco Stock Exchange
- Grizzly Bear Cubs, The Fountain, at the Circle, Berkeley, California (John Galen Howard, architect) (1911)
- The Sea Nymph, Fountain, Panama–Pacific International Exposition (1915)
- Bas-Reliefs, Lotta's Fountain, Kearny and Geary Streets, San Francisco (1916)

== Memberships ==
- San Francisco Art Association, San Francisco
- California Society of Artists, San Francisco (founding member, 1902)
- Bohemian Club, San Francisco (1910)
- National Sculpture Society, New York (1913)

== Solo exhibitions ==
- 1923 – Arthur Putnam, Palace of Legion of Honor, San Francisco
- 1930 – Arthur Putnam Memorial Exhibition, Legion of Honor, San Francisco
- 1932 – Arthur Putnam, Legion of Honor, San Francisco
- 1940 – Arthur Putnam, Legion of Honor, San Francisco
- 1945 – Bronzes by Arthur Putnam, Legion of Honor, San Francisco
- 1956 – Arthur Putnam Memorial Exhibition, Legion of Honor, San Francisco
- 1958 – Arthur Putnam Memorial Exhibition, Legion of Honor, San Francisco
- 1978 – Arthur Putnam, Oakland Museum of Art
- 2004 – Arthur Putnam, San Francisco Airport Museum, San Francisco (Works from the Fine Arts Museums of San Francisco)

== Group exhibitions ==
- 1900 – San Francisco Press Club, San Francisco
- 1901 – San Francisco Sketch Club, San Francisco
- 1902 – 1st Annual Exhibition, California Society of Artists, Charles Neilson Studio, San Francisco
- 1903 – Spring Exhibition, Mark Hopkins Institute
- 1906 – Rome International Exposition of Fine Arts
- 1907 – Salon de Societe National des Beaux-Arts, Paris, France
- 1908 – Special Exhibition of Contemporary Art, National Arts Club, New York (Lions)
- 1908 – Bronzes by Group of American Artists, Macbeth Galleries, New York
- 1909 – 104th Annual Exhibition, Pennsylvania Academy of Fine Arts (Sitting Puma)
- 1909 – Architectural Exhibition, Detroit Architecture Club & Detroit Society of Arts & Crafts, Detroit Museum of Art
- 1909 – Bronzes by American Artists Exhibition, Macbeth Galleries, New York
- 1910 – Metropolitan Museum of Art, New York
- 1911 – Small Bronzes, Macbeth Galleries, New York
- 1912 – Inaugural Exhibition, Toledo Museum of Art, Toledo, Ohio (Puma)
- 1913 – International Exhibition of Modern Art (The Armory Show), New York
- 1914 – Paintings and Sculpture, Bohemian Club, San Francisco
- 1915 – Panama–Pacific International Exposition, San Francisco
- 1916 – Sam Francisco Art Association Annual Exhibition, San Francisco (The Ploughman)
- 1916 – Bohemian Club Exhibition, San Francisco
- 1916 – 29th Exhibition of American Paintings and Sculpture, Art Institute of Chicago (Standing Puma, Crouching Coyote, The Combat, Walking Bear, Indian and Puma Wrestling, Coyote and Snake, Listening Puma)
- 1919 – Toby Rosenthal Memorial. Exhibition, California Contemporary Artists, The Palace of Fine Arts, San Francisco (Puma and Deer, Standing Puma, Buffalo Hunt, Skunked Wild Cat)
- 1919 – American Bronzes, Cleveland Museum of Art, December
- 1920 – Pennsylvania Academy of Fine Arts (Puma Lying on its Side)
- 1920 – Fourth Annual Exhibition, Greenwich Society of Artists, Greenwich, Connecticut
- 1921 – San Diego Museum of Art, San Diego
- 1923 – Exhibition of American Sculpture, National Sculpture Society
- 1930 – Palace of Legion of Honor, San Francisco
- 1935 – California-Pacific International Exposition, San Diego, California
- 1939 – Golden Gate International Exposition

== Commercial gallery representation ==
- Hegesen & Marshall, San Francisco
- Macbeth Galleries, New York
- Vickery, Atkins & Torrey, San Francisco

== Sources ==
=== Books and essays ===
- Eugen Neuhaus, The Art of the Exposition, 1916 (complete account of the art sections of the 1915 world’s fair)
- Rose S. Berry, The Dream City: Its Art and Symbolism, No Published Listed, San Francisco, California, 1917 (Gives list of medalist at PPIE)
- Arnold Genthe, As I Remember, John Day, 1936, Page 67-68 (Account of the extent of the artist’s injury)
- Oscar Lewis, Bay Window Bohemia: The Brilliant Artistic World of Gaslit San Francisco, Doubleday and Company, 1956, Pages 233–237 (Account of Putnam’s life)
- Harold Gilliam, The San Francisco Experience, The Wild Animals of Arthur Putnam, Doubleday, 1982, Pages 40–42 (Chapter on Arthur Putnam’s life)
- 100 Years of American Sculpture, Oakland Museum, 1982
- Donald L. Stover, American Sculpture in the Fine Arts Museums of San Francisco, Fine Arts Museum of San Francisco, 1982,( Pages 7, 41, 45)
- Edan Milton Hughes, Artists in California: 1786–1940, Hughes Publishing, 1986, Page 373
- Donald Hagerty, Desert Dreams: The Art and Life of Maynard Dixon, 1998 (Biography of Putnam's friend Maynard Dixon)
- Patti Carr Black, Mississippi Artists, Mississippi Historical Society, 1998 Page 185
- Nancy Dustin Wall Moure, California Art: 450 Years of Painting & Other Media, Dustin Publications, 1998, Page 113
- Peter Booth Wiley, National Trust Guide – San Francisco Guide for Architecture and History Travelers, John Wiley and Sons, 2000, Pages 157–158 (Notes on buildings and monuments that Putnam contributed to)
- Chaffee, Christian, Arthur Putnam Timeline, Jack London Tablet Website
- Jeffrey E. Morseburg, Arthur Putnam: The Trials, Tragedy and Triumphs of a California Sculptor, Essay, 2010 (Extended Biographical Essay)

=== Newspaper articles ===
- Art Notes, New York Times, June 14, 1903
- Notes of the Art Galleries, New York Times, December 17, 1911 (Mentions “Puma” and “Snarling Jaguar” in Macbeth exhibition)
- Laura Bride Powers, Arthur Putnam, Genius of the West Leaves for Paris Next Week, Oakland Tribune, May 22, 1921, Page 4

=== Periodicals ===
- Mark Hopkins Review of Art, Spring Exhibition, Mark Hopkins Institute of Art, San Francisco, California, 1903, Page 18 (Reproduction of Tiger and Snake)
- J. Mayne, A Splendid Piece of Bronze Work, Granite Marble and Bronze, A. M. Hunt, Company, Boston, Massachusetts, Page 35 (Reproduction of Southern California Indian)
- J. Mayne, The Typical American Indian in Bronze: Work of a Young California Sculptor, The Craftsman, Gustav Stickley, Editor and Publisher, Syracuse, New York, Volume 9, October 1905-March, 1906, Page 251 (Article on the commission for Mr. Scripps)
- Lucy Baker Jerome, Animals Trapped in Plaster, Sunset Magazine, Southern Pacific Company, May, 1908 Pages 255–256 (Article on Putnam’s work)
- William Macbeth, Art Notes, Macbeth Gallery, New York, New York, December 1909, Pages 615–616 (Mentions visiting Putnam in California and how he does his own foundry work.)
- Arthur Putnam, Art and Decoration, May, 1915, Page 288 (Mentions the late arrival of his bronzes)
- Michael Williams, Western Art at the Exposition, Sunset Magazine, Sunset Pacific Company, August, 1915, Page 318 (Survey of the Exposition that mentions Putnam prominently)
- California Sculpture, California’s Magazine, California’s Magazine Company, San Francisco, Volume 11916, Page 42 (Extensive discussion of Putnam’s work)
- American Magazine of Art, November, 1917, Page 280 (Review of exhibition with mention of excellence of Putnam’s work)
