= Comensoli =

Comensoli is a surname. Notable people with the surname include:

- Geltrude Comensoli (1847–1903), Italian saint
- Mario Comensoli (1922–1993), Swiss painter
- Peter Comensoli (born 1964), Australian Catholic bishop
