= Viola Patterson =

Viola Patterson (1898–1984), née Hansen, was an American artist who lived and worked in Seattle, WA.

== Life ==
The daughter of a Swedish mother and a Danish father, Viola Hansen Patterson was a graduate of Lincoln High School in Seattle and completed a master program in librarianship at the University of Washington in 1921. Despite her early interest in art making, it was not until the summer after completing her B.A. that she took her first drawing class with Ambrose Patterson, a well-established painter and art professor at the University of Washington whom she eventually married in 1922. Together, they worked in Ambrose Patterson's studio in Seneca Street, where they received visits from local and international artists, and traveled extensively though Europe and Mexico to study and paint. The first woman born in Seattle to study art in Paris, Viola Hansen Patterson met and studied with some of the most prominent modernist artists of her time, including Mexican muralists Pablo O'Higgins and Diego Rivera, French purists Amedee Ozenfant and Paul Bonifas, Russian constructivist Alexander Archipenko, cubists Lyonel Feininger and Andre L'Hote, and American Expressionist Mark Tobey. She taught children's classes at the University of Washington and in conjunction with the Seattle Art Museum from 1947 to 1966. She showed her work in numerous exhibitions in Washington (including at the Seattle Art Museum and the Zoë Dusanne Gallery ), Oregon, and New York. Her last retrospective was in 1968 at the Henry Art Gallery. She died in her Laurelhurst home in 1984 at the age of 86. Her work was displayed at the Gates Center at the University of Washington and at the Museum of Northwest Art.

== Sources ==
- Danielle Marie Knapp, Rethinking Ambrose Patterson and Modern Art in Seattle, University of Oregon, June 2010
