= Ogura Yonesuke Itoh =

American painter

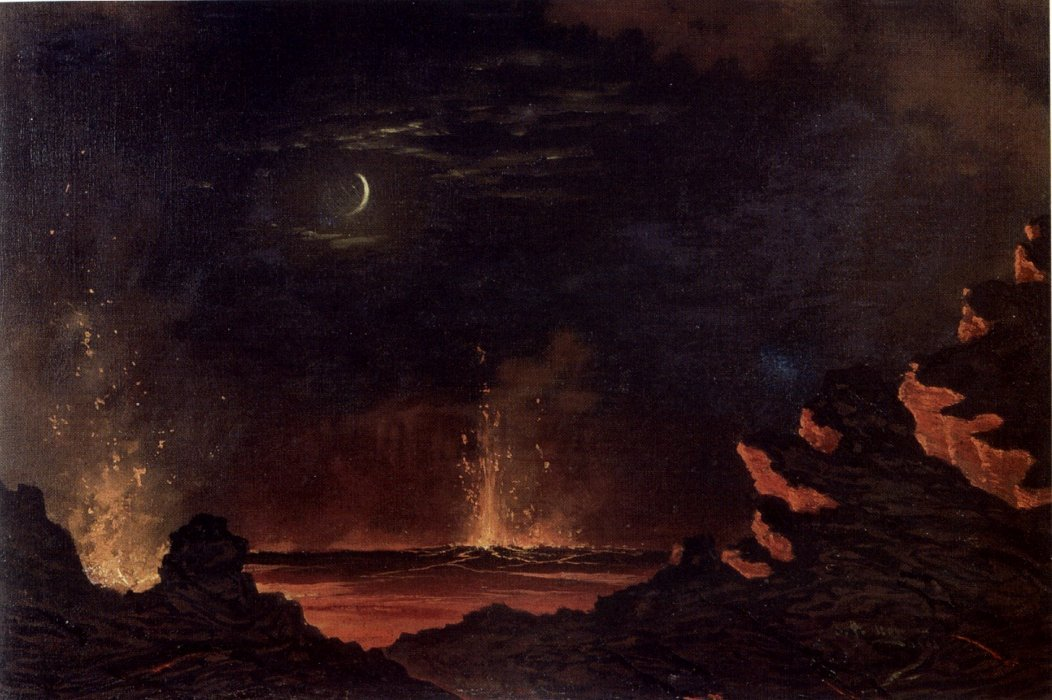
Kilauea, oil on canvas painting by Ogura Yonesuke Itoh, 1908, Honolulu Museum of Art

Ogura Yonesuke Itoh (1870–1940) was a Japanese-American artist. He was born in Japan in 1870. At 25 years of age, he jumped ship in Hawaii and hid from the authorities in Punchbowl Crater. He became a member of Hawaii’s volcano school of landscape painters. Ogura is considered to be the first ethnically Japanese painter of any stature to paint Hawaiian subjects. His paintings closely resemble those of Jules Tavernier. Itoh left many of his paintings unsigned, possibly because he was in Hawaii illegally, and some of these unsigned paintings have been incorrectly attributed to Tavernier. Ogura died in 1940.

The Honolulu Museum of Art usually has at least one painting by Ogura Yonesuke Itoh on display with other examples of the volcano school.
