= Eduardo Lefebvre Scovell =

British painter

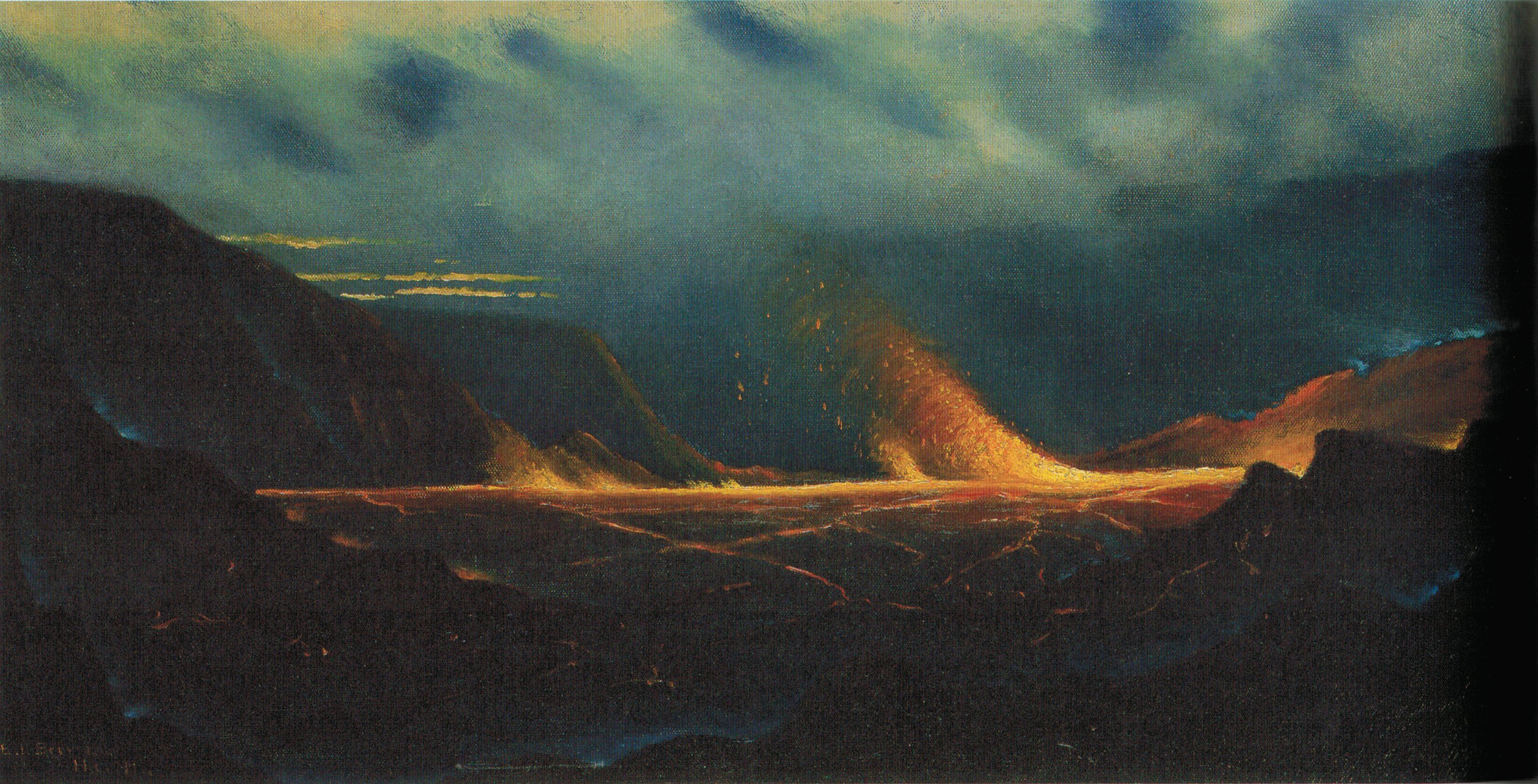
Kilauea, oil on canvas painting by Eduardo Lefebvre Scovell, c. 1890

Eduardo Lefebvre Scovell (1864–1918) was a British artist. He is one of the Volcano School, a group of non-native artists who painted dramatic nocturnal scenes of Hawaii's erupting volcanoes.

Following his education at Eton College and the University of Cambridge, Scovell studied art in Paris. He then traveled extensively, including one year in Rome and Florence. Several years were spent in India, China and Japan. He visited Brazil and spent eight years in Hawaii where he specialized in volcano scenes. He was in San Francisco during the earthquake and fire of 1906 and then settled in Los Angeles. Scovell was a resident there until his death on 23 September 1918.

Scovell's painting Kilauea is in the Bernice P. Bishop Museum in Honolulu.
