= Patrick Ching =

American writer and artist

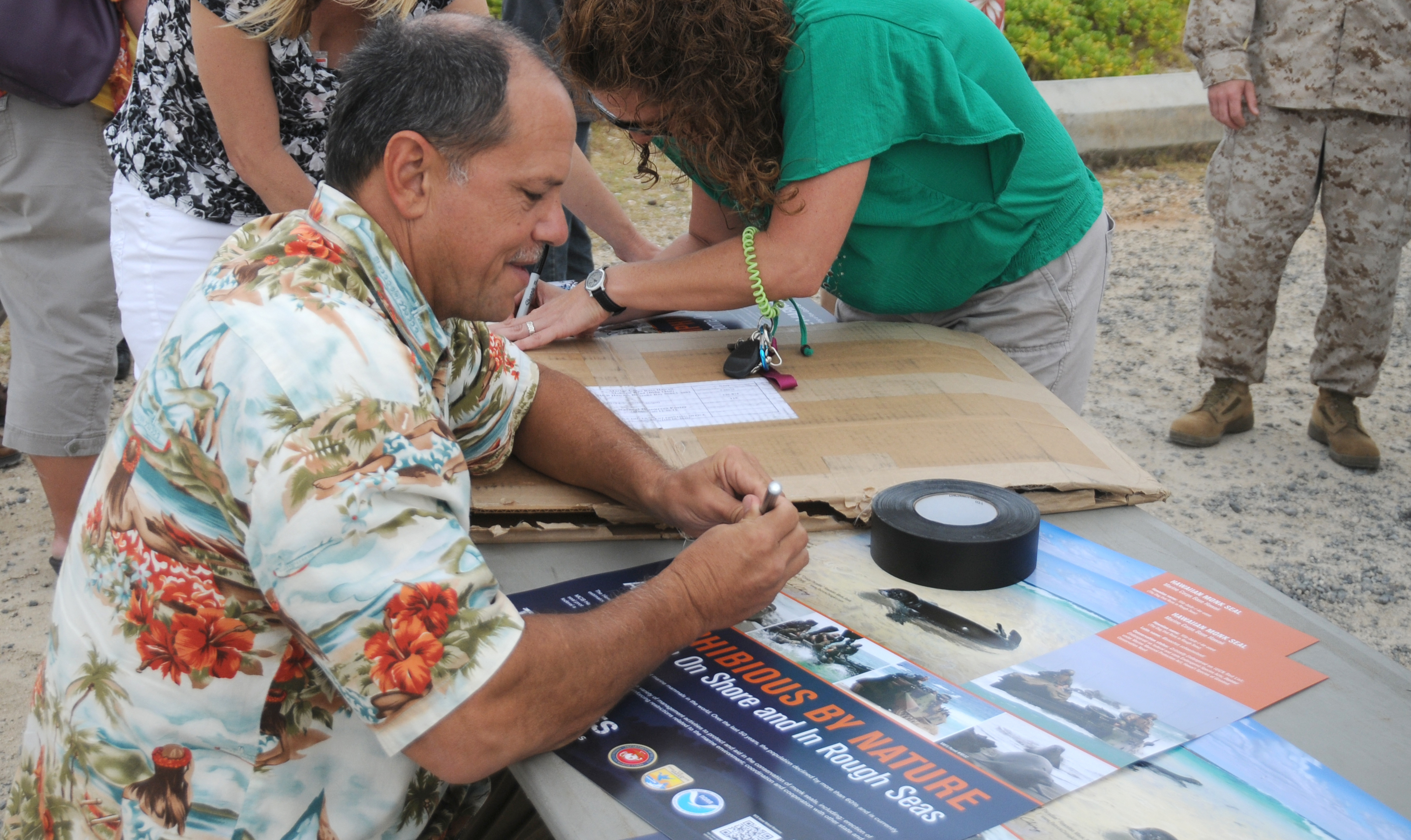
- Ching autographing copies of a newly released poster featuring Marine Corps Base Hawaii efforts to protect Hawaiian monk seals during an unveiling ceremony, May 23, 2012
- Born: c. 1963 (age 62–63); Oahu, Hawaii, United States
- Education: Otis College of Art and Design

Patrick Ching (born c. 1963) is a Hawaiian conservationist and wildlife artist, ornithological illustrator, and author of children's books.

== Early life ==
Ching was born in Oahu. He received his alma mater from the Otis College of Art and Design where he trained to be an artist. In 1984 he moved to Kauai in order to do volunteer for the United States Fish and Wildlife Service as a wildlife ranger. This took him to remote areas of the Hawaiian Islands where he worked a great deal with sharks, seals, turtles and other marine animals. He then became a ranger at the Kilauea Point National Wildlife Refuge.

== As a painter ==
A painter since age 16, Ching gained international recognition because of his painting's remarkable likeness to the photographs he took while in the field. His most notable works of art can be seen on Hawaii's first Wildlife Conservation Stamp featuring the Hawaiian state bird the Nene, a species of goose endemic to the Hawaiian Islands. and the Hawaiian Telcom Phone Book Cover featuring Halley's Comet.

In 2008, Ching painted the hundred foot mural for the Salt Lake Public Library. which was featured in national magazines including Wildlife Art News, Audubon, and Birders' World.

Works by Ching are included in the collections of Hawaii's Bishop Museum and the Smithsonian Museum in New York.

== As an author ==
Ching has written around twenty books, most of which are about wildlife and nature. In 1998 Ching started writing children's books.

== Art Gallery ==
In 1996, Patrick opened the Naturally Hawaiian Gallery from the ruins of an old gas station in the heart of Waimānalo, and in 2008, Patrick Ching Art Gallery opened in Princeville, Kauaʻi.

== Publications ==
Ching has written around twenty books, among them are:

- Honu and Hina: A Story of Coexistence
- How Fo Surf Bettah (2010)
- The Tale of Rabbit Island (2001)
- Sea Turtles of Hawaiʻi (2001)
- The Story of Hina (1998)
- Endangered Animals of Hawaiʻi (1995)
- The Hawaiian Monk Seal (1994)
- The Beautiful Birds of Hawaii (1992)
- Native Animals of Hawaiʻi (1988)
- Exotic Animals in Hawaiʻi

== See also ==
- List of artists who painted Hawaii and its people
