= Peter Booth Wiley =

American academic

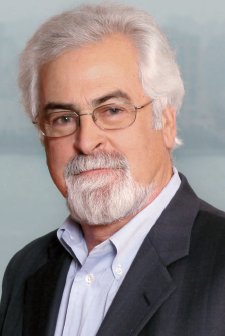
- Born: 1942 (age 83–84)
- Education: University of Wisconsin-Madison; Williams College

Peter Booth Wiley (born 1942) has served as Chairman of the Board of John Wiley & Sons since 2002 and has been a member of the board since 1984. He represents the sixth generation of Wileys to have a leadership role at the company.

== Biography ==
Wiley received a B.A. in English literature from Williams College in Williamstown, and an M.A. in United States history from the University of Wisconsin–Madison.

He is Chairman of the Library and Technology Advisory Council for the California Polytechnic University at San Luis Obispo and serves on the Board of Directors of the University of California Press. He served on Board of Directors of the Friends of the San Francisco Public Library (1996-2013) and chaired its Development Committee during the successful Neighbor Library Campaign that led to the remodeling of branch libraries and the construction of new branches. He has lectured on the history and future of publishing, San Francisco history and architecture, and the writing experience.

As an author, he has published several books, including National Trust Guide: San Francisco 'America's Guide for Architecture and History Travelers, Yankees in the Land of the Gods: Commodore Perry and the Opening of Japan and Empires in the Sun: The Rise of the New American West.
