= Charles Furneaux =

American painter

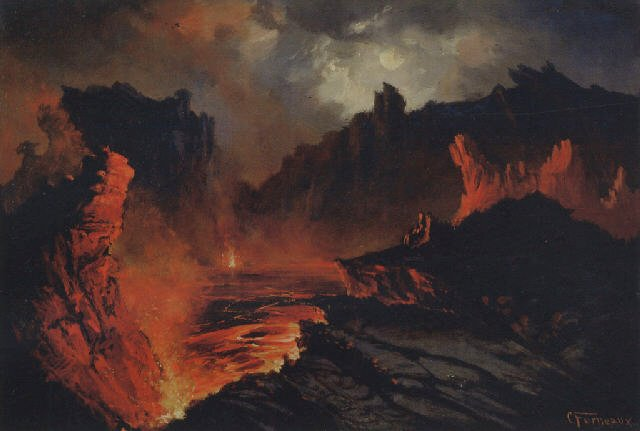
Kilauea, oil on panel

Charles Furneaux (1835–1913) was an American landscape and portrait painter, photographer and educator. He is best known for his paintings in Hawaii, especially those of erupting volcanoes. Much of his work focused on depictions of Kilauea. He is considered a figure in the Volcano School.

== Life and career ==
He was born in 1835, in Boston. For many years he lived in the town of Melrose, Massachusetts. He became a drawing instructor and exhibited in that area.

In 1880, Furneaux moved to the Kingdom of Hawaii, where he cultivated the friendship of King Kalakaua and other members of the Hawaiian royal family, from whom he later received several commissions. While living in Honolulu he taught at the private schools Punahou and Iolani School (then known as St. Alban's College). In 1885, he received the order of Chevalier of Kapiolani from King Kalakaua in 'recognition of his services in advancing Hawaiian art'.

Furneaux moved to Hilo around 1888 and served as an American consular agent there until the annexation of Hawaii in 1898.

In 1893 his home was destroyed in a fire, which may be the reason that many of his paintings cannot be found. Furneaux painted much less later life due to declining eyesight, but remained interested in photography. Late in his life he moved to Olaa where he grew coffee and bananas. He died in Olaa on November 7 1913.

== Works, Collections and Sales ==
Like many artists of the period, Furneaux made his living by portrait commissions. He was commissioned to paint a portrait of Queen Kapi'olani in her coronation robes, which is now held in 'Iolani Palace. Other figures commissioned by Furneaux include then-governor of Kaua'i Paul Kanoa, Prime Minister Walter M Gibson, King Kalakaua's minister of foreign affairs, and Chief Justice of the Supreme Court of Hawaii Albert Francis Judd.

In the late 1880s, he was commissioned in Honolulu by Alexander Joy Cartwright, widely credited as the "father of baseball" and another dear friend of King Kalakaua, to paint the only oil portrait of his 72-year life.

The Bishop Museum (Honolulu), the Lyman Museum (Hilo), the Honolulu Museum of Art, Iolani Palace (Honolulu), and the Mount Holyoke College Art Museum are among the public collections holding Hawaiian landscape works mainly Volcano School by Charles Furneaux.

The auction record for a painting by Charles Furneaux is $17,260. This record was set by Kilauea, a 16 by 24 inch oil painting on canvas sold Oct. 28, 1999 at Christie's (Los Angeles).

== Gallery ==
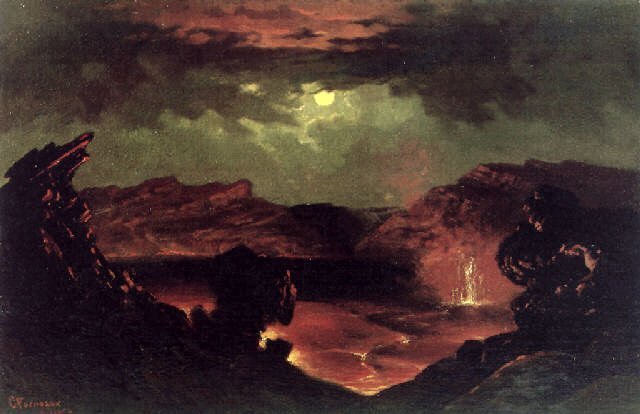
'Kilauea'

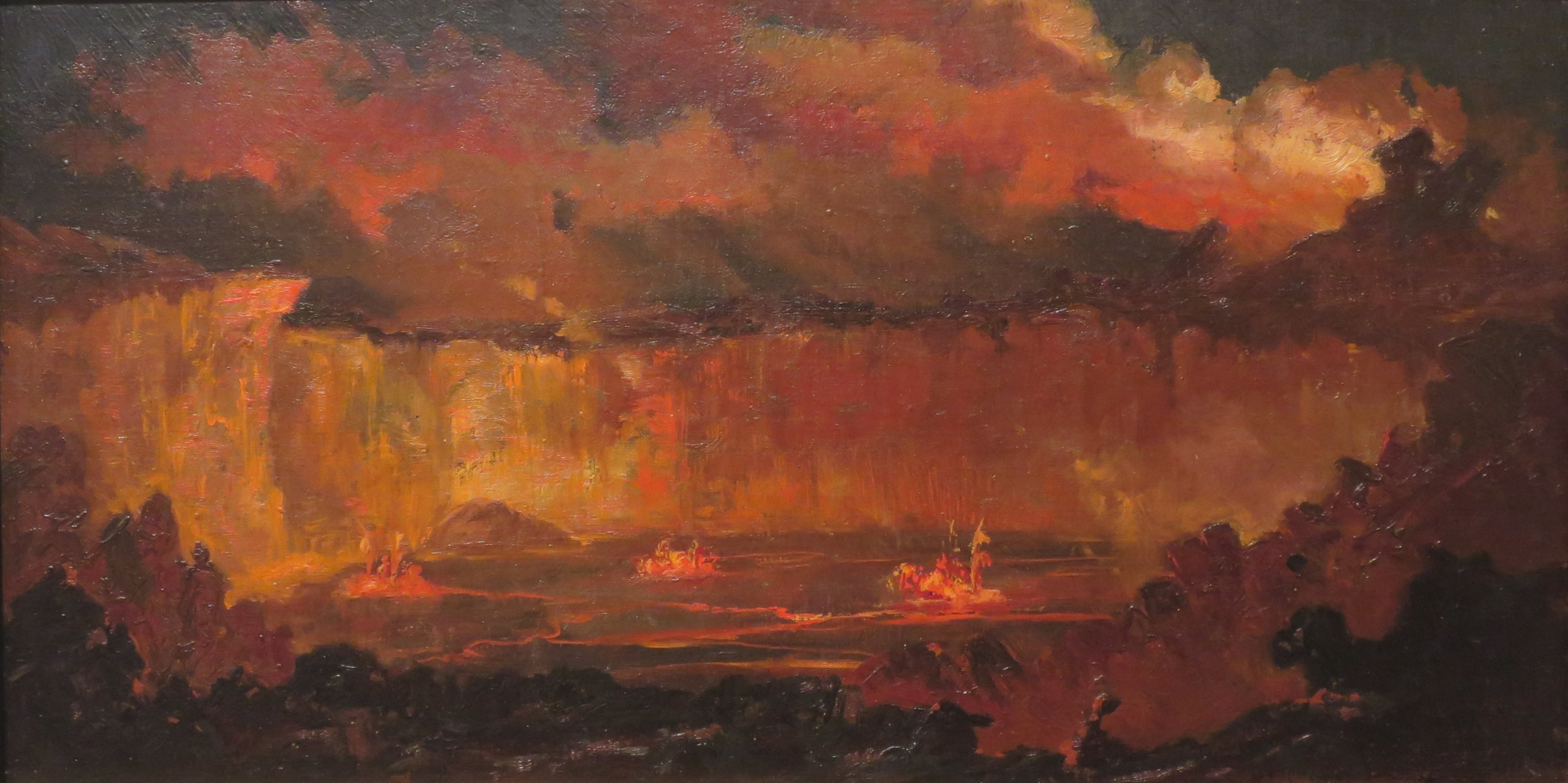
'New Lake, Kilauea', 1880

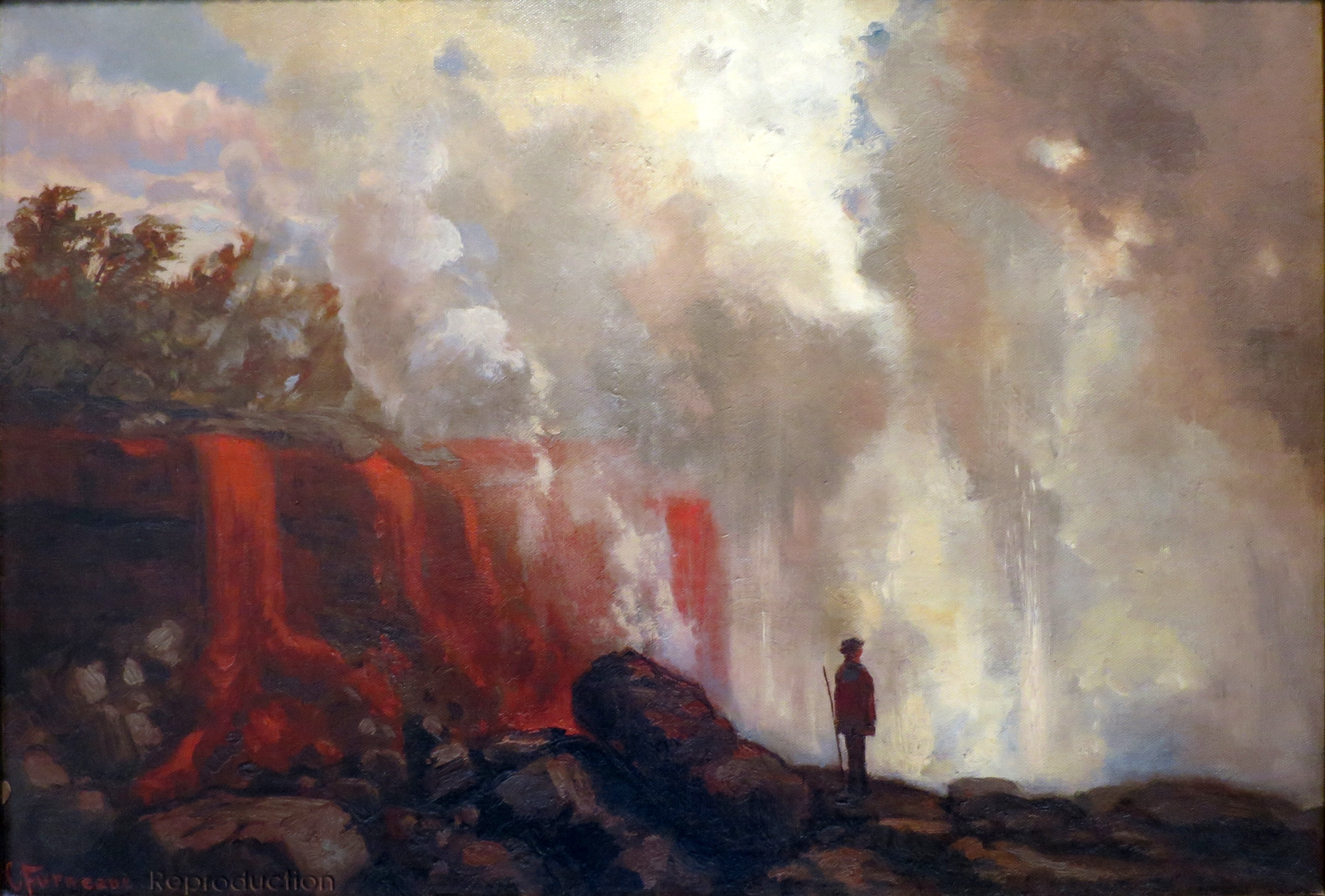
'Man Watching Volcano Lava Falls', 1889

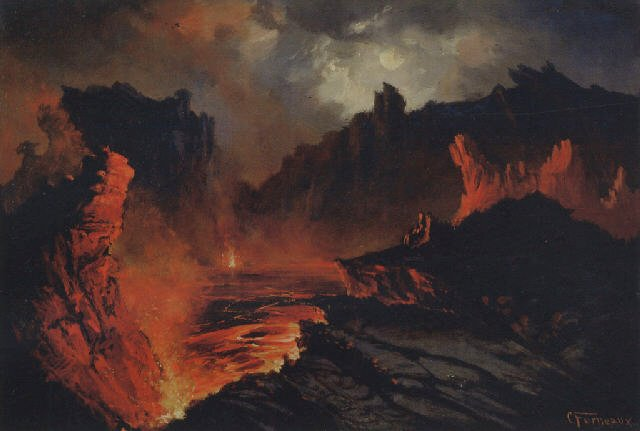
'Kilauea'

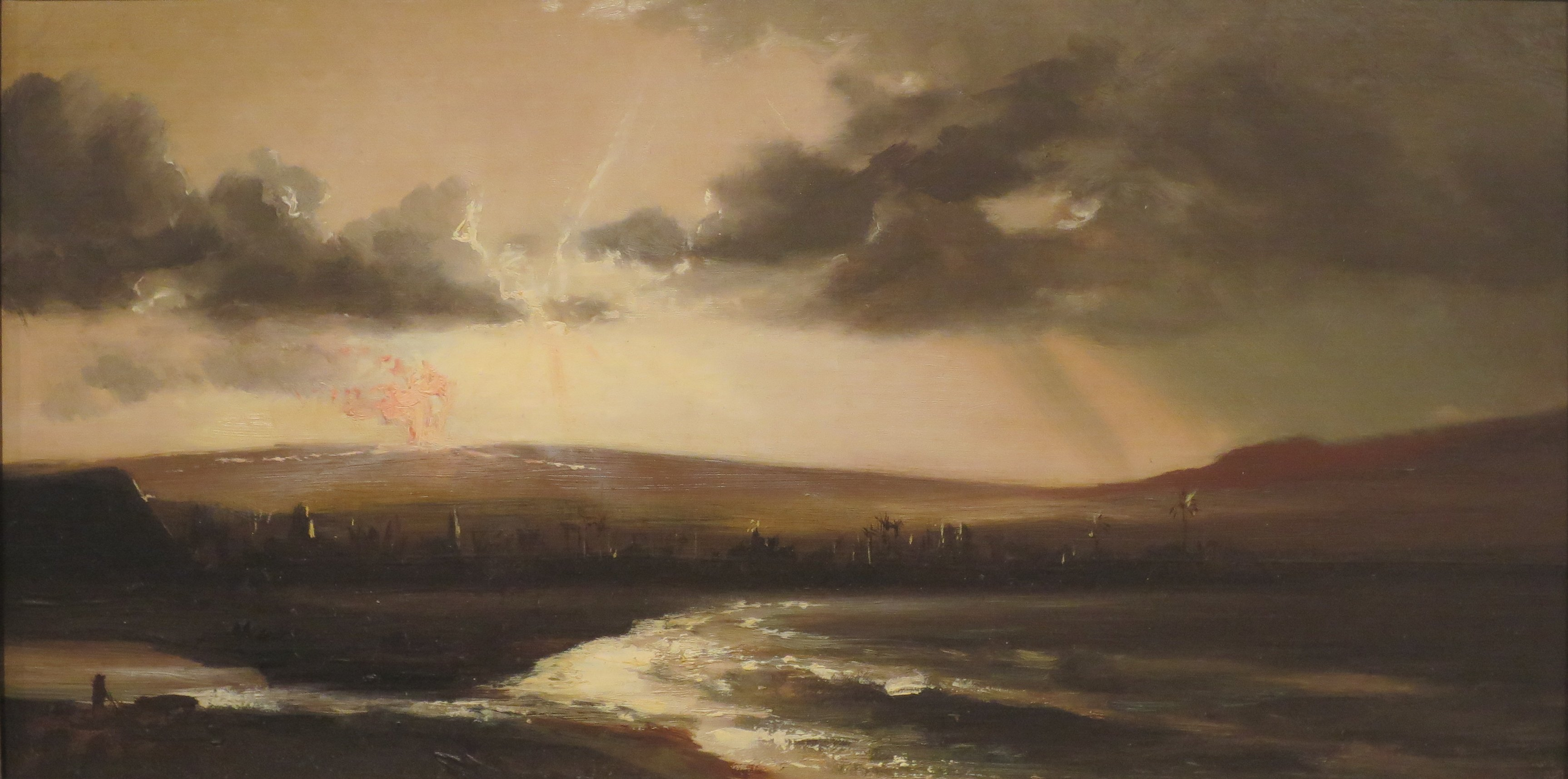
'Volcanic Lightning as Seen from Hilo Beach'
