= Ralph Burke Tyree =

American artist (1921–1979)

- Born: June 30, 1921
- Died: January 15, 1979 (aged 57)

Local Girl, oil on canvas painting by Ralph Burke Tyree, c. 1950

Ralph Burke Tyree (June 30, 1921 – January 15, 1979) was an American artist of the 20th century who had a prolific career painting scenes from the South Pacific. His love of the islands was sparked as a U.S. Marine during World War II when he was posted to Samoa. After the war, he split his years between California and the Pacific, depicting landscapes and exoticized Pacific Islander people in oil on board and black velvet.

Career Tyree was born in Irvine, Kentucky and moved to Delhi, California as an infant. He was awarded a scholarship to the California College of the Arts (Oakland) for a portrait he painted of his future wife, Marguerite (Margo) Almeida and also studied at the San Francisco School of Fine Arts. Seven weeks after the Japanese attack on Pearl Harbor he joined the Marines. He trained at the base in San Diego before being shipped off to Samoa in the summer of 1942. Private Tyree was befriended by his Commanding General, Charles F.B. Price and became the Marine-base artist in Samoa. His portrait art career began by painting the officers and their loved ones, while corresponding with art infused love letters to his girlfriend Margo back home in Turlock, California. He returned to San Diego in April, 1944 and was stationed at Camp Pendleton, Oceanside, CA . On June 27, 1945, Tyree married Margo. He was discharged from the service on January 24, 1946.Soon after Tyree started his family, and began his professional art career in central California. He and his family (Margo and eventually, seven children) traveled back to the South Pacific to live for years in places such as: Guam (1952–55), Oahu (1956–58), Maui (1964–65), and the Big Island of Hawaii (1968–1971). Often, from there, he would travel to other pacific islands: Palau, Fiji, Tahiti, Samoa, and the Solomon Islands over his thirty-year career. He is best known for his nude and semi-nude paintings of women of the Pacific islands. Most of his first works were sensualized Pacific Islander women in tropical beach and forest settings. He painted primarily with oils on board but also occasionally on canvas and with pastels. To add depth and texture, he switched in mid-career (1960) to painting with oils on fine, French silk, black velvet. This was in the midst of the 1960s' Tiki revolution and many of his nude pieces would be displayed in Tiki bars and restaurants. In the 1970s, he started painting endangered animals to call attention to their limited numbers. Burke Tyree died at age 57 of a heart attack at his home in Crows Landing, California. During his career it is estimated that he painted more than 3,000 different pieces.
