= Ambrose McCarthy Patterson =

Australian-American painter

- Self-portrait (La Fenêtre de l'atelier) (c. 1902)
- Born: 29 June 1877; Daylesford, Victoria, Australia
- Died: 26 December 1966 (aged 89); Seattle, Washington, USA
- Known for: Painting and printmaking

Ambrose McCarthy Patterson (29 June 1877 – 26 December 1966) was an Australian-born American painter and printmaker.

== Life ==
Patterson was born in Daylesford, Victoria. He studied at the Melbourne Art School under E. Phillips Fox and Tudor St. George Tucker, at the National Gallery Art School in Melbourne and continued his studies in Paris at the Académie Colarossi and the Académie Julian under Lucien Simon, André Lhote and Maxime Maufra. In Paris he became a friend of compatriot Nellie Melba, the famous soprano; Patterson's brother, Tom, was married to Melba's sister, Belle. Through Melba's influence, he was able to continue his studies with John Singer Sargent. He became part of the Paris arts scene and exhibited at the first Salon d'Automne exhibitions. He had five paintings at the 1905 Paris Salon at which Henri Matisse and the fauves stunned the art world.

He arrived in Hawaii in 1916 on a stopover from Sydney to New York, and decided to stay with a Parisian friend living in Honolulu. During the next 18 months, Patterson made block prints and paintings with particular interest in Kilauea. His art was included in the Hawaiian Society of Artists Annual in 1917. He left for California in 1918 and settled in Seattle. At the 1918 Spring Annual of the San Francisco Art Association (SFAA) his wood block prints were said to be "especially fine in color." That summer his art was given a one-man exhibition at the SFAA galleries and he contributed three colour prints (The Steeple Chase, The Bull Fight, and The Long Beach) to the Seventh Annual of the California Society of Etchers.

By September 1918 Patterson had moved to Seattle to work as a freelance artist, perhaps being the first modern artist in that city, and that fall his art was given a solo show at the Seattle Fine Arts Society, the first of many exhibitions in Washington State. In 1919 he established the University of Washington School of Painting and Design. Patterson married painter and former student Viola Hansen in 1922, and the two became major figures of the arts in the Pacific Northwest region. Patterson taught until his retirement in 1947. He died in Seattle in 1966 leaving behind an impressive record of awards received and exhibitions across the United States, including the: Art Institute of Chicago, Museum of Modern Art in New York City, National Gallery of Art in Washington, D.C., and the World's Fairs in San Francisco and New York City.

The Art Gallery of New South Wales (Sydney, Australia), the Honolulu Museum of Art, the National Portrait Gallery (Australia) (Canberra), the Philadelphia Museum of Art, the Seattle Art Museum and the Tacoma Art Museum are among the public collections holding works by Ambrose McCarthy Patterson.

== Gallery ==
Wood block print Surfriders, Honolulu, c. 1915

A painting at the Allen Center, University of Washington

The Works Progress Administration mural Local Pursuits at the Mount Vernon Post Office, 1938
