= Matteo Sandonà =

American painter (1881–1964)

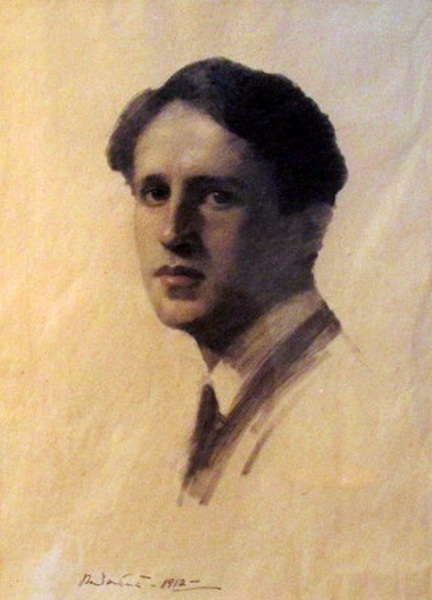
Self-portrait, by Matteo Sandonà, 1912

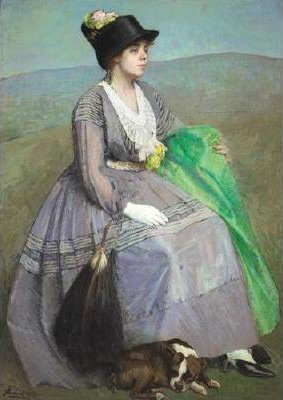
Gertrude and Boots, 1914

Matteo Sandonà (1881–1964) was a painter born in Schio, Italy and raised in the Alps. He immigrated with his family to New Jersey in 1894. Two years later he returned to Europe for four years of study at the Academy of Fine Arts, Verona and in Paris under Napoleone Nani and Mose Bianchi. After returning to the United States, he took further training at the National Academy of Design. In 1901, he and his father settled in San Francisco. Sandonà co-founded the California Society of Artists in 1901. In 1903, he made the first of several trips to Hawaii, where he painted portraits of the territory’s elite.

Sandonà is best known for his luxurious thickly impastoed society portraits. The Honolulu Museum of Art, the Oakland Museum of California (Oakland, California), the Fine Arts Museums of San Francisco, and the Springville Museum of Art (Springville, Utah) are among the public collections holding work by Matteo Sandonà. In 1903 he painted various members of the Kawananakoa family, princes of Hawai'i.
