= William Pinkney Toler =

American painter

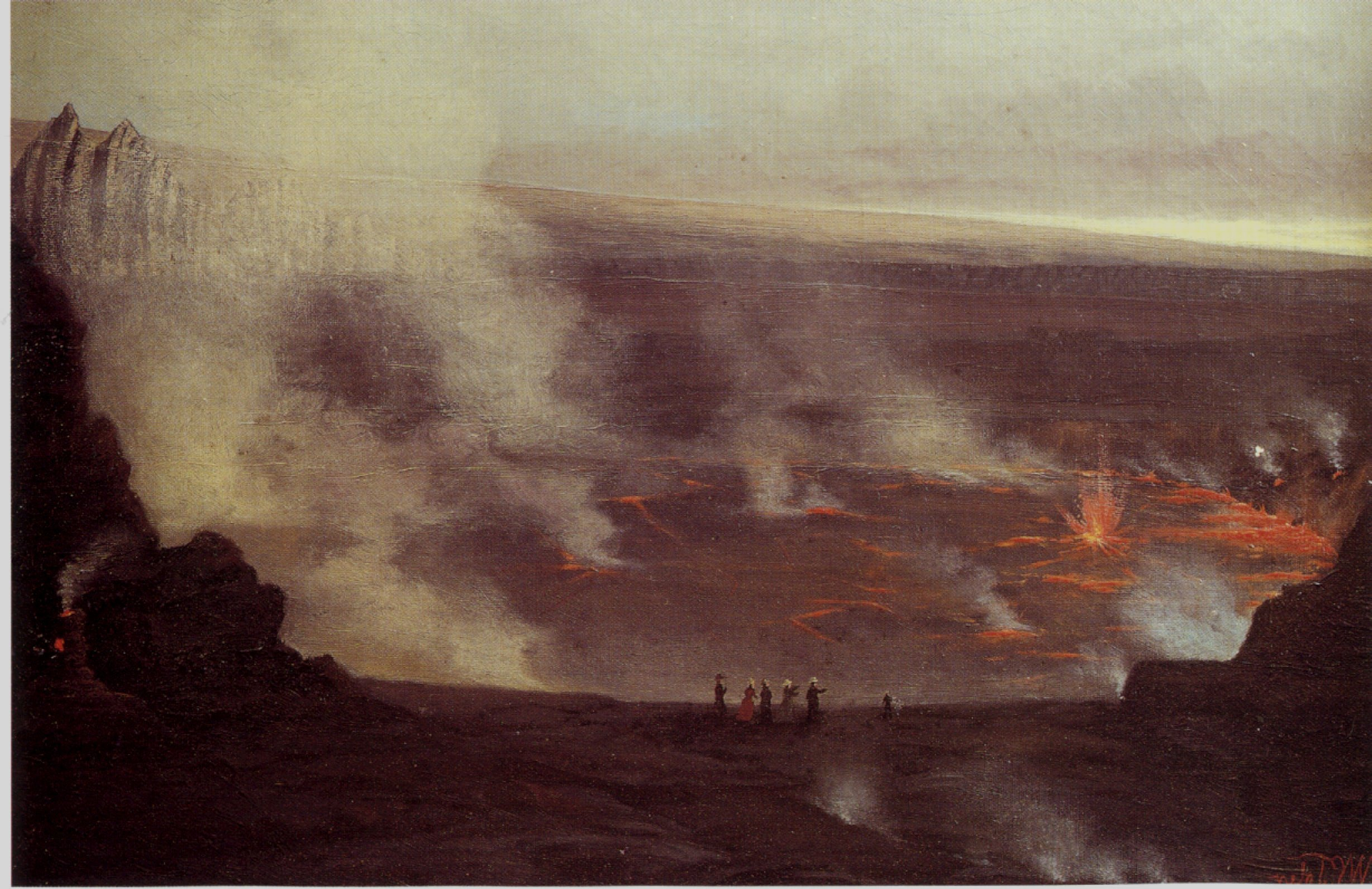
'Kilauea Volcano', oil on canvas painting by William Pinkney Toler, c. 1860s

William Pinkney Toler (1826–1899) was born in Caracas, Gran Colombia on December 23, 1826, the son of a United States diplomat. Toler was educated in Washington, D.C., and joined the Navy at age 14. As a midshipman on the USS United States under the command of Commodore Thomas Gatsby Jones, he hoisted the first American flag up the flagpole of Custom House during the Capture of Monterey 1842. Toler arrived in Hawaii on the United States in 1843. He made a two- or three-day round trip on horseback to sketch Mount Kilauea.

Toler resigned from the Navy in 1848 and accepted a position as assistant to the alcalde, or chief executive officer, in San Francisco. In 1853, he married Maria Peralta, whose family owned the large land grant that is now the city of Oakland, California. He eventually settled in San Leandro, California, where he spent his remaining years. Toler died there on January 24, 1899.
