= Mario Comensoli =

Swiss painter

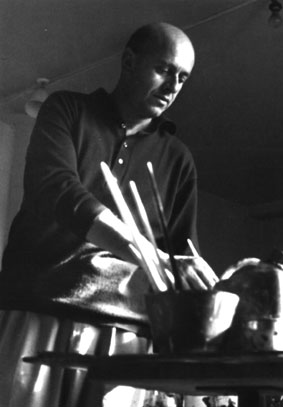
- Born: 15 April 1922; Lugano
- Died: 2 June 1993 (aged 71); Zurich
- Occupation: Painter
- Known for: Realist movement

Mario Pasquale Comensoli (15 April 1922 – 2 June 1993) was a Swiss painter. He is considered as leading figure of the realist movement, depicting the social evolution of post-World War II Switzerland with key themes ranging from Italian immigrants to the 1968 social unrest, the Disco years and the hopelessness of the 'No Future' youth.

== Biography ==
Mario Comensoli was born in Lugano and grew up in Molino Nuovo. After leaving school, he scraped a living by taking on odd jobs and selling portrait and landscape paintings to tourists. In 1943, when the Municipal Museum of Art (Museo civico di belle arti) in Lugano acquired his landscape painting Piccolo Paesaggio, Comensoli obtained a scholarship from the Fondazione Torricelli, which enabled him to attend classes at the Zürcher Hochschule der Künste and lectures at the Eidgenössische Technische Hochschule in Zurich. In 1944 he met his future wife, Hélène Frei, and the two married in Basel a year later. During his stays in Paris Comensoli became acquainted with Joan Miró, Pablo Picasso, Fernand Léger and the brothers Alberto Giacometti and Diego Giacometti.

In 1953 Mario Comensoli was invited by the Zurich Art Society to exhibit 65 works of art at Zurich’s Helmhaus Museum. Comensoli's oil paintings, drawings and sculptures essentially summarised his Paris experience. Although critics appreciated his post-Cubist works, Comensoli changed his artistic style following a polemical attack in the Parisian weekly newspaper Les lettres françaises. This gave rise to Comensoli's pictorial cycle Lavoratori in blu (Workers in blue), a series of oil paintings focused on craftsmen from the south who had immigrated to Switzerland in the 1950s in search of work, whom the painter depicted in blue working clothes and in everyday situations.

Encouraged by the writers Carlo Levi and Saverio Strati, Comensoli exhibited his paintings in Rome at the "Galleria San Luca" he met Renato Guttuso, a painter and master of Italian socialist realism, with whom he had a heated discussion. Guttuso criticised Comensoli for his lack of political vision and the little elegiac nature of his characters. However, Comensoli did not seek to be a political painter. His intention was rather to show the poetry in the marginalised figures of society, who for him represented the new aesthetic. In 1970, Italian immigrants in Switzerland awarded him with the "Nicolao della Flüe" prize for the solidarity aspects of his work, an honour he shared with Max Frisch and the director Alexander Seiler. During those years, Comensoli's painting, while remaining strictly figurative and indifferent to the artistic imperatives of the "Constructivists" dominating the Zurich scene, dealt with the characteristic topics of the 1968 protests, incorporating the stylistic influences of Pop Art.

At the beginning of the 1980s, Comensoli – a keen observer of the world of outsiders – initiated a series of paintings depicting the squatters and drug addicts who populated the so-called "Needle Park" (Platzspitz park) behind the Swiss National Museum in Zurich. These pictures of the "No Future Generation" were among those shown to an international audience at the exhibition in honour of Comensoli at the Kunsthaus Zurich in 1989. On 2 June 1993, at the age of 71, Mario Comensoli died of a heart attack in his studio on Rousseaustrasse in Zurich. His wife died a year later.

== Comensoli’s Pictorial Cycles ==
- 1949–1951: Velofahrer
- 1957–1960: Blauen Periode bzw. Lavoratori in blue
- 1962–1969: Begegnungen
- 1968–1978: Pop Art
- 1979–1983: Discoszene
- 1983–1987: Bewegte Jugend

== Exhibitions (Selection) ==
=== During his lifetime ===
- 1953: Helmhaus, Zürich
- 1974: Villa Malpensata, Lugano
- 1986: Aargauer Kunsthaus, Aarau
- 1989: Kunsthaus, Zürich

=== Posthumous exhibitions ===
- 1998: Museo d’Arte Moderna, Lugano
- 2002: Fondazione Mazzotta, Milan
- 2003: Museo Cà la Ghironda, Bologna
- 2006: Palais de Beaulieu, Lausanne
- 2008: Pinacoteca Casa Rusca, Locarno
- 2009: Galerie Welti Modern Art, Zürich
- 2010: PressArt-Museum der Moderne, Salzburg
- 2011: Cinema Comensoli Vip Pavillion, Zurich Film Festival
- 2014: Museo Civico Villa dei Cedri, Bellinzona
- 2014: Collezione Artrust, Melano (Switzerland)
- 2017: 1968 Schweiz, Bernisches Historisches Museum, Bern
- 2018: Flashes of the Future, Ludwig Forum, Aachen
- 2018: Das Leben ist kein Ponyhof, Kunstmuseum Olten
- 2019: Geschichte Schweiz, Landesmuseum Zürich
- 2020: Die Sammlung Hans Peter Salim, Centro Comensoli, Zürich
- 2020: 120 Tage im Rausch in Zürich, Karl der Grosse, Aachen
- 2021: Frauen Rechte in Zürich, Landesmuseum Zürich
- 2022: La peinture du Mouvement, Centro Comensoli - Zürich
- 2022: Gli uomini in blu, Max Museo/Spazio Officina, Chiasso (Switzerland)
- 2022: Ultime opere, Fafa Fine Art, Lugano
- 2022: Finale, Valley Art, Kemptthal (Switzerland)
- 2023: Comensoli e la Bregaglia, Sala Viaggiatori, Castasegna (Switzerland)
- 2023: 10. Ten years of Artrust, Melano (Switzerland)

== Literature ==
- Anita Siegfried: Die Prinzen der urbanen Wüste: Auf den Spuren von Mario Comensoli. Bilgerverlag, 2023, ISBN 978-3-03762-104-2
- Leben und Leidenschaft: Das Werk des Malers Mario Comensoli. in: Du, Die Zeitschrift der Kultur, Nr. 920, 2023.
- In: Hans Vollmer (Hrsg.): Band 1: A–D. E. A. Seemann, Leipzig 1953.
- Verein zur Herausgabe des schweizerischen Künstler-Lexikons (Hrsg.): Künstlerlexikon der Schweiz XX. Jahrhundert. Band 1. Huber, Frauenfeld 1958.
- Schweizerisches Institut für Kunstwissenschaft, Zürich und Lausanne (Hrsg.): Biografisches Lexikon der Schweizer Kunst, Zürich 1998, Band 1.
- Der Maler und sein Galerist: Mario Comensoli. G. Maecenas-Verlag, Zug / Baar 1996, ISBN 3-907048-08-3
- Aurel Schmidt, Christine Seiler: Mario Comensoli – Begegnungen und Erinnerungen. Versus Verlag, 1998, ISBN 3-909066-00-3
