= Louis Pohl =

American painter (1915–1999)

- Oil painting by Louis Pohl
- Born: September 14, 1915; Cincinnati, Ohio, United States
- Died: December 22, 1999 (aged 84); Honolulu, Hawaii, United States
- Education: Art Academy of Cincinnati
- Occupations: Painter, illustrator, art teacher, printmaker, cartoonist, gallerist

Louis Pohl (September 14, 1915 – December 22, 1999) was an American painter, illustrator, art teacher, printmaker and cartoonist.

== Early life and education ==
He was born on September 14, 1915, in Cincinnati, Ohio. A childhood illness made it impossible to walk without pain and prevented Pohl from entering school until he was 8 years old. To keep him occupied, his parents would give him papers and pencils with which to draw. When 14 years old, Pohl spent his summer caddying at a local golf course. A regular foursome of well-to-do women made an unusual wager—the loser would make their caddy's wish come true. Mrs. Yaeger paid for Pohl's tuition at the Art Academy of Cincinnati for two years. He spent the next 4 years as a teacher's assistant. He did most of the hands-on teaching given to the art students, and he also taught art to underprivileged kids on Saturdays. Eventually, Pohl received his certificate of art upon the completion of a full standing nude copy of a Rembrandt that hung in the Cincinnati Art Museum.

== Career ==
When World War II broke out, Pohl enlisted in the United States Navy, which sent him to Hawaii and assigned him to paint ships in dry dock. He was injured when a destroyer caught fire, and the explosion knocked him off the second level of a scaffold. Pohl was medically discharged and reluctantly returned to Cincinnati, where he was hired by the Works Progress Administration to supervise other artists. In that capacity, he painted a portrait of President Franklin D. Roosevelt.

In 1946, Pohl got a call from a former teacher and friend, Bill Stamper, who had talked the Board of Directors of the Honolulu Museum of Art into establishing a professional art school. Stamper invited Pohl to come to Hawaii to start the school, where Pohl taught for 35 years. Pohl also taught art at the Kamehameha Schools for 15 years. In 1960, he wrote and illustrated the book, It's Really Nice! published by Little, Brown & Company.

Pohl died December 22, 1999, in Honolulu. His widow has continued to operate the Louis Pohl Gallery, also in Honolulu. The Fine Arts Museums of San Francisco, the Hawaii State Art Museum, the Honolulu Museum of Art, and the Isaacs Art Center (Waimea, Hawaii), are among the public collections holding works by Pohl.

== Publications ==
- Pohl, Louis, It's really nice!, Boston, Little, Brown, 1960.

== Selected works ==
'Kids', oil painting by Louis Pohl

'Kalapana, Day Seven', oil on canvas painting by Louis Pohl

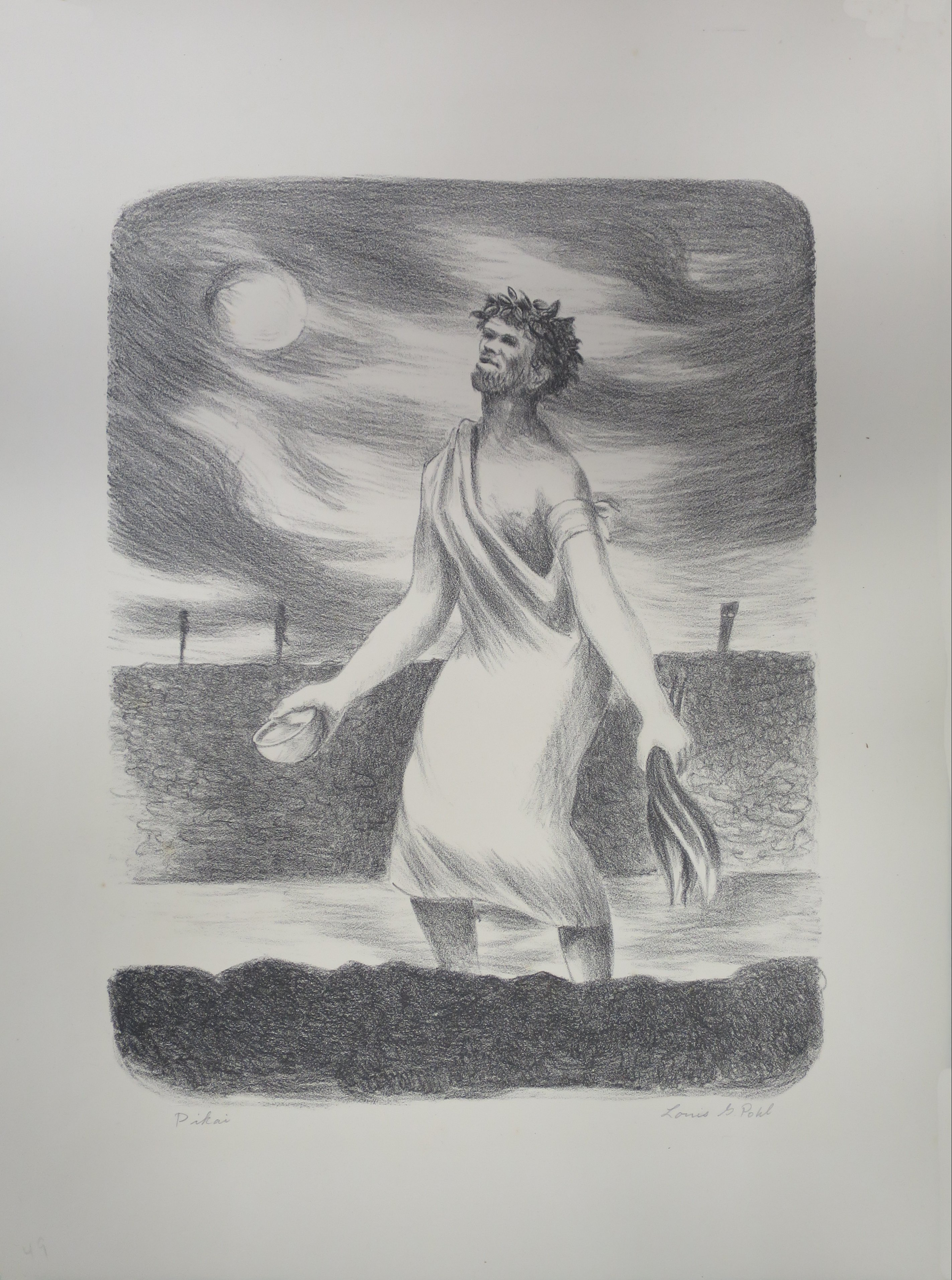
Pikai, lithograph by Louis Pohl, 1951
