= Ernest William Christmas =

Australian painter

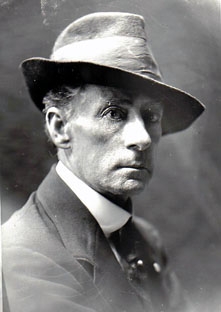
- Born: Ernest William Christmas; 28 January 1863; Yankalilla, South Australia
- Died: 29 July 1918 (aged 55); Honolulu, Hawaii
- Known for: Painter

Ernest William Christmas (28 January 1863 – 29 July 1918) was an Australian painter, known primarily for his landscapes. Much of his later, most familiar work was done outside of Australia: in Europe, South America and, finally, Hawaii.

== Early life and education ==
He was born near Adelaide, South Australia in 1863, to English immigrant parents. His father, John, plied several trades and served as mayor of Kadina. He took his first art lessons in Adelaide and Sydney. The details are unknown, but he seems to have been greatly influenced by the realistic works of Henry James Johnstone. From 1894 to 1900, he lived in Kalgoorlie, where the cultural historian, Tim Bonyhady, says he was a minor artist who painted "Aborigines and dead trees".

During that time, he paid his first extended visit to New Zealand. From 1900 to 1902, he was in Europe, where he was appointed a government representative; selecting works for inclusion at the Australian Federal International Exhibition, to be held at the Royal Exhibition Building. He eventually sent about 270 paintings to Australia. Upon his return, his own works were described as "greatly improved".

== Career ==
From about 1905 to 1907, he lived in New Zealand, working for the Tourist Department and painting in several locations. He also exhibited at the New Zealand Academy of Fine Arts. He was elected a member of the Royal Society and exhibited with them in 1909 and 1910, as well as at the Royal Academy, the Royal Institute of Oil Painters, and the Royal Glasgow Institute of the Fine Arts.

In his later life, he became an even more avid traveler. From 1911 to 1913, he visited Argentina and Chile and roamed throughout the Andes. Many of the works he created there were included in the 1914 edition of Argentina Past and Present by William Henry Koebel. He crossed North America to San Francisco in 1915, exhibiting with the Society of Californian Artists. In 1916, while on his way back to Australia, he stopped in Hawaii and decided to stay. Already in poor health when he arrived, he died there of heart failure, two years later.

== Selected paintings ==
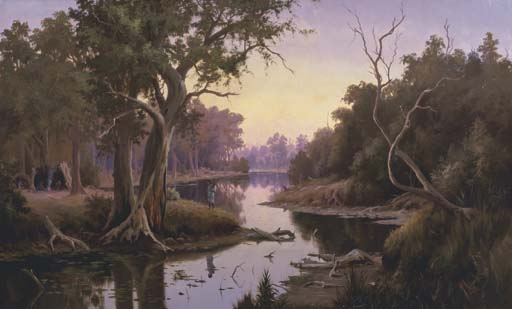
On the Murray River

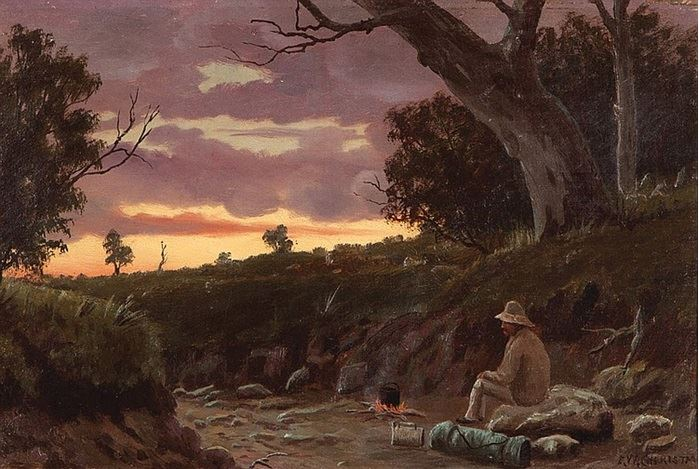
The Sundowner

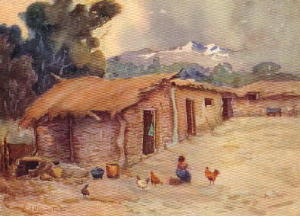
A Peasant's Hut in the Cordillera

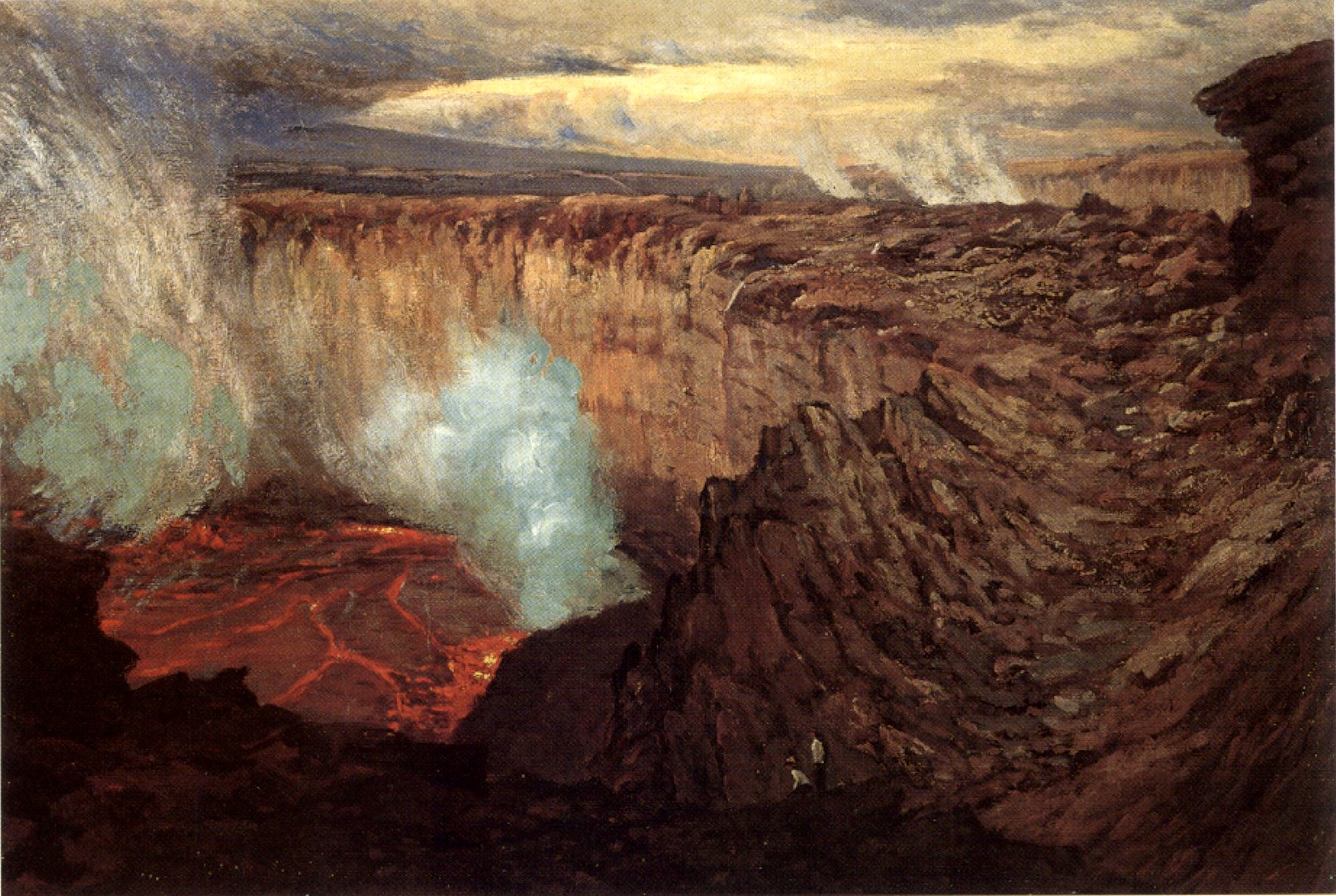
Kilauea Caldera

== Sources ==
- The Encyclopedia of Australian Art, Volume One A-K, by Alan and Susan McCulloch, Hutchinson of Australia, 1984 ISBN 978-0-8248-1688-9
- Dictionary of British Artists Working 1900-1950 by Grant M. Waters, Eastbourne Fine Art Publications, 1975 ISBN 978-0-904722-37-6
- The Dictionary of British Artists 1880-1940 by J. Johnson & A. Greutzner, Antique Collectors' Club, 1976)
- Severson, Don R., Finding Paradise, Island Art in Private Collections, University of Hawaii Press, 2002, pp. 114–115. ISBN 978-0-8248-2657-4
