= Bibliography of Liliʻuokalani =

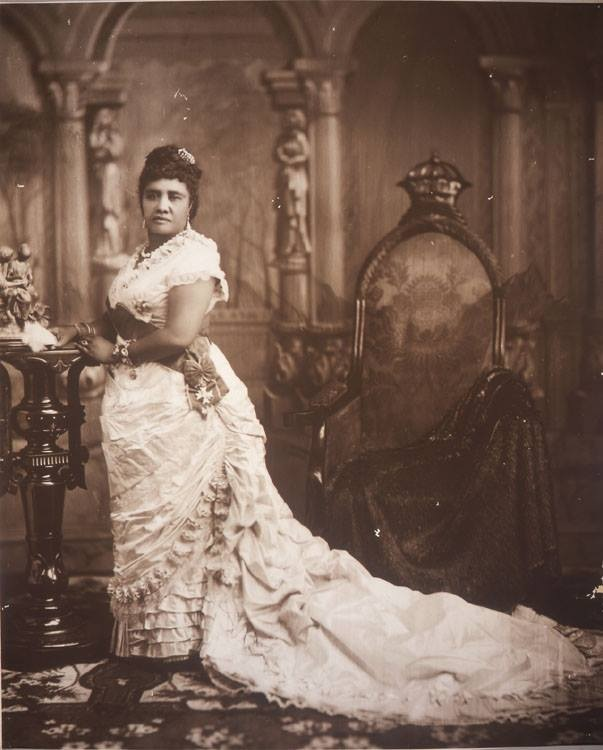
Liliʻuokalani c. 1881

Liliʻuokalani (Hawaiian pronunciation: [liˌliʔuokəˈlɐni]; September 2, 1838 – November 11, 1917) was the first queen regnant and last sovereign monarch of the Kingdom of Hawaiʻi. After King Kalākaua's brother and heir apparent Leleiohoku II died April 9, 1877, he proclaimed his sister Liliʻuokalani to be his successor. Upon his 1891 death, she ascended to the throne, ruling from January 29, 1891, until the overthrow of the Kingdom of Hawaiʻi on January 17, 1893.

She was tried and convicted in 1895 by the military commission of the Republic of Hawaii for involvement in a counter-revolution. Her sentence was commuted to imprisonment in the palace. The composer of "Aloha ʻOe" and numerous other works, she wrote her autobiography Hawaiʻi's Story by Hawaiʻi's Queen during her confinement, and began the English translation of the Kumulipo, the Hawaiian story of creation. After her pardon in 1896, she spent an extended period with family in Boston, while traveling to Washington, DC to petition against the American annexation of Hawaiʻi. Her translation of the Kumulipo was published by Lee & Shepard in 1897.

The following is a list of scholarly and historical resources related to Hawaiʻi's last monarch.

== As author/composer/translator ==
- Liliuokalani; Lange, Arthur (1913). Aloha Oe – Farewell To Thee. Philadelphia: Popular Music Publishing Company. OCLC 10315333 – via HathiTrust.
- Liliuokalani (1884). Collection of Songs Composed By Her Royal Highness Princess Liliuokalani. San Francisco: Pacific Music Company. OCLC 68697922 – via HathiTrust.
- Liliuokalani (1992). The Diary of Queen Liliʻuokalani. Honolulu: Bishop Museum Archives. OCLC 663668411.
- Liliuokalani (1898). Hawaii's Story by Hawaii's Queen, Liliuokalani. Boston: Lee and Shepard. ISBN 978-0-548-22265-2. OCLC 2387226 – via HathiTrust.
- Liliuokalani, Queen of Hawaii (1898). Kumulipo: An account of the creation of the world according to Hawaiian tradition, translated from original manuscripts preserved exclusively in Her Majesty's family. Prayer of dedication, the creation, for Ka I i Mamao, from him to his daughter Alapai Wahine, Liliuokalani's great-grandmother. Lee and Shepard. OCLC 663374517.
- Liliuokalani; Gillett, Dorothy K.; Smith, Barbara Barnard (1999). The Queen's Songbook. Honolulu: Hui Hānai. ISBN 978-0-9616738-7-1. OCLC 42648468.
- Liliuokalani (2020). Forbes, David W. (ed.). The Diaries of Queen Liliuokalani of Hawaii, 1885-1900. Honolulu: Hui Hanai. ISBN 978-0-9887278-3-0. OCLC 1083034391.

== Biographies of Liliʻuokalani ==
- Allen, Helena G. (1982). The Betrayal of Liliuokalani: Last Queen of Hawaii, 1838–1917. Glendale, CA: Arthur H. Clark Company. ISBN 978-0-87062-144-4. OCLC 9576325.
- Iaukea, Sydney Lehua (2012). The Queen and I: A Story of Dispossessions and Reconnections in Hawaiʻi. Berkeley: University of California Press. ISBN 978-0-520-95030-6. OCLC 763161035.
- Hodges, William C. Jr. (1918). The Passing of Liliuokalani. Honolulu: Honolulu Star Bulletin. OCLC 4564101 – via Internet Archive.
- Irwin, Bernice Piilani (1960). I Knew Queen Liliuokalani. Honolulu: South Sea Sales. OCLC 40607143.
- Lowe, Ruby Hasegawa (1994). Liliʻuokalani. Honolulu: Kamehameha Schools Press. ISBN 978-0-87336-027-2. OCLC 30886367.
- Morris, Aldyth (1993). Lili'uokalani. Honolulu: University of Hawaii Press. ISBN 978-0-8248-1543-1. OCLC 27810351.
- Peterson, Barbara Bennett (1984). "Liliuokalani". Notable Women of Hawaii. Honolulu: University of Hawaii Press. pp. 240–244. ISBN 978-0-8248-0820-4. OCLC 11030010.
- Proto, Neil Thomas (2009). The Rights of My People: Liliuokalani's Enduring Battle with the United States, 1893–1917. New York: Algora Publishing. ISBN 978-0-87586-720-5. OCLC 319248358.
- Waihee, Lynne; Cazimero, Momi W; Smith, Emerson C (1994). Her Royal Highness Queen Liliʻuokalani: poet, composer, musician. Lynne Waihee. OCLC 43644681.
- Williams, Riánna M. (2015). Queen Liliʻuokalani, the Dominis Family, and Washington Place, their home. Honolulu: Ka Mea Kakau Press. ISBN 978-0-692-37922-6. OCLC 927784027.
- Wilson, Hazel Hutchins. (1963). Last Queen of Hawaii: Liliuokalani. Knopf. OCLC 1192781 – via HathiTrust.

== Biographies of related people ==
- Andrade, Ernest (1996). Unconquerable Rebel: Robert W. Wilcox and Hawaiian Politics, 1880–1903. Niwot, CO: University Press of Colorado. ISBN 978-0-87081-417-4. OCLC 247224388.
- Britsch, R. Lanier (1986). Unto the Islands of the Sea: A History of Latter-day Saints in the Pacific. Salt Lake City: Deseret Book Co. ISBN 978-0-87747-754-9. OCLC 12839930.
- Calhoun, Charles W. (1988). Gilded Age Cato: The Life of Walter Q. Gresham. Lexington, KT: University Press of Kentucky. ISBN 978-0-8131-6179-2. OCLC 900344816.
- Carter, George Robert (1915). Joseph Oliver Carter: the founder of the Carter family in Hawaii, with a brief genealogy. Genealogical series / Hawaiian Historical Society; 1. Genealogical Committee of the Hawaiian Historical Society – via HathiTrust.
- Kam, Ralph Thomas (2017). Death Rites and Hawaiian Royalty: Funerary Practices in the Kamehameha and Kalakaua Dynasties, 1819–1953. S. I.: McFarland, Incorporated, Publishers. ISBN 978-1-4766-6846-8. OCLC 966566652.
- Kanahele, George S. (1999). Emma: Hawaii's Remarkable Queen. Honolulu: University of Hawaii Press. ISBN 978-0-8248-2240-8. OCLC 40890919.
- Kanahele, George S. (2002) [1986]. Pauahi: The Kamehameha Legacy. Honolulu: Kamehameha Schools Press. ISBN 978-0-87336-005-0. OCLC 173653971.
- Rowley, William D. (1996). Reclaiming the Arid West: the Career of Francis G. Newlands. Indiana University Press. ISBN 978-0-253-33002-4.
- Pratt, Elizabeth Kekaaniauokalani Kalaninuiohilaukapu (1920). History of Keoua Kalanikupuapa-i-kalani-nui, father of Hawaii kings, and his descendants, with notes on Kamehameha I, first king of all Hawaii. Keoua, father of kings. T. H. OCLC 154181545 – via HathiTrust.
- Taylor, Albert Pierce (1927). The Rulers of Hawaii, the Chiefs and Chiefesses, Their Palaces, Monuments, Portraits and Tombs. Honolulu: Printed by Advertiser Publishing Company. OCLC 583264723 – via Internet Archive.
- Topolinski, John Renken Kahaʻi (1975). Nancy Sumner: A Part-Hawaiian High Chiefess, 1839–1895. Honolulu: University of Hawaiʻi at Mānoa. OCLC 16326376.

== Hawaiian National Bibliography ==
- Forbes, David W., ed. (1999). Hawaiian National Bibliography, 1780–1900, Volume 1: 1780–1830. Vol. 1. Honolulu: University of Hawaii Press. ISBN 978-0-8248-2042-8. OCLC 123279964.
- Forbes, David W., ed. (2000). Hawaiian National Bibliography 1780–1900, Volume 2: 1831–1850. Vol. 2. Honolulu: University of Hawaii Press. ISBN 978-0-8248-2379-5. OCLC 123279964.
- Forbes, David W., ed. (2001). Hawaiian National Bibliography, 1780–1900, Volume 3: 1851–1880. Vol. 3. Honolulu: University of Hawaii Press. ISBN 978-0-8248-2503-4. OCLC 123279964.
- Forbes, David W., ed. (2003). Hawaiian National Bibliography, 1780–1900, Volume 4: 1881–1900. Vol. 4. Honolulu: University of Hawaii Press. ISBN 978-0-8248-2636-9. OCLC 123279964.

== General ==
- Osorio, Jon Kamakawiwoʻole (2002). Dismembering Lāhui: A History of the Hawaiian Nation to 1887. Honolulu: University of Hawaii Press. ISBN 0-8248-2549-7. OCLC 48579247.
- Siler, Julia Flynn (2012). Lost Kingdom: Hawaii's Last Queen, the Sugar Kings and America's First Imperial Adventure. New York: Atlantic Monthly Press. ISBN 978-0-8021-9488-6. OCLC 881683650.
- Silva, Noenoe K. (2004). Aloha Betrayed: Native Hawaiian Resistance to American Colonialism. Durham: Duke University Press. ISBN 0-8223-8622-4. OCLC 191222123.
- Twombly, Alexander Stevenson (1899). Hawaii and Its People: The Land of Rainbow and Palm. The world and its people; bk. 9. New York: Silver, Burdett and Company. ASIN B00AVJ4Y7A. OCLC 16331055 – via HathiTrust.
- Van Dyke, Jon M. (2008). Who Owns the Crown Lands of Hawaiʻi?. Honolulu: University of Hawaii Press. ISBN 978-0-8248-6560-3. OCLC 257449971 – via Project MUSE.
- Vowell, Sarah (2011). Unfamiliar Fishes. New York: Riverhead Books. ISBN 978-1-101-48645-0. OCLC 646111859.

== Government records ==
=== Cabinet Ministers ===
- Spaulding, Thomas Marshall (1924). Cabinet Government in Hawaii, 1887–1893. Honolulu: University of Hawaii at Manoa. OCLC 964596158.

=== Privy Council of State ===
Minutes of the Privy Council, 1873–1892

- Hawaii. Minutes of the Privy Council, 1881–1892. Honolulu: Ka Huli Ao Center for Excellence in Native Hawaiian Law, William S. Richardson School of Law. Archived from the original on May 31, 2016.

=== General related records ===
- Blount, James H. (1893). Papers relating to the mission of James H. Blount, United States commissioner to the Hawaiian Islands. US Department of State – via HathiTrust.
- Blount, James Henderson (1895). The Executive Documents of the House of Representatives for the Third Session of the Fifty-Third Congress, 1893–'94 in Thirty-Five Volumes. Washington, D.C.: US Government Printing Office. OCLC 191710879.
- Cleveland, Grover (February 8, 1895). Message from the President of the United States. US Government Printing Office.
- Lee, Anne Feder (1993). The Hawaii state constitution: a reference guide. Westport, CT: Greenwood Publishing Group. ISBN 978-0-313-27950-8.
- Hawaii Legislature (1892). Laws of Her Majesty Liliuokalani, Queen of the Hawaiian Islands: Passed by the Legislative Assembly at Its Session, 1892. Binder's title:Hawaiian Islands laws. Honolulu: Robert Grieve. OCLC 156231006 – via HathiTrust.
- Liliuokalani (1886). Report of Her Majesty Queen Kapiolani's visit to Molokai, by H.R.H. Princess Liliuokalani, July 1884. Honolulu: Printed by the Hawaiian Gazette Company. pp. iii–xvii. OCLC 39817109.
- "The 1897 Petition Against the Annexation of Hawaii". National Archives. August 15, 2016.
- Office of Hawaiian Affairs (1994). ʻOnipaʻa: Five Days in the History of the Hawaiian Nation: Centennial Observance of the Overthrow of the Hawaiian Monarchy. Honolulu: Office of Hawaiian Affairs. ISBN 978-1-56647-051-3. OCLC 31887388.
- Parker, Linda S. (2007). "Alaska, Hawaii, and Agreements". In Fixico, Donald L. (ed.). Treaties with American Indians: An Encyclopedia of Rights, Conflicts, and Sovereignty. Santa Barbara, CA: ABC-CLIO. pp. 199–208. ISBN 978-1-57607-881-5. OCLC 153598713.
- Thorpe, Francis Newton (1909). "TERRITORIAL GOVERNMENT OF HAWAII—1900: An Act to provide a government for the Territory of Hawaii". The Federal and State Constitutions, Colonial Charters, and Other Organic Laws of the State, Territories, and Colonies Now or Heretofore Forming the United States of America – Vol. 2. [United States.] 59th Cong., 2d sess. House. Doc. 357. Washington, D.C.: US Government Printing Office. pp. 881–904 – via HathiTrust.

== Historiography ==
- Alexander, William DeWitt (1896). History of Later Years of the Hawaiian Monarchy and the Revolution of 1893. Honolulu: Hawaiian Gazette Company. OCLC 11843616 – via Internet Archive.
- Apple, Russ; Apple, Peg (1979). Land, Liliʻuokalani, and Annexation. Honolulu: Topgallant Publishing Company. ISBN 978-0-914916-40-6. OCLC 6425124.
- Bonura, Sandra (2017). Light in the Queen's Garden: Ida May Pope, Pioneer for Hawaiʻi's Daughters, 1862–1914. Honolulu: University of Hawaii Press. ISBN 978-0-8248-6644-0. OCLC 1012848889.
- Borch, Fred L. (August 2014). "Lore of the Corps: The Trial by Military Commission of Queen Liliuokalani". The Army Lawyer. Charlottesville, VA: Judge Advocate General's School: 1–3.
- Bunford, Stephen R. (2011). Kamehameha's Crown: A History of the Hawaiian Monarchy. Bloomington, IN: Worldclay. ISBN 978-1-60481-945-8. OCLC 865107256.
- Carpenter, Edmund Janes (1899). America in Hawaii: A History of United States Influence in the Hawaiian Islands. Small, Maynard & Co. – via HathiTrust.
- Dando-Collins, Stephen (2014). Taking Hawaii: How Thirteen Honolulu Businessmen Overthrew the Queen of Hawaii in 1893, With a Bluff. New York: Open Road Media. ISBN 978-1-4976-1429-1. OCLC 874921510.
- Daws, Gavan (1968). Shoal of Time: A History of the Hawaiian Islands. Honolulu: University of Hawaii Press. ISBN 978-0-8248-0324-7. OCLC 45815755.
- Dougherty, Michael (1992). To Steal a Kingdom. Waimanalo, HI: Island Press. ISBN 978-0-9633484-0-1. OCLC 26926764.
- Haley, James L. (2014). Captive Paradise: A History of Hawaii. New York: St. Martin's Press. ISBN 978-0-312-60065-5. OCLC 865158092.
- Hawaiian Gazette Company (1893). Two weeks of Hawaiian history. Hawaiian gazette company – via HathiTrust.
- Inglis, Kerri A. (2013). Ma'i Lepera: A History of Leprosy in Nineteenth-Century Hawaiʻi. Honolulu, HI: University of Hawaii Press. ISBN 978-0-8248-6579-5 – via Project MUSE.
- Kuykendall, Ralph Simpson (1938). The Hawaiian Kingdom 1778-1854, Foundation and Transformation. Vol. 1. Honolulu: University of Hawaii Press. ISBN 0-87022-431-X. OCLC 47008868.
- Kuykendall, Ralph Simpson (1953). The Hawaiian Kingdom 1854–1874, Twenty Critical Years. Vol. 2. Honolulu: University of Hawaii Press. ISBN 978-0-87022-432-4. OCLC 47010821.
- Kuykendall, Ralph Simpson (1967). The Hawaiian Kingdom 1874–1893, The Kalakaua Dynasty. Vol. 3. Honolulu: University of Hawaii Press. ISBN 978-0-87022-433-1. OCLC 500374815.
- Loomis, Albertine (1976). For Whom Are the Stars? An Informal History of the Overthrow of the Hawaiian Monarchy in 1893 and the Ill-Fated Counterrevolution It Evoked. Honolulu: University Press of Hawaii and Friends of the Library of Hawaii. ISBN 978-0-8248-0416-9. OCLC 2213370.
- Loomis, Albertine (1963). "The Longest Legislature". Seventy-First Annual Report of the Hawaiian Historical Society for the Year 1962. 71. Honolulu: Hawaiian Historical Society: 7–27. hdl:10524/35.
- Love, Eric T. L. (2005). Race over Empire: Racism and U.S. Imperialism, 1865–1900. Chapel Hill, NC: Univ of North Carolina Press. ISBN 978-0-8078-7591-9. OCLC 62149408.
- Mellen, Kathleen Dickenson (1958). An Island Kingdom Passes: Hawaii Becomes American. New York: Hastings House. OCLC 1238248. Archived from the original on January 2, 2019 – via Questia.
- Russ, William Adam (1959). The Hawaiian Revolution (1893–94). Selinsgrove, PA: Susquehanna University Press. ISBN 978-0-945636-53-3. OCLC 24846595 – via HathiTrust.
- Taylor, Albert Pierce (1922). Under Hawaiian Skies, A Narrative of the Romance, Adventure and History of the Hawaiian Islands. Advertiser Publishing Company, Ltd.
- Towse, Edward (1895). The Rebellion of 1895: A Complete History of the Insurrection Against the Republic of Hawaii: List of Officers and Members of the National Guard of Hawaii and the Citizen's Guard. Honolulu: The Hawaiian Star. OCLC 16334257 – via Internet Archive.
- Withington, Antoinette. (1953). The Golden Cloak; an informal history of Hawaiian royalty and of the development of the government during each reign under steadily increasing foreign influence. Honolulu Star-Bulletin. ISBN 978-0-935180-26-8. OCLC 44994540 – via HathiTrust.
- Young, Lucien (1902). The real Hawaii: its history and present condition, including the true story of the revolution. Doubleday, Page & Co. – via HathiTrust.

== Journals ==
- Andrade, Ernest Jr. (1990). "Great Britain and the Hawaiian Revolution and Republic, 1893–1898". The Hawaiian Journal of History. 24. Honolulu: Hawaiian Historical Society: 91–116. hdl:10524/562. OCLC 60626541.
- Askman, Douglas V. (2008). "Her Majesty's Disloyal Opposition: An Examination of the English-Language Version of Robert Wilcox's the Liberal, 1892–1893". The Hawaiian Journal of History. 42. Honolulu: Hawaiian Historical Society: 177–200. hdl:10524/135. OCLC 60626541.
- Askman, Douglas V. (2015). "Remembering Liliʻuokalani: Coverage of the Death of the Last Queen of Hawaiʻi by Hawaiʻi's English-Language Establishment Press and American Newspapers". The Hawaiian Journal of History. 49. Honolulu: Hawaiian Historical Society: 91–118. doi:10.1353/hjh.2015.0008. hdl:10524/56608. OCLC 60626541.
- Askman, Douglas V. (2013). "Royal Standards of the Kingdom of Hawaiʻi, 1837–1893". The Hawaiian Journal of History. 47. Honolulu: Hawaiian Historical Society: 61–86. hdl:10524/36268. OCLC 60626541.
- Bonura, Sandra; Witmer, Sally (2013). "Lydia K. Aholo — Her Story Recovering the Lost Voice". The Hawaiian Journal of History. 47. Honolulu: Hawaiian Historical Society: 103–145. hdl:10524/36266. OCLC 60626541.
- Bonura, Sandra (2017). "Queen Liliʻuokalani's Beloved Kawaiahaʻo Seminary". The Hawaiian Journal of History. 51. Honolulu: Hawaiian Historical Society: 31–68. doi:10.1353/hjh.2017.0002. hdl:10524/63030. ISSN 2169-7639. OCLC 60626541. S2CID 165437893 – via Project MUSE.
- Bott, Robin L. (1997). Homans, Margaret; Munich, Adrienne (eds.). "'I Know What is Due to Me': Self-Fashioning and Legitimization in Queen Liliuokalani's Hawaii's Story by Hawaii's Queen". Remaking Queen Victoria. Cambridge: Cambridge University Press: 140–156. ISBN 978-0-521-57485-3. OCLC 185338494.
- Kaeppler, Adrienne L. (2001). "Encounters with Greatness: Collecting Hawaiian Monarchs and Aristocrats". History of Photography. 25 (3): 259–268. doi:10.1080/03087298.2001.10443228. ISSN 0308-7298. OCLC 210279078. S2CID 191393281.
- Kam, Ralph Thomas (2016). "The Private Sorrows of the Overthrow". The Hawaiian Journal of History. 50 (50). Honolulu: Hawaiian Historical Society: 91–102. doi:10.1353/hjh.2016.0004. hdl:10524/59461. ISSN 2169-7639. OCLC 60626541. S2CID 201781351 – via Project MUSE.
- Kam, Ralph Thomas; Lyons, Jeffrey K. (2019). "Remembering the Committee of Safety: Identifying the Citizenship, Descent, and Occupations of the Men Who Overthrew the Monarchy". The Hawaiian Journal of History. 53. Honolulu: Hawaiian Historical Society: 31–54. doi:10.1353/hjh.2019.0002. hdl:10524/63187. ISSN 2169-7639. OCLC 60626541. S2CID 212795443.
- Kam, Ralph Thomas (2020). "The Watchers: How Espionage Doomed the Counter-Revolution of 1895". The Hawaiian Journal of History. 54. Honolulu: Hawaiian Historical Society: 163–190. doi:10.1353/hjh.2020.0005. hdl:10524/63992. ISSN 2169-7639. OCLC 60626541. S2CID 234772314.
- Koda, Tara (Fall 2006). "Aloha with Gassho: Buddhism in the Hawaiian Plantations" (PDF). Pacific World. Third Series (5). Mountain View, CA: Institute of Buddhist Studies: 237–25. OCLC 607735135.
- Kualapai, Lydia (2005). "The Queen Writes Back: Liliʻuokalani's Hawaii's Story by Hawaii's Queen". Studies in American Indian Literatures. 17 (2). Lincoln, NE: University of Nebraska Press: 32–62. doi:10.1353/ail.2005.0053. ISSN 1548-9590. OCLC 664602605. S2CID 161123895 – via Project MUSE.
- Linnekin, Jocelyn (June 1983). "The Hui Lands of Keanae: Hawaiian Land Tenure and the Great Mahele". The Journal of the Polynesian Society. 92 (2). Wellington: The Polynesian Society: 169–188. OCLC 882983804. Archived from the original on February 12, 2018.
- Mcdermott, John F.; Choy, Zita Cup; Guerrero, Anthony P. S. (2015). "The Last Illness and Death of Hawaiʻi's King Kalākaua: A New Historical/Clinical Perspective Cover". The Hawaiian Journal of History. 49. Honolulu: Hawaiian Historical Society: 59–72. doi:10.1353/hjh.2015.0002. hdl:10524/56606. OCLC 60626541.
- Mehmed, Ali (1998). "Hoʻohuiʻaina Pala Ka Maiʻa: Remembering Annexation One Hundred Years Ago". The Hawaiian Journal of History. 32. Honolulu: Hawaiian Historical Society: 141–154. hdl:10524/358. OCLC 60626541.
- Moblo, Pennie (1998). "Institutionalising the Leper: Partisan Politics and the Evolution of Stigma in Post-Monarchy Hawaiʻi". The Journal of the Polynesian Society. 107 (3). Wellington: The Polynesian Society: 229–262. OCLC 6015242891. Archived from the original on February 13, 2018.
- Newbury, Colin (2001). "Patronage and Bureaucracy in the Hawaiian Kingdom, 1840–1893". Pacific Studies. 24 (1–2). Laie, HI: Brigham Young University, Hawaii Campus: 1–38. ISSN 0275-3596. OCLC 193272210. Archived from the original on April 15, 2012.
- Smith, Emerson C. (1956). "The History of Musical Development in Hawaii". Sixty-Fourth Annual Report of the Hawaiian Historical Society for the Year 1955. 64. Honolulu: Hawaiian Historical Society: 5–13. hdl:10524/59.
- Williams, Ronald Jr. (2019). ""Ea mai Hawaiʻinuiākea": Marking the Global Diplomatic Presence of the Nineteenth-century Hawaiian Kingdom". The Hawaiian Journal of History. 53. Honolulu: Hawaiian Historical Society: 133–138. doi:10.1353/hjh.2019.0006. ISSN 2169-7639. OCLC 60626541. S2CID 214114277.

== Thrum's Almanac ==
- Thrum, Thomas G., ed. (1891). "Hawaiian Almanac and Annual for 1891". Honolulu Star-Bulletin. hdl:10524/661.
- Thrum, Thomas G., ed. (1892). "Hawaiian Almanac and Annual for 1892". Honolulu Star-Bulletin. hdl:10524/662.
- Thrum, Thomas G., ed. (1893). "Hawaiian Almanac and Annual for 1893". Honolulu Star-Bulletin. hdl:10524/663.
- Thrum, Thomas G., ed. (1894). "Hawaiian Almanac and Annual for 1894". Honolulu Star-Bulletin. hdl:10524/668.
- Thrum, Thomas G., ed. (1895). "Hawaiian Almanac and Annual for 1895". Honolulu Star-Bulletin. hdl:10524/660.
- Thrum, Thomas G., ed. (1896). "Hawaiian Almanac and Annual for 1896". Honolulu Star-Bulletin. hdl:10524/23173.
- Thrum, Thomas G., ed. (1897). "Hawaiian Almanac and Annual for 1897". Honolulu Star-Bulletin. hdl:10524/31845.
- Thrum, Thomas G., ed. (1898). "Hawaiian Almanac and Annual for 1898". Honolulu Star-Bulletin. hdl:10524/23170.
- Thrum, Thomas G., ed. (1899). Hawaiian Almanac and Annual for 1899. Honolulu Star-Bulletin – via HathiTrust.
- Thrum, Thomas G., ed. (1900). "Hawaiian Almanac and Annual for 1900". Honolulu Star-Bulletin. hdl:10524/23172.
- Thrum, Thomas G., ed. (1901). "Hawaiian Almanac and Annual for 1901". Honolulu Star-Bulletin. hdl:10524/31849.
- Thrum, Thomas G., ed. (1902). "Hawaiian Almanac and Annual for 1902". Honolulu Star-Bulletin. hdl:10524/31850.
- Thrum, Thomas G., ed. (1903). "Hawaiian Almanac and Annual for 1903". Honolulu Star-Bulletin. hdl:10524/31852.
- Thrum, Thomas G., ed. (1904). "Hawaiian Almanac and Annual for 1904". Honolulu Star-Bulletin. hdl:10524/31853.
- Thrum, Thomas G., ed. (1905). "Hawaiian Almanac and Annual for 1905". Honolulu Star-Bulletin. hdl:10524/32434.
- Thrum, Thomas G., ed. (1906). "Hawaiian Almanac and Annual for 1906". Honolulu Star-Bulletin. hdl:10524/31940.
- Thrum, Thomas G., ed. (1907). "Hawaiian Almanac and Annual for 1907". Honolulu Star-Bulletin. hdl:10524/32457.
- Thrum, Thomas G., ed. (1908). "Hawaiian Almanac and Annual for 1908". Honolulu Star-Bulletin. hdl:10524/32462.
- Thrum, Thomas G., ed. (1909). "Hawaiian Almanac and Annual for 1909". Honolulu Star-Bulletin. hdl:10524/36166.
- Thrum, Thomas G., ed. (1910). "Hawaiian Almanac and Annual for 1910". Honolulu Star-Bulletin. hdl:10524/32475.
- Thrum, Thomas G., ed. (1911). "Hawaiian Almanac and Annual for 1911". Honolulu Star-Bulletin. hdl:10524/32834.
- Thrum, Thomas G., ed. (1912). "Hawaiian Almanac and Annual for 1912". Honolulu Star-Bulletin. hdl:10524/32836.
- Thrum, Thomas G., ed. (1913). Hawaiian Almanac and Annual for 1913. Honolulu Star-Bulletin – via HathiTrust.
- Thrum, Thomas G., ed. (1914). Hawaiian Almanac and Annual for 1914. Honolulu Star-Bulletin – via HathiTrust.
- Thrum, Thomas G., ed. (1915). Hawaiian Almanac and Annual for 1915. Honolulu Star-Bulletin – via HathiTrust.
- Thrum, Thomas G., ed. (1916). Hawaiian Almanac and Annual for 1916. Honolulu Star-Bulletin – via HathiTrust.
- Thrum, Thomas G., ed. (1917). Hawaiian Almanac and Annual for 1917. Honolulu Star-Bulletin – via HathiTrust.
- Thrum, Thomas G., ed. (1918). Hawaiian Almanac and Annual for 1918. Honolulu Star-Bulletin. pp. 102–109 – via HathiTrust.

Death, Lying-in-State and Obsequies of Queen Liliuokalani

== Primary sources ==
- Carter, Charles L. (1893). The Hawaiian Question: An Open Letter to Secretary Walter Q. Gresham by Ex-Commissioner Charles L Carter. Star Publishing Co., Ltd. – via HathiTrust.
- Cooke, Amos Starr; Cooke, Juliette Montague (1937). Richards, Mary Atherton (ed.). The Chiefs' Children School: A Record Compiled from the Diary and Letters of Amos Starr Cooke and Juliette Montague Cooke, by Their Granddaughter Mary Atherton Richards. Honolulu: Honolulu Star-Bulletin. OCLC 1972890 – via HathiTrust.
- Dole, Sanford B. (1936). Farrell, Andrew (ed.). Memoirs of the Hawaiian Revolution. Honolulu: Honolulu, Advertiser Publishing Company. OCLC 4823270 – via HathiTrust.
- Hawaiian Gazette Company (1893). Two weeks of Hawaiian History: A Brief Sketch of the Revolution of 1893. Hawaiian Gazette Company – via HathiTrust.
- Krout, Mary Hannah (1898). Hawaii and a Revolution: The Personal Experiences of a Correspondent in the Sandwich Islands During the Crisis of 1893 and Subsequently. New York: Dodd, Mead and Company. ASIN B0011VJARG. OCLC 2012741 – via HathiTrust.
- Mossman (1979). Bina Nieper Mossman: Transcript of interview conducted Sept. 29, 1971 in Hawaii. Honolulu: Watumull Foundation Oral History Project. hdl:10524/48627.
- Palmer, Julius A. (1894). Memories of Hawaii and Hawaiian correspondence. Boston, MA: Lee and Shepard – via HathiTrust.
- Palmer, Julius A. (1895). Again in Hawaii. Boston, MA: Lee and Shepard – via HathiTrust.
- Sauvin, Georges (1987). A Tree in Bud: the Hawaiian Kingdom, 1889–1893. Translated by Alfons L. Korn. University of Hawaii Press. ISBN 978-0-8248-1101-3. OCLC 15629264.
- Stevens, John Leavitt; Stevens, Nellie M.; Oleson, William Brewster (1900). Riches and Marvels of Hawaii; a Charming Description of Her Unique History, Strange People, Exquisite Climate, Wondrous Volcanoes, Luxurious Productions, Beautiful Cities, Corrupt Monarchy, Revolution, Provisional Government and Annexation. Edgewood publishing company – via hathiTrust.
- Thurston, Lorrin A. (1936). Farrell, Andrew (ed.). Memoirs of the Hawaiian Revolution. Honolulu: Honolulu, Advertiser Publishing Company. OCLC 6128790 – via HathiTrust.
- Twigg-Smith, Thurston (1998). Hawaiian Sovereignty: Do the Facts Matter?. Honolulu: Goodale Publishing. ISBN 978-0-9662945-0-7. OCLC 39090004.
- Winter, Carrie Prudence (2012). Bonura, Sandra; Day, Deborah (eds.). An American Girl in the Hawaiian Islands: Letters of Carrie Prudence Winter, 1890–1893. Honolulu: University of Hawaii Press. ISBN 978-0-8248-3722-8. OCLC 821735443 – via Project MUSE.
- Young, Lucien (1898). The Boston at Hawaii; or, The observations and impressions of a naval officer during a stay of fourteen months in those islands on a man-of-war. Gibson Bros. – via HathiTrust.

== See also ==
- Bibliography of Kalākaua
- MOS Hawaii-related articles

== Maps ==
- "Liliʻuokalani Avenue, Honolulu" (Map). Google Maps.
