= Bibliography of Kalākaua =

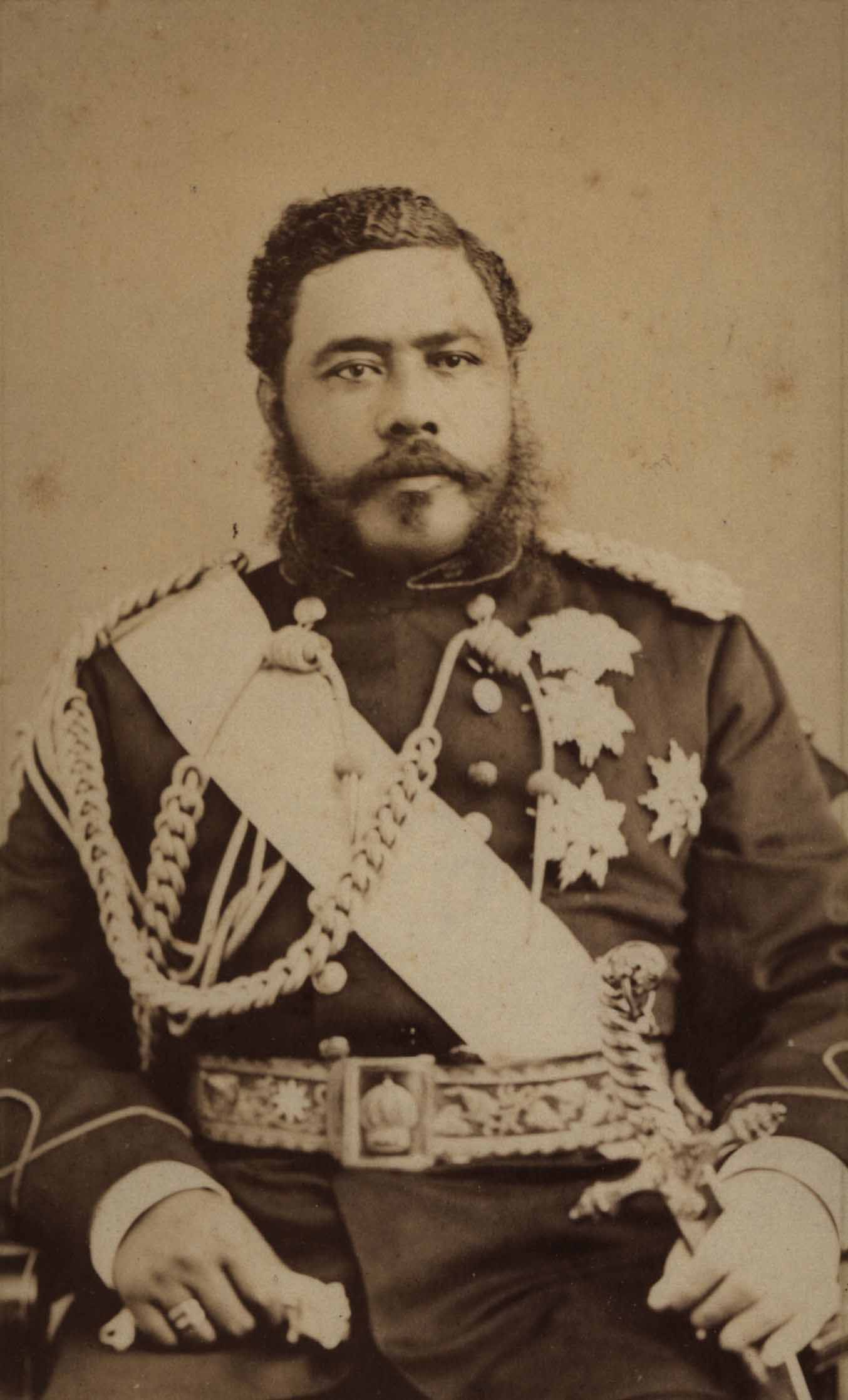
Kalākaua, photograph by A. A. Montano

Kalākaua (November 16, 1836 – January 20, 1891) was the last king and penultimate monarch of the Kingdom of Hawaiʻi. The inherited position of the kingdom's monarch became a legislatively elected office with Lunalilo. Upon Lunalilo's death, Kalākaua won election over his political opponent Queen Emma. He reigned from February 12, 1874, until his death in San Francisco, California, on January 20, 1891.

During his 1874–75 state visit to the United States, he made history as the first reigning monarch to visit the United States. His trip to Washington, D.C. established two diplomatic benchmarks. One was the United States Congress holding their first joint meeting in the body's history, less formal than a joint session, specifically for an audience with him. The second was President Ulysses S. Grant hosting him as honoree of the first state dinner at the White House.

Kalākaua's 1881 world tour was his attempt to save the Hawaiian culture and population from extinction by importing a labor force from Asia-Pacific nations. His efforts brought the small island nation to the attention of world leaders, and also gave him the distinction of being the first reigning monarch to circumnavigate the globe.

The following is a list of scholarly and historical resources related to his life, and to his reign as Hawaiʻi's last king.

== As author/compiler/composer/editor/publisher ==
- Kalakaua, David; Daggett, Rollin M. (1888). The Legends and Myths of Hawaii: The Fables and Folk-lore of a Strange People. New York, NY: Charles L. Webster & Company – via HathiTrust.
- Kalakaua (April 1893). Holder, Charles Frederick (ed.). The Marquesas Archipelago. Vol. III. San Francisco: The Californian Publishing Company. pp. 535–538. OCLC 16322517.
- Kalakaua (March 5, 1891) [1888]. "Kalakaua's Will". Evening Bulletin. Honolulu. p. 3.

=== Chants/songs ===
- "King David Kalakaua discography". Discogs.
- Kalakaua (2016). Na mele aimoku, na mele kupuna, a me na mele ponoi o ka Moi Kalakaua I: dynastic chants, ancestral chants, and personal chants of King Kalākaua I. Hawaiian Historical Society. ISBN 978-0-945048-06-0. OCLC 47666350.
- "David Kalakaua (composer)". DAHR. UC Santa Barbara.
- Kalakaua, David; Leaumoku, Louis and his orchestra. "Koni E Koni Au". Columbia. OCLC 80002142.
- Kalākaua, King David; Owens, Harry; Kaleolani, Alvin (1937). "O-ko-le-ma-lu-na" (Hawaiian drinking song). Decca. OCLC 139986552.
- Kalākaua, King David; Pukui, Mary. ""Sweet Lei Lehua"". www.huapala.org.

== Biographies of Kalākaua ==
- Kalakaua dead. The king dies on a foreign shore ... at San Francisco, Cal., January 20, 1891. Funeral ceremonies ... Reception in Honolulu ... Notes on the king's trip through southern California, by Lieut. Gen. P. Blow, U.S.N. Reports of Rear Admiral Brown, U.S.N., and Medical Inspector Woods. Honolulu: Bulletin Publishing Company. 1891. OCLC 82800064. Archived from the original on February 2, 2017 – via HathiTrust.
- Biographical Sketch of His Majesty King Kalakaua. Honolulu: P. C. Advertiser Steam Printing Office. 1884. pp. 72–74. OCLC 12787107.
- Allen, Helena G. (1995). Kalakaua: Renaissance King. Honolulu: Mutual Publishing. ISBN 978-1-56647-059-9. OCLC 35083815.
- Burns, Eugene (1952). The Last King of Paradise. New York: Pellegrini & Cudahy. OCLC 414982.
- Ing, Tiffany Lani (2019). Reclaiming Kalākaua: Nineteenth-Century Perspectives on a Hawaiian Sovereign. Honolulu: University of Hawaii Press. ISBN 978-0-8248-8156-6. OCLC 1085155006.
- Kalakaua's Hawaii, 1874–1891: A Collection of Pamphlets Dealing with the Political, Social and Economic History of Hawaii during the Reign of King Kalakaua and the Many Controversies of the Period. Honolulu: Hawaiian Historical Society. 1968. OCLC 66894465.
- Kamehiro, Stacy L. (2009). The Arts of Kingship: Hawaiian Art and National Culture of the Kalākaua Era. Honolulu: University of Hawaii Press. ISBN 978-0-8248-3263-6. OCLC 663885792.
- Lowe, Ruby Hasegawa (1999). David Kalākaua. Honolulu: Kamehameha Schools Press. ISBN 978-0-87336-041-8. OCLC 40729128.
- Mookini, Esther T. (1986). The Hale Naua of David Kalakaua. OCLC 39089434.
- Pacific Commercial Advertiser (1881). King Kalakaua's Tour Round the World: A Sketch of Incidents of Travel. Honolulu: Pacific Commercial Advertiser Company. OCLC 156769098 – via HathiTrust.
- Poepoe, Joseph M.; Brown, George (1891). Ka Moolelo o ka Moi Kalakaua I (in Hawaiian). Honolulu. OCLC 16331688.
- Russell, Eva T. (1986). Bibliography of David Laamea Kamanakapuu Mahinulani Naloiaehuokalani Lumialani Kalakaua. OCLC 14956060.
- Schobel, Frances J. (1984). David Kalakaua, the Man. Hilo: University of Hawaii at Hilo. OCLC 19662706.
- Zambucka, Kristin (2002). Kalakaua: Hawaiʻi's Last King. Honolulu: Māna Publishing Company. ISBN 978-0-931897-04-7. OCLC 123305738.

== Biographies of related people ==
- "Half A Century of Life: Professor Berger Reaches His Fiftieth Birthday Today". The Hawaiian Gazette. August 7, 1894. p. 2.
- Adler, Jacob; Kamins, Robert M (1986). The fantastic life of Walter Murray Gibson: Hawaii's minister of everything. University of Hawaii Press. OCLC 562230661.
- Dye, Bob (1997). Merchant Prince of the Sandalwood Mountains: Afong and the Chinese in Hawai?i. University of Hawaii Press. ISBN 978-0-8248-1772-5.
- Gaylor, Ellen (1987). Kapiolani, Queen consort of Kalakaua. Honolulu: Paper prepared for L.S. 930, Hawaiian Resource Material, Graduate School of Library Studies, University of Hawaii at Manoa. OCLC 663431326.
- Kam, Ralph Thomas (2017). Death Rites and Hawaiian Royalty: Funerary Practices in the Kamehameha and Kalakaua Dynasties, 1819–1953. S. I.: McFarland, Incorporated, Publishers. ISBN 978-1-4766-6846-8. OCLC 966566652.
- Liliuokalani (1898). Hawaii's Story by Hawaii's Queen, Liliuokalani. Boston, MA: Lothrop, Lee and Shepard Co. – via HathiTrust.
- Parker, David "Kawika" (2008). "Crypts of the Ali`i The Last Refuge of the Hawaiian Royalty". Tales of Our Hawaiʻi (PDF). Honolulu: Alu Like, Inc. OCLC 309392477. Archived from the original (PDF) on November 11, 2013.
- Pratt, Elizabeth Kekaaniauokalani Kalaninuiohilaukapu (1920). History of Keoua Kalanikupuapa-i-kalani-nui, father of Hawaii kings, and his descendants, with notes on Kamehameha I, first king of all Hawaii. Keoua, father of kings. T. H. OCLC 154181545 – via HathiTrust.
- Stevenson, Robert Louis (1991) [1973]. A. Grove Day. (ed.). Travels in Hawaii. Honolulu: University of Hawaii Press. ISBN 978-0-8248-1397-0. OCLC 23217527.
- Vecoli, Rudolph J.; Durante, Francesco; Gabaccia, Donna R.; Venditto, Elizabeth O. (2018). Oh Capitano!: Celso Cesare Moreno—Adventurer, Cheater, and Scoundrel on Four Continents. Fordham University Press. ISBN 978-0-8232-7989-0 – via Project MUSE.
- Yardley, Maili; Rogers, Miriam (1985). Queen Kapiolani. Honolulu: Topgallant Publishing Company. ISBN 978-0-914916-73-4. OCLC 12705195.

== Hawaiian National Bibliography ==
- Forbes, David W., ed. (1999). Hawaiian National Bibliography, 1780–1900, Volume 1: 1780–1830. Vol. 1. Honolulu: University of Hawaii Press. ISBN 978-0-8248-2042-8. OCLC 123279964.
- Forbes, David W., ed. (2000). Hawaiian National Bibliography 1780–1900, Volume 2: 1831–1850. Vol. 2. Honolulu: University of Hawaii Press. ISBN 978-0-8248-2379-5. OCLC 123279964.
- Forbes, David W., ed. (2001). Hawaiian National Bibliography, 1780–1900, Volume 3: 1851–1880. Vol. 3. Honolulu: University of Hawaii Press. ISBN 978-0-8248-2503-4. OCLC 123279964.
- Forbes, David W., ed. (2003). Hawaiian National Bibliography, 1780–1900, Volume 4: 1881–1900. Vol. 4. Honolulu: University of Hawaii Press. ISBN 978-0-8248-2636-9. OCLC 123279964.

== Government records and treaties ==
=== Cabinet Ministers ===
- Spaulding, Thomas Marshall (1924). Cabinet Government in Hawaii, 1887–1893. Honolulu: University of Hawaii at Manoa. OCLC 964596158.

=== Privy Council of State ===
Minutes of the Privy Council, 1873–1892

- Hawaii. Minutes of the Privy Council, 1873–1875. Honolulu: Ka Huli Ao Center for Excellence in Native Hawaiian Law, William S. Richardson School of Law. Archived from the original on May 31, 2016.
- Hawaii. Minutes of the Privy Council, 1875–1881. Honolulu: Ka Huli Ao Center for Excellence in Native Hawaiian Law, William S. Richardson School of Law. Archived from the original on May 31, 2016.
- Hawaii. Minutes of the Privy Council, 1881–1892. Honolulu: Ka Huli Ao Center for Excellence in Native Hawaiian Law, William S. Richardson School of Law. Archived from the original on May 31, 2016.

=== General related records ===
- Hawaii (1918). Lydecker, Robert Colfax (ed.). Roster Legislatures of Hawaii, 1841–1918. Honolulu: Hawaiian Gazette Company. OCLC 60737418.
- Hawaii. Finance committee. Finance Committee Report – via HathiTrust. - 1884 in English, 1886 and 1888 in the Hawaiian language
- Pacific Commercial Advertiser (January 21, 2022). Honolulu Almanac and Directory – via HathiTrust. - 1884 and 1885, contains statistics, bios and other details of the government

=== Laws ===
- Hewett, A M (1887). A Sketch of Recent Events, being a short account of the events which culminated on June 30, 1887, together with a full report of THE GREAT REFORM MEETING, and the two constitutions in parallel columns. Hawaiian gazette print – via HathiTrust.

37 pages relating to the Bayonet Constitution

- Hawaii Legislature. Laws of His Majesty Kalakaua, King of the Hawaiian Islands: passed by the Legislative Assembly at its sessions 1874–1890. Binder's title:Hawaiian Islands laws. Black & Auld – via HathiTrust.
- Lee, Anne Feder (1993). The Hawaii state constitution: a reference guide. Westport, CT: Greenwood Publishing Group. ISBN 978-0-313-27950-8.

=== Reciprocity treaty ===
- A Brief statement of the political value of the Hawaiian treaty to the United States. Schmidt Label & Lith. Co. 1884 – via HathiTrust.
- Brown, Henry Alvin (1886). Hawaiian reciprocity treaty blunders. Immediate abrogation a national requirement – via HathiTrust.
- Boutwell, George S. (1886). The Reciprocity Treaty with Hawaii; some considerations against its abrogation, with official documents relating to the treaty. Judd & Detweiler – via HathiTrust.
- Robinson, Chalfant (1904). A history of two reciprocity treaties: the treaty with Canada in 1854; the treaty with the Hawaiian Islands in 1876. Tuttle, Morehouse, & Taylor Press – via HathiTrust.
- Spalding, Rufus Paine (1882). A bird's-eye view of the Hawaiian Islands, with some reflections upon the reciprocity treaty with the United States. Leader Printing Co. – via HathiTrust.
- Spalding, Zepharin Swift (1882). Letter from Col. Zeph. Swift Spalding to the Cleveland leader upon the reciprocity treaty with the Hawaiian government. Dated at Honolulu, November 30, 1881. Leader Printing Co. – via HathiTrust.
- Thurston, Lorrin A. (1897). Statement of reasons from an American standpoint: 1. why the Hawaiian Reciprocity Treaty ought not to be abrogated by the tariff bill; and, 2. why it should not, on its merits, be abrogated at all. With an appendix showing opinions of Presidents, Secretaries of State, American Ministers and Naval and Military Officers, and acts of Hawaiian and the American Congress concerning the political control or annexation of Hawaii. Gibson – via HathiTrust.
- Papers relating to the foreign relations of the United States. 1922-1931: Department of State publication. US Government. 1875. p. Vol 1, 669–679 – via HathiTrust.

== Historiography ==
- Alexander, William DeWitt (1894). Kalakaua's Reign: A Sketch of Hawaiian History. Hawaiian gazette Company. ISBN 978-1-976371-08-0. OCLC 16331580.
- Alexander, William DeWitt (1896). History of Later Years of the Hawaiian Monarchy and the Revolution of 1893. Hawaiian gazette Company.
- Bunford, Stephen R. (2011). Kamehameha's Crown: A History of the Hawaiian Monarchy. Bloomington, IN: Worldclay. ISBN 978-1-60481-945-8. OCLC 865107256.
- Buck, Elizabeth (1994). Paradise Remade: The Politics of Culture and History in Hawaiʻi. Philadelphia, PA: Temple University Press. ISBN 978-1-4399-0608-8. OCLC 859678638 – via Project MUSE.
- Cook, Kealani R. (June 2011). Kahiki: Native Hawaiian Relationships with Other Pacific Islanders, 1850–1915 (PDF) (PhD thesis). Ann Arbor: University of Michigan. hdl:2027.42/84558. OCLC 894438599.
- Cook, Kealani (2011). "Kalākaua's Polynesian Confederacy: Teaching World History in Hawaiʻi and Hawaiʻi in World History". World History Connected. 8 (3). Champaign, IL: University of Illinois.
- Dabagh, Jean; Lyons, Curtis Jere; Hitchcock, Harvey Rexford (1974). Dabagh, Jean (ed.). "A King is Elected: One Hundred Years Ago" (PDF). The Hawaiian Journal of History. 8. Honolulu: Hawaiian Historical Society: 76–89. hdl:10524/112. OCLC 60626541.
- Dando-Collins, Stephen (2014). Taking Hawaii: How Thirteen Honolulu Businessmen Overthrew the Queen of Hawaii in 1893, With a Bluff. New York: Open Road Media. ISBN 978-1-4976-1429-1. OCLC 874921510.
- Daws, Gavan (1968). Shoal of Time: A History of the Hawaiian Islands. Honolulu: University of Hawaii Press. ISBN 978-0-8248-0324-7. OCLC 45815755.
- Dole, Charles S. (1929). Papers of the Hawaiian Historical Society number 16: The Hui Kawaihau. hdl:10524/978.
- Dukas, Neil Bernard (2004). A Military History of Sovereign Hawaiʻi. Honolulu: Mutual Publishing Company. ISBN 978-1-56647-636-2. OCLC 56195693.
- Gonschor, Lorenz (2019). A Power in the World: The Hawaiian Kingdom in Oceania. Honolulu: University of Hawaii Press. ISBN 978-0-8248-8001-9. OCLC 1056198239.
- Haley, James L. (2014). Captive Paradise: A History of Hawaii. New York: St. Martin's Press. ISBN 978-0-312-60065-5. OCLC 865158092.
- Johnston, Healoha (2018). Hoʻoulu Hawaiʻi: the King Kalākaua Era. Honolulu: Honolulu Museum of Art. ISBN 978-0-937426-94-4. OCLC 1039305099.
- Kuykendall, Ralph Simpson (1938). The Hawaiian Kingdom 1778-1854, Foundation and Transformation. Vol. 1. Honolulu: University of Hawaii Press. ISBN 0-87022-431-X. OCLC 47008868.
- Kuykendall, Ralph Simpson (1953). The Hawaiian Kingdom 1854–1874, Twenty Critical Years. Vol. 2. Honolulu: University of Hawaii Press. ISBN 978-0-87022-432-4. OCLC 47010821.
- Kuykendall, Ralph Simpson (1967). The Hawaiian Kingdom 1874–1893, The Kalakaua Dynasty. Vol. 3. Honolulu: University of Hawaii Press. ISBN 978-0-87022-433-1. OCLC 500374815.
- MacLennan, Carol A. (2014). Sovereign Sugar. Honolulu, HI: University of Hawaii Press. ISBN 978-0-8248-3949-9. OCLC 875895012 – via Project MUSE.
- Mellen, Kathleen Dickenson (1958). An Island Kingdom Passes: Hawaii Becomes American. New York: Hastings House. OCLC 1238248. Archived from the original on January 2, 2019 – via Questia.
- Osorio, Jon Kamakawiwoʻole (2002). Dismembering Lāhui: A History of the Hawaiian Nation to 1887. Honolulu: University of Hawaii Press. ISBN 978-0-8248-2549-2. OCLC 48579247.
- Silva, Noenoe K. (2004). Aloha Betrayed: Native Hawaiian Resistance to American Colonialism. Durham: Duke University Press. ISBN 978-0-8223-8622-3. OCLC 191222123.
- Tabrah, Ruth M. (1984). Hawaii: A History. W. W. Norton & Company. ISBN 978-0-393-30220-2.
- Taylor, Albert Pierce (1922). Under Hawaiian Skies, A Narrative of the Romance, Adventure and History of the Hawaiian Islands. Advertiser Publishing Company, Ltd.
- Van Dyke, Jon M. (2008). Who Owns the Crown Lands of Hawaiʻi?. Honolulu, HI: University of Hawaii Press. ISBN 978-0-8248-3210-0 – via Project MUSE.
- Votaw, Homer C. (January 1948). When the Navy was Host to Hawaii's King. Vol. 74. Annapolis, MD: United States Naval Institute. pp. 71–?. ISSN 0041-798X. OCLC 213527336.

== Journals ==
- Adler, Jacob (1965). "The Hawaiian Navy Under King Kalakaua". Seventy-Third Annual Report of the Hawaiian Historical Society for the Year 1964. 73. Honolulu: Hawaiian Historical Society: 7–21. hdl:10524/71.
- Andrade, Ernest (1977). "Hawaiian Coinage Controversy – Or, What Price a Handsome Profile". The Hawaiian Journal of History. 11. Hawaiian Historical Society. hdl:10524/415. OCLC 60626541 – via eVols at University of Hawaii at Manoa.
- Askman, Douglas V. (2013). "Royal Standards of the Kingdom of Hawaiʻi, 1837–1893". The Hawaiian Journal of History. 47. Honolulu: Hawaiian Historical Society: 61–86. hdl:10524/36268. OCLC 60626541.
- Askman, Douglas V. (2017). "A Royal Traveler: American Press Coverage of King Kalākaua's 1881 Trip Around the World". The Hawaiian Journal of History. 51. Honolulu: Hawaiian Historical Society: 69–90. doi:10.1353/hjh.2017.0003. hdl:10524/63031. ISSN 2169-7639. OCLC 60626541. S2CID 134037106 – via Project MUSE.
- Askman, Douglas V. (2018). "Kalākaua and the British Press: The King's Visit to Europe, 1881". The Hawaiian Journal of History. 52. Honolulu: Hawaiian Historical Society: 27–55. doi:10.1353/hjh.2018.0001. hdl:10524/63169. ISSN 2169-7639. OCLC 60626541. S2CID 188319384 – via Project MUSE.
- Askman, Douglas V. (2020). "Our Royal Guest: American Press Coverage of King Kalākaua's Visit to the United States, 1874-1875". The Hawaiian Journal of History. 54. Honolulu: Hawaiian Historical Society: 131–162. doi:10.1353/hjh.2020.0004. ISSN 2169-7639. OCLC 60626541. S2CID 234772333.
- Baur, John E. (1988). "When Royalty Came to California". California History. 67 (4): 244–265. doi:10.2307/25158494. JSTOR 25158494.
- Dias, Eduardo Mayone (Winter 1984). "Here Comes "Kalakana": King Kalakaua's Visit to Portugal as Seen by the Portuguese Press". Biography. 7 (1). Honolulu: University of Hawaii Press: 74–90. doi:10.1353/bio.2010.0718. ISSN 1529-1456. OCLC 60626541. S2CID 161816264 – via Project MUSE.
- Frowe, Margaret Mary (1937). The history of the theatre during the reign of King Kalakaua, 1874–1891. Honolulu: University of Hawaii. OCLC 16328589.
- Harper's (January–June 1891). "King Kalakaua of Hawaii". Harper's Weekly. 35. Harper's Magazine Co.: 95–96 – via HathiTrust.
- Ing, Tiffany (May 2015). Illuminating the American, International, and Hawaiʻi Representations of David Kalākaua and His Reign, 1874–1891. University of Hawaii at Manoa. hdl:10125/50983.
- Kaeppler, Adrienne L. (2001). "Encounters with Greatness: Collecting Hawaiian Monarchs and Aristocrats". History of Photography. 25 (3): 259–268. doi:10.1080/03087298.2001.10443228. ISSN 0308-7298. OCLC 210279078. S2CID 191393281.
- Kalakaua (1971). Greer, Richard A. (ed.). "The Royal Tourist—Kalakaua's Letters Home from Tokio to London". The Hawaiian Journal of History. 5. Honolulu: Hawaiian Historical Society: 75–109. hdl:10524/186. OCLC 60626541 – via eVols at University of Hawaii at Manoa.
- Kamehiro, Stacy L. (2000). Monarchs, Monuments and Museums: Public Art, National Culture, and the Reign of King Kalakaua in Late 19th Century Hawaiʻi. Los Angeles: University of California, Los Angeles. OCLC 47004880.
- Kamins, Robert M.; Adler, Jacob (1984). "Political Debut of Walter Murray Gibson". The Hawaiian Journal of History. 18. Honolulu: Hawaiian Historical Society: 96–115. hdl:10524/609. OCLC 60626541 – via eVols at University of Hawaii at Manoa.
- Karpiel, Frank (August 2000). "Mystic Ties of Brotherhood: Freemasonry, Ritual, and Hawaiian Royalty in the Nineteenth Century". Pacific Historical Review. 69 (3). Berkeley: University of California Press: 357–397. doi:10.2307/3641714. JSTOR 3641714.
- Karpiel, Frank (1999). "Notes & Queries – The Hale Naua Society". The Hawaiian Journal of History. 33. Honolulu: Hawaiian Historical Society: 203–212. hdl:10524/509. OCLC 60626541.
- Mcdermott, John F.; Choy, Zita Cup; Guerrero, Anthony P. S. (2015). "The Last Illness and Death of Hawaiʻi's King Kalākaua: A New Historical/Clinical Perspective Cover". The Hawaiian Journal of History. 49. Honolulu: Hawaiian Historical Society: 59–72. doi:10.1353/hjh.2015.0002. hdl:10524/56606. OCLC 60626541. S2CID 162545638 – via Project MUSE.
- Marumoto, Masaji (1976). "Vignette of Early Hawaii-Japan Relations: Highlights of King Kalākaua's Sojourn in Japan on His Trip around the World as Recorded in His Personal Diary" (PDF). The Hawaiian Journal of History. 10. Hawaiian Historical Society: 52–63. hdl:10524/291. Archived from the original (PDF) on June 26, 2020.
- Newbury, Colin (2001). "Patronage and Bureaucracy in the Hawaiian Kingdom, 1840–1893". Pacific Studies. 24 (1–2). Laie, HI: Brigham Young University, Hawaii Campus: 1–38. ISSN 0275-3596. OCLC 193272210. Archived from the original on April 15, 2012.
- Pogány, András H. (1963). "Joseph Jajczay, Captain of the Hawaiian King's Bodyguard". The Hungarian Quarterly. 4 (1–2). Budapest: 53–61. OCLC 18822542.
- Quigg, Agnes (1988). "Kalakaua's Hawaiian Studies Abroad Program". The Hawaiian Journal of History. 22. Honolulu: Hawaiian Historical Society: 170–208. hdl:10524/103. OCLC 60626541 – via eVols at University of Hawaii at Manoa.
- Rossi, Pualiʻiliʻimaikalani (December 2013). No Ka Pono ʻOle O Ka Lehulehu: The 1874 Election of Hawaiʻi's Moʻi And The Kanaka Maoli Response (PDF) (Thesis). Honolulu: University of Hawaii at Manoa. hdl:10125/100744.
- Schweizer, Niklaus R. (1991). "King Kalakaua: An International Perspective". The Hawaiian Journal of History. 25. Honolulu: Hawaiian Historical Society: 103–120. hdl:10524/539. OCLC 60626541.
- Spaulding, Thomas M. (July 22, 1939). Wilfred B. Shaw and Walter A. Donnelly (ed.). The Grand Duke of Gynbergdrinkenstein. Vol. XLV. Ann Arbor: The Alumni Association of the University of Michigan. pp. 299–305. OCLC 1771843. UOM:39015006955929.
- Tate, Merze (1960). "Hawaii's Program of Primacy in Polynesia". Oregon Historical Quarterly. 61 (4). Oregon Historical Society: 377–407. JSTOR 20612586.
- Tsai, Tiffany Lani Ing (2014). ""He Ka Waiho Hoʻohemahema": Kana Maoli Responses to King Kalakaua's Tour of the Kingdom from 1874 Newspapers in Hawaiʻi". Hawaiian Journal of History. 48. Honolulu: Hawaiian Historical Society: 115–143. hdl:10524/47258. OCLC 60626541.
- Tsai, Tiffany Ing (2016). "The 1873 Election in Hawaiʻi between Prince William Charles Lunalilo and the Other Candidate". The Hawaiian Journal of History. 50 (50). Honolulu: Hawaiian Historical Society: 53–73. doi:10.1353/hjh.2016.0002. hdl:10524/59459. OCLC 60626541. S2CID 164663327 – via Project MUSE.
- Williams, Ronald Jr. (2019). ""Ea mai Hawaiʻinuiākea": Marking the Global Diplomatic Presence of the Nineteenth-century Hawaiian Kingdom". The Hawaiian Journal of History. 53. Honolulu: Hawaiian Historical Society: 133–138. doi:10.1353/hjh.2019.0006. ISSN 2169-7639. OCLC 60626541. S2CID 214114277.

== Thrum's Almanac ==
- Thrum, Thomas G., ed. (1875). "Hawaiian Almanac and Annual for 1875". Honolulu Star-Bulletin. hdl:10524/664.
- Thrum, Thomas G., ed. (1876). "Hawaiian Almanac and Annual for 1876". Honolulu Star-Bulletin. hdl:10524/665.
- Thrum, Thomas G., ed. (1877). "Hawaiian Almanac and Annual for 1877". Honolulu Star-Bulletin. hdl:10524/658.
- Thrum, Thomas G., ed. (1878). "Hawaiian Almanac and Annual for 1878". Honolulu Star-Bulletin. hdl:10524/667.
- Thrum, Thomas G., ed. (1879). "Hawaiian Almanac and Annual for 1879". Honolulu Star-Bulletin. hdl:10524/669.
- Thrum, Thomas G., ed. (1880). "Hawaiian Almanac and Annual for 1880". Honolulu Star-Bulletin. hdl:10524/656.
- Thrum, Thomas G., ed. (1881). Portuguese Immigration to the Hawaiian Islands. Honolulu: Honolulu Star-Bulletin. hdl:10524/23168.
- Thrum, Thomas G., ed. (1882). "Hawaiian Almanac and Annual for 1882". Honolulu Star-Bulletin. hdl:10524/23169.
- Thrum, Thomas G., ed. (1883). Portuguese Immigration to the Hawaiian Islands. Honolulu: Honolulu Star-Bulletin. hdl:10524/657.
- Thrum, Thomas G., ed. (1884). "Hawaiian Almanac and Annual for 1884". Honolulu Star-Bulletin. hdl:10524/985.
- Thrum, Thomas G., ed. (1885). "Hawaiian Almanac and Annual for 1885". Honolulu Star-Bulletin. hdl:10524/1078.
- Thrum, Thomas G., ed. (1886). "Hawaiian Almanac and Annual for 1886". Honolulu Star-Bulletin. hdl:10524/1484.
- Thrum, Thomas G., ed. (1887). "Hawaiian Almanac and Annual for 1887". Honolulu Star-Bulletin. hdl:10524/659.
- Thrum, Thomas G., ed. (1888). "Hawaiian Almanac and Annual for 1888". Honolulu Star-Bulletin. hdl:10524/666.
- Thrum, Thomas G., ed. (1889). "Hawaiian Almanac and Annual for 1889". Honolulu Star-Bulletin. hdl:10524/655.
- Thrum, Thomas G., ed. (1890). "Hawaiian Almanac and Annual for 1890". Honolulu Star-Bulletin. hdl:10524/31851.
- Thrum, Thomas G., ed. (1891). "Hawaiian Almanac and Annual for 1891". Honolulu Star-Bulletin. hdl:10524/661.
- Thrum, Thomas G., ed. (1892). "Hawaiian Almanac and Annual for 1892". Honolulu Star-Bulletin. hdl:10524/662.
- Thrum, Thomas G., ed. (1893). "Hawaiian Almanac and Annual for 1893". Honolulu Star-Bulletin. hdl:10524/663.
- Thrum, Thomas G., ed. (1894). "Hawaiian Almanac and Annual for 1894". Honolulu Star-Bulletin. hdl:10524/668.
- Thrum, Thomas G., ed. (1895). "Hawaiian Almanac and Annual for 1895". Honolulu Star-Bulletin. hdl:10524/660.
- Thrum, Thomas G., ed. (1896). Japanese immigration. Honolulu: Honolulu Star-Bulletin. hdl:10524/23173.

== Primary sources ==
- Armstrong, William N. (1904). Around the World with a King. New York, NY: F. A. Stokes Company – via HathiTrust.
- Chapin, Helen G. (2000). Guide to Newspapers of Hawaiʻi: 1834–2000. Honolulu: Hawaiian Historical Society. hdl:10524/1444. OCLC 45330644.
- Chapin, Helen G. (1984). "Newspapers of Hawaiʻi's 1834 to 1903: From He Liona to the Pacific Cable". The Hawaiian Journal of History. 18. Honolulu: Hawaiian Historical Society: 47–86. hdl:10524/179. OCLC 60626541 – via eVols at University of Hawaii at Manoa.
- Chapin, Helen Geracimos (1996). Shaping History: The Role of Newspapers in Hawaiʻi. Honolulu: University of Hawaii Press. ISBN 978-0-8248-1718-3. OCLC 247186687.
- Cooke, Amos Starr; Cooke, Juliette Montague (1937). Richards, Mary Atherton (ed.). The Chiefs' Children School: A Record Compiled from the Diary and Letters of Amos Starr Cooke and Juliette Montague Cooke, by Their Granddaughter Mary Atherton Richards. Honolulu: Honolulu Star-Bulletin. OCLC 1972890 – via HathiTrust.
- Dole, Sanford B. (1936). Farrell, Andrew (ed.). Memoirs of the Hawaiian Revolution. Honolulu: Honolulu, Advertiser Publishing Company. OCLC 4823270 – via HathiTrust.
- Grant, M. Forsyth (1888). Scenes in Hawaii or Life in the Sandwich Islands. CIHM/ICMH collection de microfiches; no. 03168. Toronto: Hart & Company. ISBN 978-0-665-03168-7. OCLC 898746331 – via HathiTrust.
- Hallock, Leavitt Homan (1911). Hawaii Under King Kalakaua from Personal Experiences of Leavitt H. Hallock. Portland, ME: Smith & Sale. OCLC 2802182 – via HathiTrust.
- The Pacific Commercial Advertiser (1883). Coronation of the King and Queen of the Hawaiian Islands, at Honolulu, Monday, Feb 12th 1883. Honolulu: Printed at the Advertiser Steam Printing House. OCLC 77955761 – via HathiTrust.
- Sauvin, Georges (1987). A Tree in Bud: the Hawaiian Kingdom, 1889–1893. Translated by Alfons L. Korn. University of Hawaii Press. ISBN 978-0-8248-1101-3. OCLC 15629264.
- Spreckels, Claus (March 1891). "The Future of the Sandwich Islands". The North American Review. 152 (412): 287–291. JSTOR 25102142. OCLC 946727491.
- Thrum, Thomas G. (March 3, 1874). THE SECOND INTERREGNUM. A complete Resume of Events from the Death to the Burial of his Late Majesty Lunalilo. Honolulu: Black & Auld. OCLC 41209326.
- Thurston, Lorrin A. (1936). Memoirs of the Hawaiian Revolution. Honolulu Advertiser Publishing – via HathiTrust.
- Twain, Mark (1938). Letters from the Sandwich Islands: Written for the Sacramento Union. Palo Alto: Stanford University Press. pp. 16–137. OCLC 187974 – via HathiTrust.
- Woods, George Worth (1891). Medical Report to Hon. John A. Cummins, Minister of Foreign Affairs, on the Last Illness and Death of Kalakaua I, King of Hawaii. Printed on board U.S. Flagship Charleston. OCLC 651681033.

== Political satire ==
- Atkinson, Alatau Tamchiboulac; Purvis, Edward William (1886). The Grand Duke of Gynbergdrinkenstein. Honolulu. OCLC 16338005.
- Atkinson, Alatau Tamchiboulac; Purvis, Edward William (1887). The Gynberg Ballads. San Francisco: Schmidt Lithograph Co. OCLC 978697438 – via HathiTrust.
- Dole, Sanford B (1885). Vacuum: A Farce in Three Acts. OCLC 663486864.

== See also ==
- Bibliography of Liliʻuokalani
- MOS Hawaii-related articles

== Maps ==
- "Kalākaua Avenue, Honolulu" (Map). Google Maps.
