= Dudoit =

Dudoit is a surname. Notable people with this name include:

- Horace K. Dudoit, Hawaiian musician
- Jules Dudoit (1803–1866), French Ambassador to the Kingdom of Hawaii
- Mahealani Dudoit (1954–2002), Hawaiian poet
- Sandrine Dudoit, French-American statistician
- Xavier Dudoit (born 1975), French footballer

== See also ==
- Alain Dudoit, Canadian Ambassador to Czechia and Slovakia and to Spain
- Axel Dudoit, French footballer for LB Châteauroux
- Bridget Lokelani Dudoit, member of Belgian-English rock band Esperanto
