= Morgan Report =

1894 U.S. Congressional report regarding overthrow of the Hawaiian Kingdom

Morgan Report

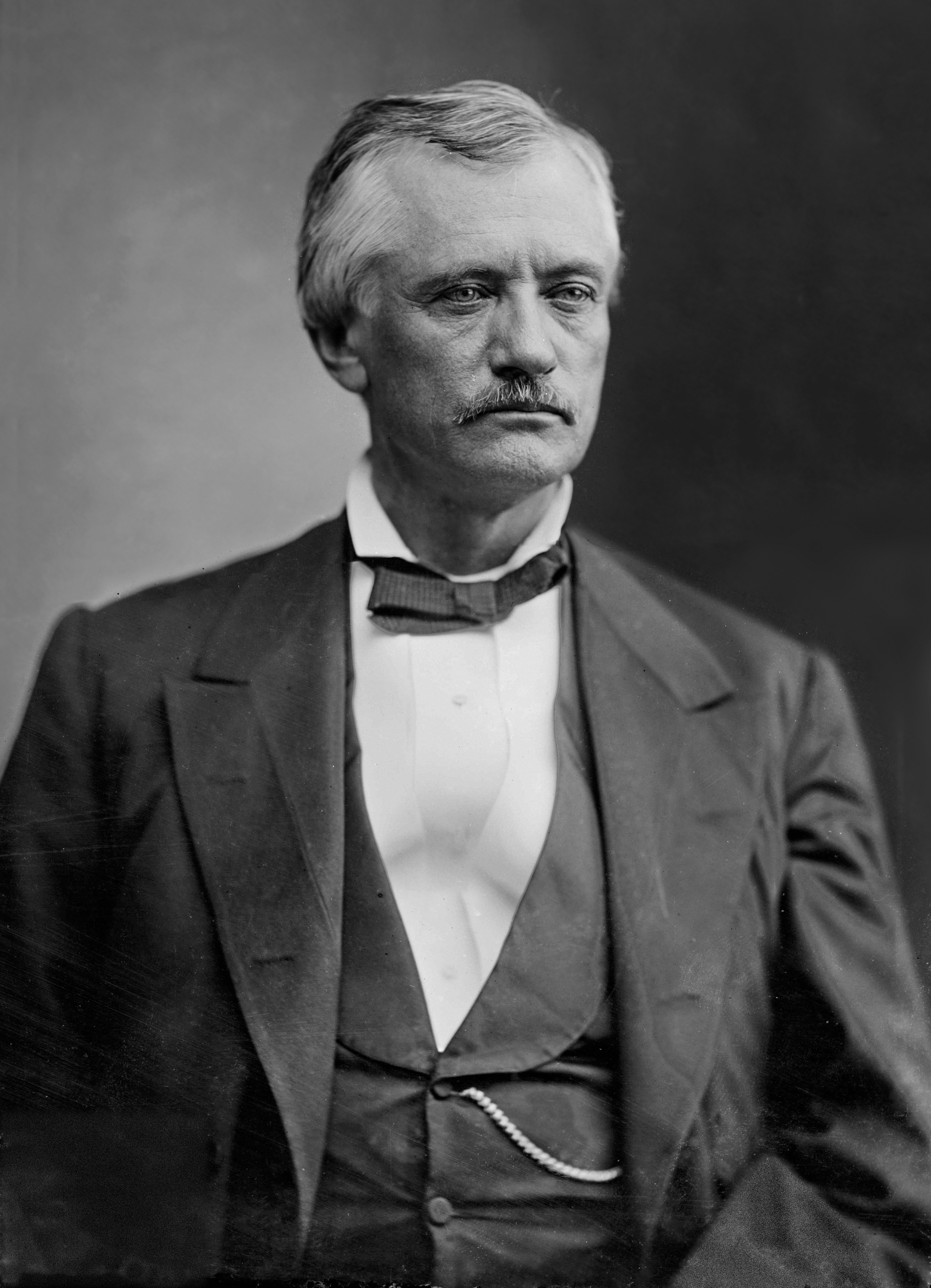
Senator John T. Morgan, chairman of the U.S. Senate Committee on Foreign Relations, oversaw the report

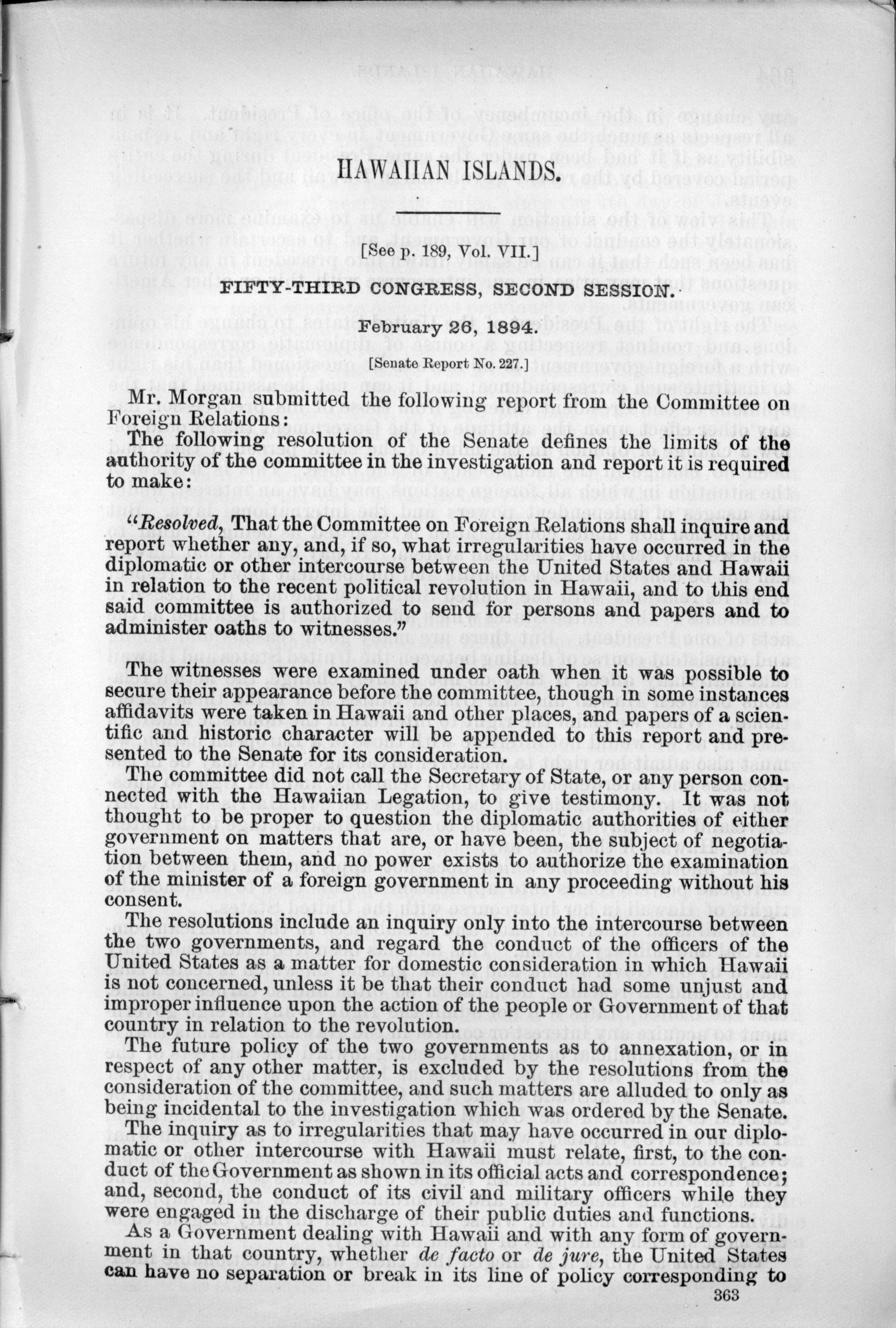
First page of Senate Report No. 227, 53rd United States Congress

The Morgan Report was an 1894 report concluding an official U.S. Congressional investigation into the events surrounding the overthrow of the Hawaiian Kingdom, including the alleged role of U.S. military troops (both bluejackets and marines) in the overthrow of Queen Liliʻuokalani. Along with the Blount Report submitted in 1893, it is one of the main source documents compiling the testimony of witnesses and participants in the overthrow of the Hawaiian Kingdom in January 1893. The Morgan Report was the final result of an official U.S. Congressional investigation into the overthrow, conducted by the United States Senate Committee on Foreign Relations, whose chairman was Senator John Tyler Morgan, Democrat of Alabama.

The Report is formally named "Senate Report No. 227" of the 53rd Congress, second session, and dated February 26, 1894. It was printed as part of a large volume containing other government documents: "Reports of Committee on Foreign Relations 1789–1901 Volume 6."

== Background ==
The Blount Report had concluded that the U.S. Minister to Hawaii John L. Stevens carried out unauthorized partisan activities, including the landing of U.S. Marines under a false or exaggerated pretext, to support the anti-royalist conspirators and that these actions were instrumental to the success of the overthrow of the queen. The Morgan Report contradicted the Blount Report, finding all individuals involved in the overthrow – with the notable exception of Queen Liliʻuokalani – "not guilty". The Native Hawaiians Study Commission Report of 1993, commenting on the two competing reports, states: "The truth lies somewhere between the two reports."

The Morgan Report's submission in 1894 roughly coincided with the Turpie Resolution, which terminated Cleveland's efforts to restore the Queen. Cleveland accepted the conclusions of the Morgan Report, continued to engage in diplomatic relations with the Provisional Government, recognized the Republic of Hawaii upon its declaration on July 4, 1894, and even negotiated treaties originally ratified under the Kingdom government with the Republic.

The nine-member Senate Foreign Relations Committee that submitted the report could not agree on a final conclusion, and the oft-cited executive summary was signed only by Morgan himself. Other Republican members of the Committee, including Senators Sherman, Frye, Dolph, and Davis, generally agreed with the report, but refused to endorse the actions of Blount (who was appointed by President Cleveland, a Democrat). Democratic Senators Turpie, Butler, Daniel, and Gray did not endorse the approval of Minister Stevens' actions; while Butler and Turpie generally approved annexation, they refused to endorse the Morgan Report's conclusions because of the implications for internal disorder in Hawaii. Gray and Daniel were apparently outright opposed to annexation.

== Origin ==
The Morgan Report was the final result of Cleveland's referral of the matter of the overthrow to Congress.

Cleveland from the Blount Report:

Though I am not able now to report a definite change in the actual situation, I am convinced that the difficulties lately created both here and in Hawaii and now standing in the way of a solution through Executive action of the problem presented, render it proper, and expedient, that the matter should be referred to the broader authority and discretion of Congress, with a full explanation of the endeavor thus far made to deal with the emergency and a statement of the considerations which have governed my action...

...I therefore submit this communication with its accompanying exhibits, embracing Mr. Blount's report, the evidence and statements taken by him at Honolulu, the instructions given to both Mr. Blount and Minister Willis, and correspondence connected with the affair in hand. In commending this subject to the extended powers and wide discretion of the Congress, I desire to add the assurance that I shall be much gratified to cooperate in any legislative plan which may be devised for the solution of the problem before us which is consistent with American honor, integrity and morality.

GROVER CLEVELAND
Executive Mansion,
Washington, December 18, 1893

== Historical background ==
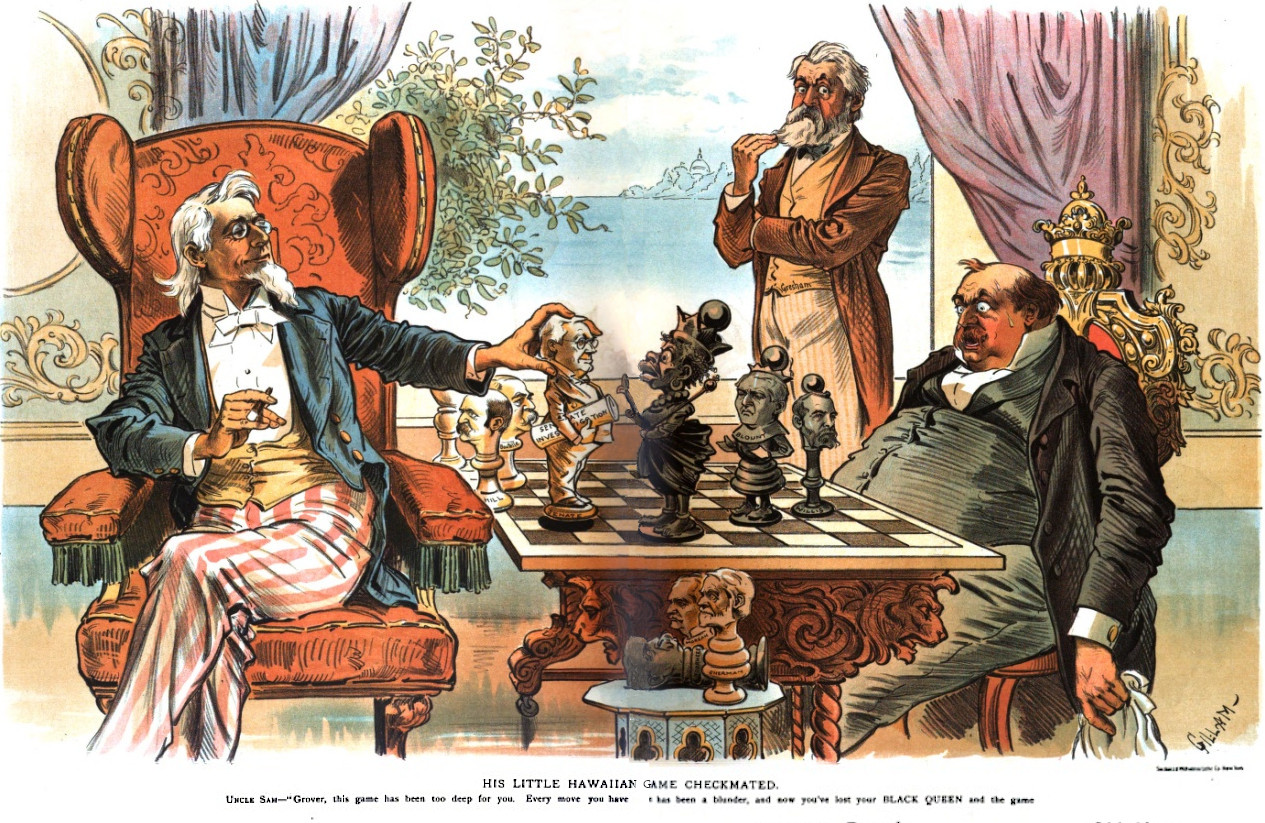
His Little Hawaiian Game Checkmated, 1894

At the time the Hawaiian Kingdom was overthrown, President Benjamin Harrison, a Republican expansionist, was only a few weeks from the end of his term. The new Provisional Government of Hawai'i immediately delivered a treaty of annexation to President Harrison, who referred it favorably to the Senate for ratification on February 15, 1893.

Grover Cleveland, a Democrat opposed to expansionism and colonialism, became President on March 4, 1893 and withdrew the treaty from the Senate on March 9, 1893.

James Henderson Blount, a Democrat, had been chairman of the U.S. House Committee on Foreign Affairs during Harrison's term. On March 11, without seeking confirmation from the Senate (though it was in session at the time), President Cleveland appointed Blount to be a special envoy to Hawaiʻi with "paramount" powers and secret instructions to investigate the circumstances of the revolution and the stability of the Provisional Government.

Blount held secret, informal conversations with royalists and annexationists in Honolulu. He invited certain witnesses to sit with him to give formal statements in the presence of a stenographer, to be published later in the Blount Report. These statements were not under oath, and several of them were recanted when made public. Historian Ernest Andrade wrote, "He interviewed only a few people involved in the instigation and carrying out of the revolution. He took no testimony from the officers and enlisted men of USS Boston." He delivered a report to President Cleveland on July 17, 1893, claiming improper U.S. backing for the revolution had been responsible for its success, and that the Provisional Government lacked popular support.

On the basis of Blount's report, President Cleveland began working towards the restoration of the Queen, conditional upon amnesty towards those responsible for the overthrow. Minister Willis was unable to convince the Queen to grant the Committee of Safety amnesty in return for the throne until December 18, 1893, at which point Willis, on behalf of Cleveland, then ordered Hawai'i President Sanford Dole to dissolve the Provisional Government and restore the Queen. Dole flatly refused in a blistering letter decrying Cleveland's interference. Unbeknownst to Willis, on the same day he demanded President Dole to step down, December 18, Cleveland had already given up convincing the Queen to grant amnesty, and sent a message to Congress declaring the revolution improper and decrying the U.S. involvement in it, referring the matter to their authority.

In response, the Senate passed a resolution empowering its Foreign Relations Committee to hold public hearings under oath, and cross-examine witnesses, to investigate U.S. involvement in the revolution, and also to investigate whether it had been proper for President Cleveland to appoint Blount and give him extraordinary powers to represent the U.S. and intervene in Hawaiʻi without Senate confirmation.

The final result of this investigation is the Morgan Report, submitted on February 26, 1894.

=== Subsequent action by Congress ===
The Turpie Resolution of May 31, 1894, which was protested by Queen Liliʻuokalani, was a direct result of the Morgan Report. The Turpie Resolution ended all hope of the Queen for further intervention on her behalf.

=== Cleveland's final position ===
Cleveland accepted the verdict of the Congressional committee, abandoned efforts to reinstate the Queen, and treated the Provisional Government and Republic of Hawaiʻi as the internationally recognized lawful successors of the Kingdom of Hawaiʻi. Despite his strong words of December 18, 1893, after the investigation conducted by the Morgan Committee, and the Senate's Turpie Resolution of May 31, 1894, he never again questioned the legitimacy of the overthrow.

In his last bit of resistance to accepting the overthrow, Cleveland managed to get the wording for the Turpie Resolution changed to refer to the "people" rather than the "Provisional Government", although the net effect was still a complete renunciation of his hopes to restore Queen Liliʻuokalani to power.

== Specific conclusions of the committee ==
The majority report submitted contained the following conclusions:

- A condition of affairs existed in Honolulu which led naturally to the apprehension that violence or civil commotion would ensue, in which the peace and security of American citizens would be put in peril, as had been done on three or more separate occasions previously when changes occurred or were about to occur in the government of Hawaiʻi;
- The action of the Queen in an effort to overturn the constitution of 1887, to which she had sworn obedience and support, had been accepted and treated by a large and powerful body of the people as a violation of her constitutional obligations, revolutionary in its character and purposes and that it amounted to an act of abdication on her part, so far as her powers and the rights of the people under the constitution of 1887 were concerned. This state of opinion and this condition of the executive head of the Hawaiian Government neutralized its power to protect American citizens and other foreigners in their treaty rights, and also their rights under the laws of Hawaiʻi;
- In landing the troops from the Boston there was no demonstration of actual hostilities, and their conduct was as quiet and as respectful as it had been on many previous occasions when they were landed for the purpose of drill and practice. In passing the palace on their way to the point at which they were halted, the Queen appeared upon the balcony and the troops respectfully saluted her by presenting arms and dipping the flag, and made no demonstration of any hostile intent;
- The committee agree that such was the condition of the Hawaiian Government at the time that the troops were landed in Honolulu from the steam warship Boston; that there was then an interregnum in Hawaii as respects the executive office; that there was no executive power to enforce the laws of Hawaiʻi, and that it was the right of the United States to land troops upon those islands at any place where it was necessary in the opinion of our minister to protect our citizens;
- Afterward, on February 1, 1893, the American minister caused the flag of the United States to be raised on the Government building in Honolulu, and assumed and declared a protectorate over that nation in the name of the United States. This act on the part of our minister was without authority, and was void for want of power. It was disavowed by Secretary Foster and rebuked by Secretary Gresham, and the order to abandon the protectorate and haul down the flag was in accordance with the duty and honor of the United States. To haul down the flag of the United States was only an order to preserve its honor.

A minority report by the four Republicans criticized Blount's appointment and activities.

A minority report by four of the Democrats criticized Minister Stevens for his actions.

All the Senators exonerated the actions of the U.S. military.

Broken down by topic, the votes were as follows:

- 9–0: U.S. military acted in neutrality
- 5–4: Blount's appointment was constitutional (Morgan and his fellow Democrats)
- 5–4: Steven's actions were justified (Morgan and four Republicans)

== Members of the Committee ==
=== Republicans ===
- John Sherman
- Joseph N. Dolph
- William P. Frye
- Cushman K. Davis

=== Democrats ===
- John Tyler Morgan
- Matthew Butler
- David Turpie
- John W. Daniel
- George Gray

== Controversies ==
=== Online accessibility ===
The Morgan Report has been treated with a significant amount of skepticism by pro-sovereignty academics, and has largely been glossed over since the 1970s. Although the Morgan Report was planned to be digitized by the University of Hawaii as part of a collection of annexation documents in 2001, only the pro-sovereignty Blount Report was completed. The library's project ended in 2002 and no further grants were applied for; it is also understood that a devastating flood in 2004 caused significant setbacks for their program. The project narrative for the 2002 grant application to digitize documents, including the Morgan Report said, "The materials selected however are not one-sided. The Morgan Report challenges the Blount Report, which implicated the United States in the overthrow of the Hawaiian monarchy."

It was not until volunteers outside of the University of Hawaii took on the task of digitizing the Morgan Report that it was made available online in 2006. Since its online publication, the University of Hawaii has maintained a link to the website where the report is published alongside their other annexation documents.

=== Morgan's racism ===
The Morgan Committee was chaired by Senator John Tyler Morgan of Jim Crow political fame. An Alabama Review article written by Thomas Upchurch states that Morgan wanted to find Black southerners a new homeland.

Throughout the report, Morgan used the term kanaka, derived from the Hawaiian kānaka ʻōiwi for a person of Hawaiian descent. Many native Hawaiians consider this white appropriation of the term to be a racial slur. The use of the word kanaka in the report allowed Morgan to redefine the term Hawaiian to refer to the geographical, rather than the historical, inhabitants, thus creating a literary deceit that disassociated native Hawaiians from Hawaii.

Others note that the racist bigotry of Chairman Morgan, although widespread at the time, does not necessarily invalidate the evidence gathered during the hearings, especially considering that Morgan was just one of nine senators conducting the investigation. Yet his vote was the deciding factor in the 5–4 decision of whether Stevens acted lawfully.

=== Selective witness list/inherent political bias of senators ===
Morgan Report critics note that Morgan did not visit Hawai`i before issuing his Morgan Report and instead held hearings in Washington, D.C., which, in effect, eliminated any Hawaiian representation of the royalist position. James Henderson Blount represented the royalist position well in his Blount Report, which was nearly exclusively royalist, and by his own testimony in front of the committee. Senator George Gray was particularly anti-annexationist, and brought forward witnesses with testimony critical of the Provisional Government. Of the total of nine senators, four Republicans and three Democrats indicated their support for annexation.

According to Hawaii historian Ralph Kuykendall, witnesses in the Morgan Investigation were picked to make out the best possible case for annexation. Under the guidance of Lorrin Thurston and W. D. Alexander, Morgan made the case against the queen and for annexation. The earlier Blount report did not interview members of the Committee of Safety, and their testimony as well as other evidence put forth during the Morgan Committee hearings contradicted the assertions Blount had made in hist report. Kuykendall described Blount's report as a "lawyer's brief, making the best possible case for the queen and against Stevens", while the Morgan Report "presented an equally effective case for the Provisional Government and Stevens, and against the Queen."

=== Unclear majority opinion ===
A common critique of the Morgan Report is that there was no majority opinion, and that three separate minority opinions existed – Morgan's, the Republicans' and the Democrats'. It is often argued that only Morgan signed the report in its entirety. Hawaiian historian Ralph Kuykendall characterized it this way:

In the end, the majority of the Senate committee on foreign relations found everyone 'not guilty' save the queen, although only Morgan, who wrote the final report, agreed with all parts of it. The Democrats on the committee supported Blount and Willis, imputed the blame to Stevens for his 'inopportune zeal,' and found him deserving of public censure. The Republicans on the committee also filed a report. They refused to censure Blount and Willis; they placed the blame higher up. And at the end, not a single item for future action was recommended in the report.

Towards the end of the main findings section, there is a break after the primary report, followed by a minor disagreement over the constitutionality of Blount's appointment and actions, and then the signatures of the Republicans who joined Morgan, a Democrat, in the rest of the majority opinion. The four Republicans stated their assent to the initial section of the report with the following statement:

We are in entire accord with the essential findings in the exceedingly able report submitted by the chairman of the Committee on Foreign Relations.

The four Democrats who disagreed with the four Republicans, and with Morgan (again, a Democrat), clearly indicate their minority dissent, signing their four names as "Members of Minority". Even though they dissented in regards to whether Minister Stevens should have been censured, they still held the U.S. troops blameless, noting that they remained scrupulously neutral throughout their time ashore:

On the other hand, we are not inclined to censure Capt. Wiltse, commanding the United States war-ship Boston, or the officers of that vessel. Their position was one of extreme delicacy and difficulty, and we appreciate their anxiety to afford protection to the lives and property of American citizens. The force of United States marines of the Boston with their ordinary arms stationed at the American legation, and at the consulate in Honolulu, would have effectually represented the authority and power of the United States Government, and would have afforded whatever protection American interests might have required; and at the same time would have avoided the appearance of coercion or duress, either upon the people of Honolulu or the Queen in the controversy between them.
