= Blount Report =

1893 report on the overthrow of the Kingdom of Hawaii

Blount Report

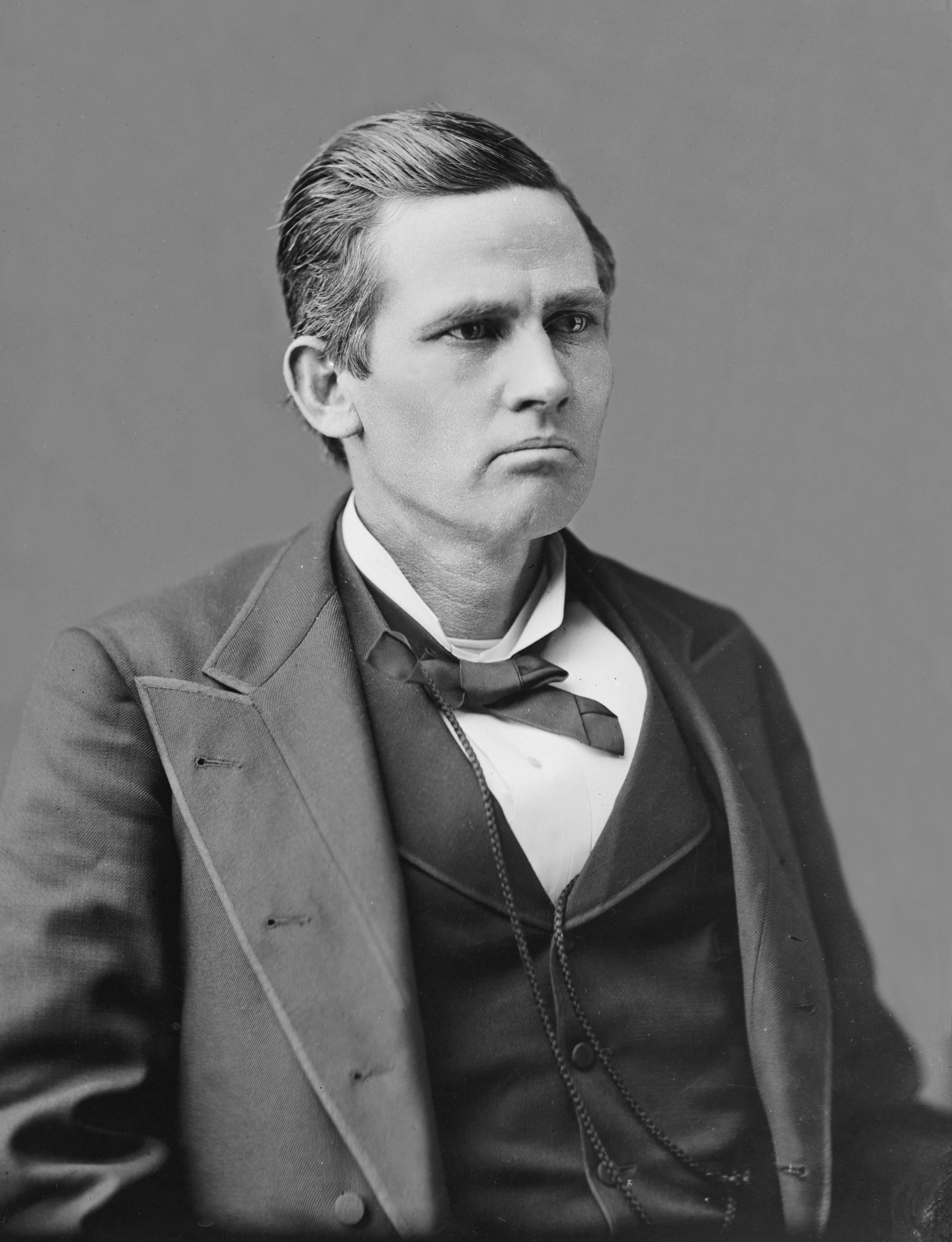
Former Congressman James Henderson Blount was appointed by President Cleveland to conduct the report in 1893

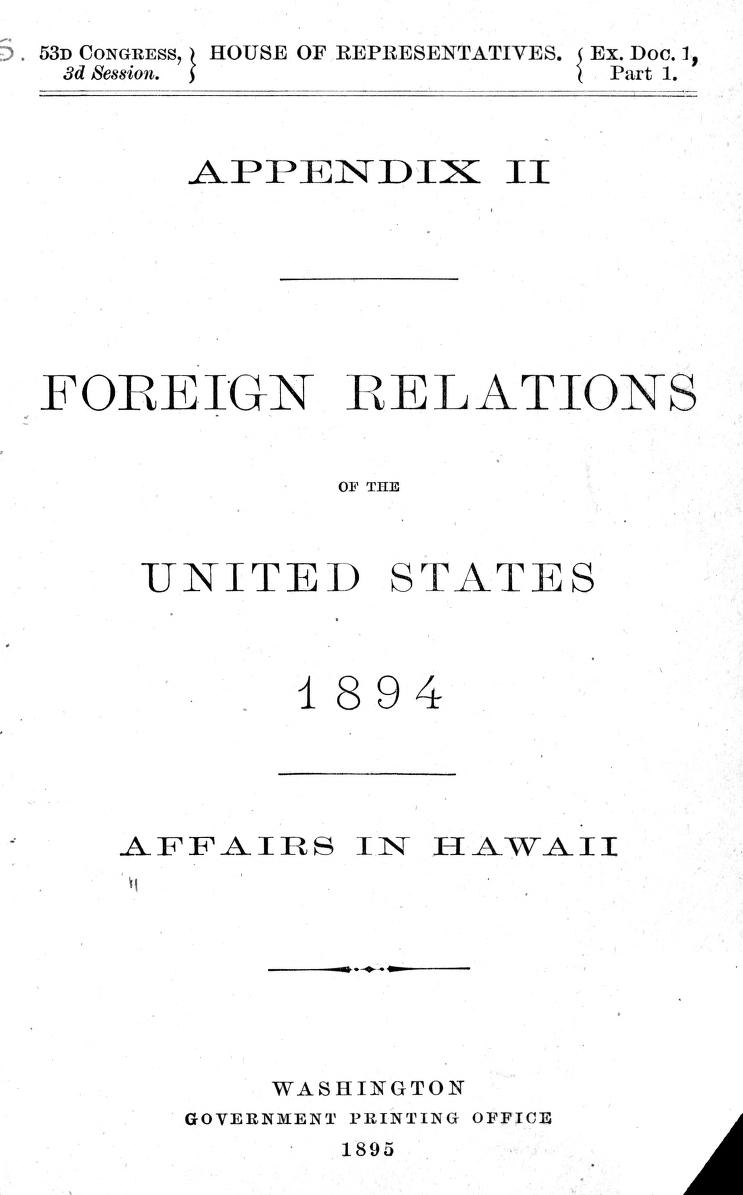
Title page of the report, as printed in Foreign Relations of the United States

The Blount Report is the popular name given to the part of the 1893 United States House of Representatives Foreign Relations Committee Report regarding the overthrow of the Kingdom of Hawaii. The report is formally titled "Affairs in Hawaii," and was conducted by U.S. Commissioner James H. Blount. Blount was appointed by U.S. President Grover Cleveland to investigate the events surrounding the January 1893 overthrow of the Kingdom of Hawaii.

The Blount Report "first provided evidence that officially identified the United States' complicity in the lawless overthrow of the lawful, peaceful government of Hawaii." Blount concluded that U.S. Minister to Hawaii John L. Stevens had carried out unauthorized partisan activities, including the landing of U.S. Marines under a false or exaggerated pretext, to support the anti-royalist conspirators; that these actions were instrumental to the success of the revolution; and that the revolution was carried out against the wishes of a majority of the population of Hawaii.

The Blount Report was followed in 1894 by the Morgan Report, which contradicted Blount's report by concluding that all participants except for Queen Liliʻuokalani were "not guilty".

== Background ==
In January 1893, Queen Liliʻuokalani of Hawaiʻi threatened to replace the "Bayonet Constitution" that had been forced upon the monarchy in 1887 with a new constitution that would restore power to the throne. American and European resident merchants operating as the Committee of Public Safety responded by forcing Liliʻuokalani from power and proclaiming a provisional government. During the overthrow, the American Minister to Hawaii John L. Stevens ordered the landing of U.S. Marines from the USS Boston in Honolulu, ostensibly to protect lives and property.

After the Hawaiian monarchy was overthrown, the Provisional Government of Hawaii immediately sent a treaty of annexation to the expansionist President Benjamin Harrison, who referred it favorably to the Senate for ratification on February 15, 1893. When Grover Cleveland, an anti-expansionist, became President less than three weeks later, he withdrew the treaty from the Senate and appointed former Representative James Henderson Blount as special representative to investigate the events surrounding the overthrow.

== Investigation ==
As special envoy to Hawaii with paramount powers to investigate the circumstances of the revolution and the stability of the Provisional Government, Blount made himself accessible. He obtained testimony from interviews, letters, affidavits, and other documents, including the "Statement of the Hawaiian Patriotic League" and "Memorial on the Hawaiian Crises", but did not have subpoena power. However, one historian has noted that Blount did not interview members of the Committee of Safety, and some questions may have been slanted to build a case for restoration of the queen.

Blount delivered his report to President Cleveland on July 17, 1893 claiming improper U.S. backing for the overthrow had been responsible for its success, and concluded that the Provisional Government lacked popular support. On the basis of Blount's report, President Cleveland dismissed Stevens and began to secretly work towards the restoration of Liliʻuokalani and the constitutional monarchy, conditional upon amnesty to those responsible for the overthrow. The new Minister to Hawaii Albert Willis was unable to persuade the Queen to grant amnesty to the Committee of Public Safety, in return for the throne until December 18. Following this, Willis, acting on behalf of Cleveland, ordered provisional government President Sanford Dole to dissolve his government and restore the Queen. In a letter, Dole vehemently refused Cleveland's demand. The same day, President Cleveland delivered a message to Congress declaring the overthrow improper, calling it "an act of war, committed with the participation of a diplomatic representative of the United States and without authority of Congress."

But for the notorious predilections of the United States Minister for Annexation (John L. Stevens), the Committee of Safety, which should be called the Committee of Annexation, would have never existed. But for the landing of the United States forces upon false pretexts respecting the danger to life and property the committee would never have exposed themselves to the pains and penalties of treason by undertaking the subversion of the Queen's Government. But for the presence of the United States forces in the immediate vicinity and in position to afford all needed protection and support, the committee would not have proclaimed the provisional government from the steps of the Government building.... But for the lawless occupation of Honolulu under false pretexts by the United States forces ... the Queen and her government would have never yielded.

== Response ==
Liliʻuokalani's delay in accepting the terms of her restoration and Dole's flat refusal made Cleveland turn over the matter to the Senate. The Senate authorized the Morgan Report which conducted two months of hearings taken from witnesses under oath and carried out under cross examination. The Morgan Report contradicted Blount's conclusions and exonerated the military and Stevens from blame. Senator George Gray of Delaware, Cleveland's chief spokesperson on the subcommittee, said Morgan examined witnesses "in a very partial and unfair way... to aid the annexationists and injure the President."." Walter Q. Gresham, Cleveland's Secretary of State, said that Morgan was "insincere and meant mischief."

Historian R.S. Kuykendall wrote that "nevertheless, the Morgan hearings did commit to the record the testimony of many participants in the revolution who had been neglected by Blount." Morgan, a Democrat like Cleveland but sympathetic with the expansionist Republicans, seemed to have a vested interest in exonerating both Stevens' actions during the Hawaiian Revolution, as well as Blount's appointment by Cleveland without Congressional approval. Historian W.A. Russ noted, "It seems that the Chairman had two purposes in mind: first, to gainsay everything the Blount Report had asserted; second, to clear the name of every American official and to give the United States a spotless slate."

Cleveland left office and was replaced by pro-annexation President William McKinley in 1897. Hawaii was annexed to the United States the following year.

== Modern relevance ==
In 1993, Congress passed and the President signed an Apology Resolution apologizing for the overthrow of the Kingdom of Hawaii a century before. Based on the Blount Report, other historical analyses, and the claims of Hawaiian sovereignty activists, the Resolution subsequently became a touchstone in the cultural identification of Hawaiians, as well as for the growing Hawaiian sovereignty movement who seek self-government similar to that of Native Americans and Alaskan peoples.
