= Jerome L. Wilson =

American lawyer and politician (1931–2019)

Jerome Linwood Wilson (July 16, 1931 – November 1, 2019) was an American lawyer and politician from New York.

== Life ==
He was born on July 16, 1931, in Washington, D.C., the son of William Jerome Wilson D.Th. (born 1884) and Hazel Hutchins Wilson, a children's book author. He attended Howe Military Academy. He graduated B.A. from Colgate University. He served in the U.S. Air Force until 1957. Then he worked in public relations.

Wilson was a member of the New York State Senate from 1963 to 1966, sitting in the 174th, 175th and 176th New York State Legislatures. He was Chairman of the Committee on Public Welfare in 1965. In November 1966, he ran for Congress in the 17th District but was defeated by the incumbent Republican Theodore R. Kupferman.

Afterwards, Wilson appeared as a commentator on WCBS-TV, and became the Political Editor of the TV station. While in the State Senate and commenting on TV, he attended night classes at New York University School of Law, was graduated J.D., was admitted to the bar in 1971, and practiced law with the firm of Rogers & Wells until 1999. From 1975-1978, Wilson also hosted public TV station WNET/13’s weekly public-affairs program “Dateline New Jersey.”

On November 21, 1985, he married Ursula Anna (Thron) Johnson. They lived in Essex, Connecticut.

His daughter Sarah L. Wilson received in 2001 from President Bill Clinton a recess appointment as a judge of the United States Court of Federal Claims.

Senator Wilson died on November 1, 2019, at his home in Essex.

== Sources ==
New York State Senate
Preceded by John P. Morrissey	New York State Senate; 22nd District; 1963–1965	Succeeded by Samuel L. Greenberg
Preceded by Max Berking	New York State Senate; 30th District; 1966	Succeeded by Harrison J. Goldin
