= List of diplomats of France to Hawaii =

Below is a List of Diplomats of France to Hawaii dealing with diplomatic representation in the Kingdom of Hawaii and its successor states the Provisional Government of Hawaii and the Republic of Hawaii before annexation to the United States in 1898. The main diplomatic representative held the title of Commissioner and Consul of France while the second in command went to the Chancellor of the French Legation who often served as Acting Consul in the absence of the appointed Consul.

== French ambassadors to Hawaii ==
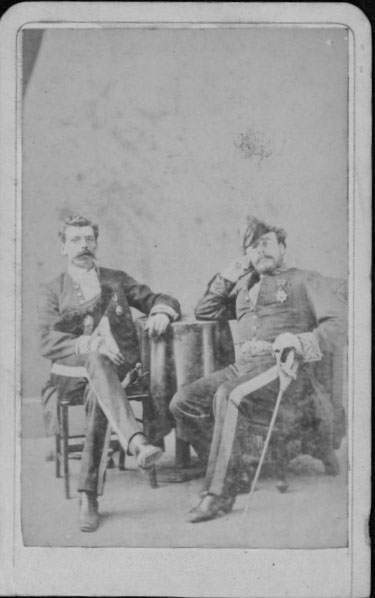
Charles Pernet, chancellor of the French Legation under Consul Ballieu, and Lemonnier at the French Consulate of Honolulu, 1873

- Jules Dudoit (1803–1866), from 1837 to 1848
- Guillaume Patrice Dillon (c. 1812–1857), from 1848 to 1851
- Louis-Émile Perrin (1810–1862), from 1850 to 1862
- Charles de Varigny, 1862 to 1863, acting consul
- Germain Marie Maxime Desnoyers, from 1863 to 1866
- Paul Bérenger, from 1866 to 1869
- Pierre Étienne Théodore Ballieu (1828–1885), from 1869 to 1878.
- Charles Pernet, acting consul
- Eugene Daloz, from 1878 to 1880
- Jules L. Ratard (died 1914), 1881, acting consul
- Henri Feer, from 1880 to 1886
- Adrien Clement Laurent Cochelet, from 1886, 1887, 1888
- Leon Bellaguet, acting consul 1889
- Marie Gabriel Georges Bosseront d'Anglade; 1889 to 1892
- Jean Antoine Vizzavona, 1892 to 1893, acting consul
- Henri Leon Verleye, 1894 to 1895
- Jean Antoine Vizzavona, 1896
- Louis Pierre Vossion, 1897, 1898
