= Hazel Hutchins Wilson =

American author

- Born: April 8, 1898; Portland, Maine, US
- Died: August 20, 1992 (aged 94); Bethesda, Maryland, US
- Other names: Hazel Wilson; H. H. Wilson; Hazel E. Wilson
- Education: Bates College (A.B. 1919); Simmons College (B.S. 1920)
- Occupations: Writer of children's books; Librarian; Book reviewer
- Organizations: American Newspaper Women's Club; Children's Book Guild of Washington, D.C.; Women in Communications
- Spouse: Jerome William Wilson (died 1963)
- Children: Jerome Linwood Wilson

Hazel Hutchins Wilson (April 8, 1898 – August 20, 1992) was an American writer of children's books who turned to writing after a career as a school and university librarian.

== Biography ==
Born in Portland, Maine, she attended Bates College in Lewiston, graduating with a Bachelor of Arts degree in 1919. In 1920 she received a Bachelor of Science degree in library science from Simmons College in Boston.

Wilson's library career began in a high school (1920–23) in Portland and continued at Northeast Missouri State Teacher's College (1923–26) in Kirksville. Thereafter, she became head of the circulation department for the American Library in Paris, France, (1926–28); librarian at Bradford Academy, in Bradford, Massachusetts (1928–29); supervisor of school libraries in Denver (1929–30), and lecturer at George Washington University in Washington, D.C. (1956–67). She helped found the Children's Book Guild of Washington and was at times its president, and she held memberships in the American Newspaper Women's Club and Women in Communications.

Topics for her books ranged from historical figures like George Washington to events in Maine to the antics of a 10-year old named Herbert. Awards for her published work included an Ohioana Award for Island Summer, a Boys Clubs of America Junior Book Award for Thad Owen, a New York Herald Spring Book Festival Honor Book Award for Herbert, and an Edison Award in 1955 for His Indian Brother. She also wrote monthly book reviews for the Washington Evening Star.

Wilson married William Jerome Wilson in 1930, and they had one child, Jerome Linwood Wilson. William Wilson died in 1963. she died in Maryland in 1992 at 94

== Bibliography ==
- The Red Dory (1939)
- The Owen Boys (1947)
- Island Summer (1949)
- Thad Owen (1950)
- Herbert (1950)
- Herbert Again (1951)
- The Story of Lafayette (1952)
- The Story of Anthony Wayne (1953)
- More Fun With Herbert (1954)
- His Indian Brother (1955)
- The Little Marquise: Madame Lafayette (1957)
- The Surprise of Their Lives (1957)
- Tall Ships (1958)
- Jerry's Charge Account (1960)
- Herbert's Homework (1960)
- The Seine: River of Paris (1961)
- The Last Queen of Hawaii (1963)
- Herbert's Space Trip (1965)
- The Years Between: Washington at Home at Mount Vernon, 1783–1789 (1969)
- Herbert's Stilts (1972)

Some of Wilson's papers related to her books about Washington Irving and George Washington are available to the public in the University of Oregon Libraries archives in Eugene.
