= John L. Stevens =

American diplomat (1820–1895)

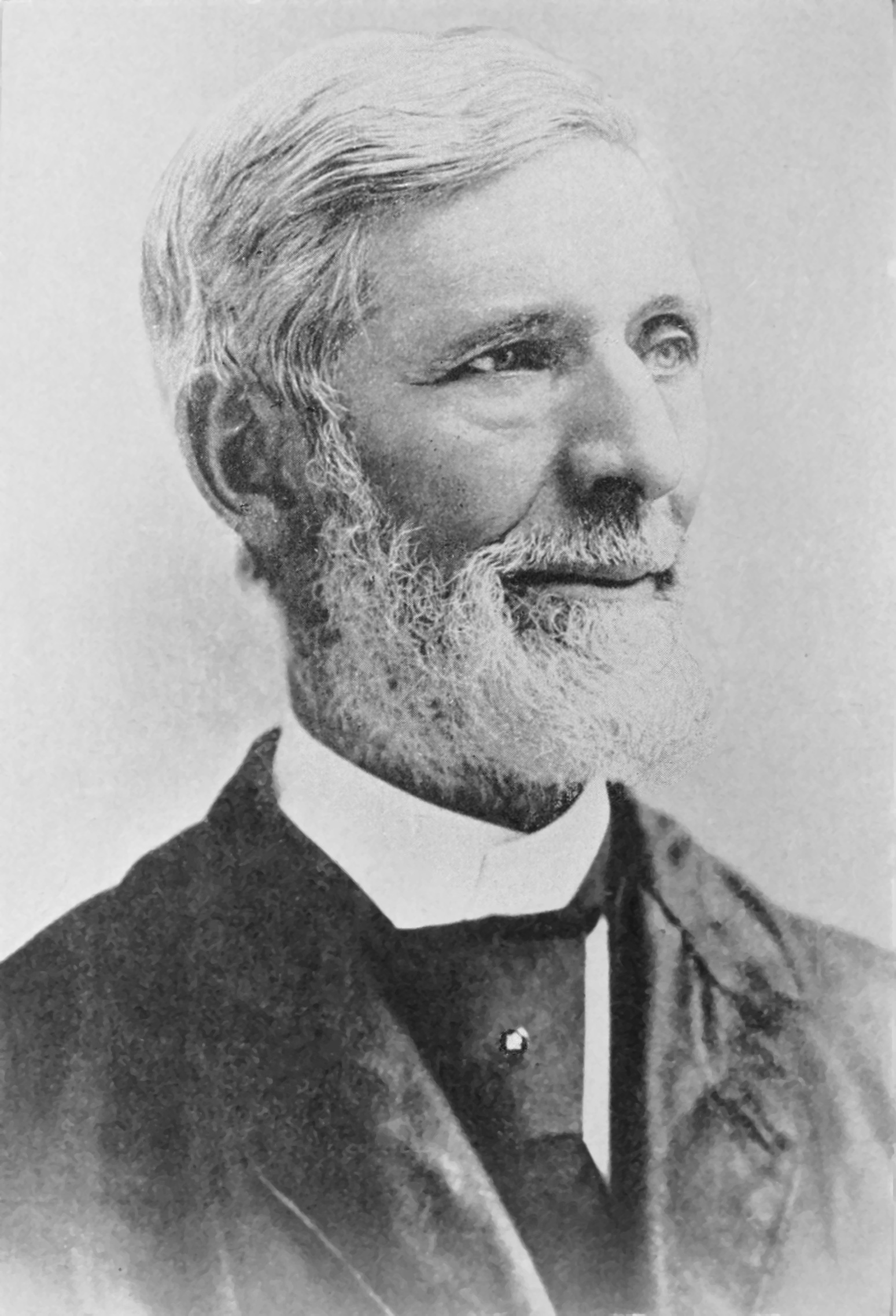

Minister to the Hawaiian Kingdom
- In office September 23, 1889 – May 18, 1893
- Preceded by: George W. Merrill
- Succeeded by: James H. Blount

Personal details
- Born: John Leavitt Stevens; August 1, 1820 Mount Vernon, Maine, U.S.
- Died: February 8, 1895 (aged 74) Augusta, Maine, U.S.
- Spouse: Mary Lowell Smith (m. 1845)
- Children: 4
- Parent(s): John Stevens; Charlotte Lyford Stevens

John Leavitt Stevens (August 1, 1820 – February 8, 1895) was an American politician who served as the United States Minister to the Hawaiian Kingdom in 1893 when he conspired to overthrow Queen Liliuokalani in association with the Committee of Safety, led by Lorrin A. Thurston and Sanford B. Dole – the first Americans attempting to overthrow a foreign government under the auspices of a United States government officer. Apart from his work as a politician and diplomat, he was also a journalist, author, minister and newspaper publisher. He founded the Republican Party in Maine and served as Maine State Senator.

== Early life ==
John Leavitt Stevens was born in 1820 in the town of Mount Vernon, Kennebec County, Maine, to Capt. John Stevens and Charlotte (Lyford) Stevens. He was a lifelong resident of Augusta in the same county, except for his time away at school and his later diplomatic service. Stevens attended Maine Wesleyan Seminary to prepare for a minister's career in the Universalist church, which he served as pastor for a decade, becoming a leader in the anti-slavery movement. (Stevens later became a firm opponent of capital punishment, and as a Maine State Senator urged the legislature to abolish the death penalty).

After a decade as an activist Universalist minister, Stevens was persuaded by his lifelong friend Maine Governor Anson P. Morrill to give up the pulpit and become a newspaper publisher and politician. Stevens took his friend Morrill's advice, left the ministry and became a newspaper editor and publisher before becoming a Maine delegate to the 1860 Republican National Convention.

Six years prior, in 1854, Stevens and his partner James G. Blaine had purchased the newspaper The Kennebec Journal in Augusta, where the pair collaborated for 14 years on editing their publication and pushing the development of Maine's Republican Party. Stevens also played a large role in the 1876 Presidential campaign when he served as Chairman of the Republican State Committee of Maine. He stumped in the states of Ohio, West Virginia and Pennsylvania for the Republican Presidential ticket that year, which won him an appointment as a minister representing the United States government.

== Diplomatic career ==
Stevens joined the United States Department of State and was appointed successively minister to Paraguay, Uruguay, Sweden and Norway, and finally to Hawaii, an appointment pushed by his old partner Blaine, who had risen to United States Secretary of State. When Stevens was named to the Hawaiian post, his title was changed to Minister Plenipotentiary and Envoy Extraordinary, indicating his rise within the State Department.

Soon after his installation in Hawaii, Stevens began writing about the islands, in a steady stream of pamphlets and speeches, including his December 19, 1891, speech delivered at Founder's Day celebrations of the Kamehameha School, entitled Advice to Young Hawaiians, and his later The Hawaiian Situation tract, written with Eugene Chamberlain and William Springer.

Envoy Stevens had gone on-the-record about his manifest destiny views concerning close allies of the United States. Presumably his views reflected those of his former partner, friend, sponsor and now boss at the State Department. In 1881, James G. Blaine had written of the necessity of "drawing the ties of intimate relationship between us and the Hawaiian Islands so as to make them practically a part of the American system without derogation of their absolute independence."

Constitutional reforms in Hawaii in 1887 had widened the gulf between foreign businessmen and native Hawaiian nationalists. In January 1891 the Hawaiian King, who had been sympathetic to the interests of the foreign businessmen, died while on a visit to the United States. He was succeeded by his sister, the Princess, who was crowned Queen Lili'uokalani. The new Queen was known to dislike the restrictive constitution of 1887, and envoy Stevens suspected the Queen's nationalist sympathies. He asked that a United States warship, the USS Boston be stationed indefinitely in Honolulu harbor.

In March 1892 envoy Stevens wrote to United States Secretary of State James G. Blaine, his old newspaper partner, asking how far he might deviate from standard State Department rules if a native revolutionary movement emerged. "The golden hour is near at hand," Stevens later wrote his old partner and friend Blaine. "So long as the islands retain their own independent government there remains the possibility that England or the Canadian Dominion might secure one of the Hawaiian harbors for a coaling station." Added Stevens: "Annexation excludes all dangers of this kind."

The Hawaiian pear is now fully ripe, and this is the golden hour for the United States to pluck it.

— John Leavitt Stevens

Such ambitions had taken on increased importance after the completion of the Canadian Pacific Railway in 1886. Seeking to capitalize on the new transcontinental link in Canada, Anglo-Canadian business interests were said to welcome the Hawaiian Islands being made into a British protectorate. For aggressive manifest destiny advocates such as Stevens, the telegraphing of British intentions – even by diplomatic innuendo – signaled the need for a preemptive American response.

== Overthrow and Stevens's response ==
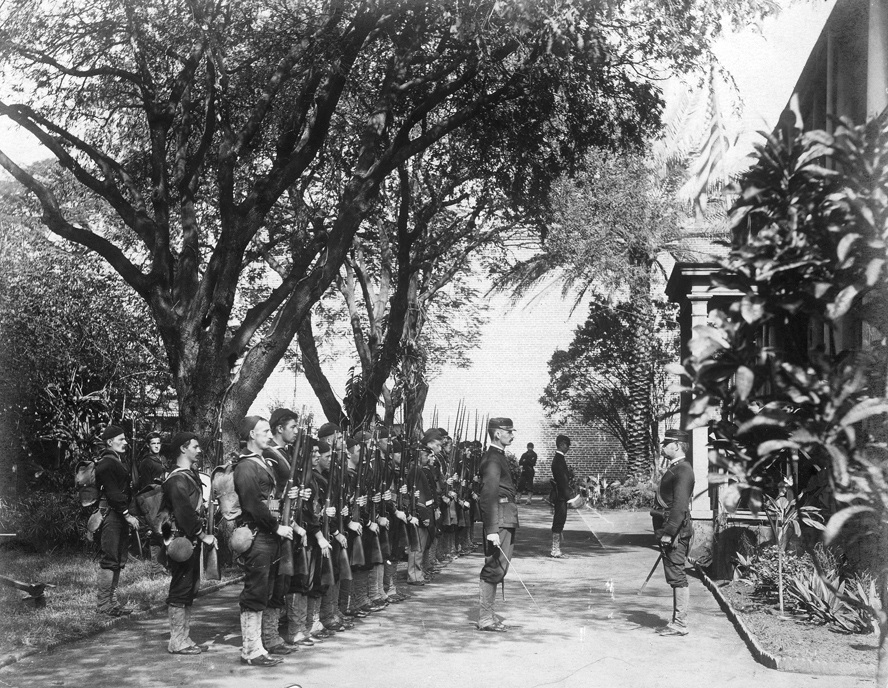
Fine screen halftone reproduction of a photograph of the ship's landing force on duty at the Arlington Hotel, Honolulu, at the time of the overthrow of the Hawaiian monarchy, January 1893

At the time of the Bayonet Constitution of 1887 Grover Cleveland was president, and his secretary of state Thomas F. Bayard sent written instructions to the American minister George W. Merrill that in the event of another revolution in Hawaii, it was a priority to protect American commerce, lives and property. Bayard specified, "the assistance of the officers of our Government vessels, if found necessary, will therefore be promptly afforded to promote the reign of law and respect for orderly government in Hawaii." In July 1889, there was a small scale rebellion, and Minister Merrill landed Marines to protect Americans; the State Department explicitly approved his action. Merrill's replacement, minister John L. Stevens, read those official instructions, and followed them in his controversial actions of 1893.

On January 14, 1893, envoy Stevens met with two other men concerned about American territorial interests in the Pacific. That night, Stevens and American-Hawaiian businessmen Sanford Dole and Lorrin Thurston met to hatch "an audacious plot to overthrow Hawaii's Queen and bring her country into the United States," writes New York Times reporter Stephen Kinzer in his book Overthrow.

The immediate event which precipitated the meeting was Queen Lili'uokalani's attempt to promulgate a new constitution which would have restored many of the powers of the monarchy that existed prior to the forced promulgation of the "Bayonet Constitution" in 1887 that reduced the power of the Hawaiian monarch and rescinded voting rights to much of the population. The Queen's cabinet refused to go along with the planned new constitution, and Queen Liliʻuokalani temporarily yielded. But to the ardent Annexationists the volatile situation provided an opportunity that they seized. The Annexation Club morphed into a Committee of Safety; it shepherded documents drafted to establish a provisional government.

The Committee of Safety expressed concern for the safety and property of American residents in Honolulu. Minister Stevens, advised about these supposed threats to non-combatant American lives and property by the Committee of Safety, obliged their request and summoned a company of uniformed U.S. Marines from the Boston and two companies of U.S. sailors to land on the Kingdom and take up positions in strategic locations in Honolulu on the afternoon of January 16, 1893. 162 sailors and Marines aboard the Boston came ashore well-armed but under orders of neutrality. They were positioned around Royal residences and Hawaiian government installations, not around United States citizens' quarters. Having observed the troops' march up the street, the Queen was heard to remark that the Marines were finishing what the "missionaries" started. The presence of the Marines served effectively in intimidating royalist defenders. Historian William Russ states, "the injunction to prevent fighting of any kind made it impossible for the monarchy to protect itself." Due to the Queen's desire "to avoid any collision of armed forces, and perhaps the loss of life" for her subjects and after some deliberation, at the urging of advisers and friends, the Queen ordered her forces to surrender. The Honolulu Rifles took over government buildings, disarmed the Royal Guard, and declared a Provisional Government.

Minister Stevens recognized the new government, giving his blessing on behalf of the United States Department of State, and commissioners were immediately dispatched to Washington to request that Hawaii be annexed by the United States. On February 9, 1893, Stevens acted preemptively, establishing a protectorate pending negotiations for annexation. On February 16, President Harrison sent a message to the Senate, formally requesting annexation of the Hawaiian kingdom.

But President Cleveland, immediately following his inauguration, sent a message to the Senate, canceling all further talk of annexation. He then sent a commissioner to the Islands to assess the situation, who reported that the newly established protectorate be withdrawn as unnecessary. Envoy Stevens immediately resigned and returned to Maine, where he spent his time in public denunciation of the new administration's Hawaiian policy.

The Blount Report commissioned by President Grover Cleveland was submitted on July 17, 1893, and found Stevens guilty of inappropriate conduct in support of the conspiracy to overthrow Hawaii's Queen. Answering the charges from his Augusta, Maine, home, Stevens supplied his rationale: the Queen was immoral, and so needed to be dethroned. The later Morgan investigation conducted by the U.S. Congress, which led to the Morgan Report on February 26, 1894, found Stevens and other U.S. agents not guilty, after which Cleveland abandoned the matter because of lack of Congressional support. Both the Blount and Morgan Reports are cited by partisans on both sides to support their claims about the legitimacy or lack thereof of the overthrow.

In 1993, Congress passed and the President signed an Apology Resolution apologizing for the overthrow of the Kingdom of Hawaii a century before. Based on the Blount Report and other historical analyses, the Resolution subsequently became a touchstone in the cultural and political identification of many native Hawaiians.

== Forced retirement and later life ==
Following his forced retirement in 1893 because of the overthrow of Hawaii, Stevens spent his time lecturing and writing and working in Republican Party circles. He died two years later. During his retirement, Stevens worked to rehabilitate his image following his humiliating firing by the new President. In 1894, the former preacher and newspaper editor published Picturesque Hawaii: A Charming Description of Her Unique History, Strange People, Exquisite Climate, Wondrous Volcanoes, Luxurious Productions, Beautiful Cities, Corrupt Monarchy, Recent Revolution and Provisional Government, a strange volume of part memoir, part travelogue and part political tract meant to provide a rationale for his actions in the Islands.

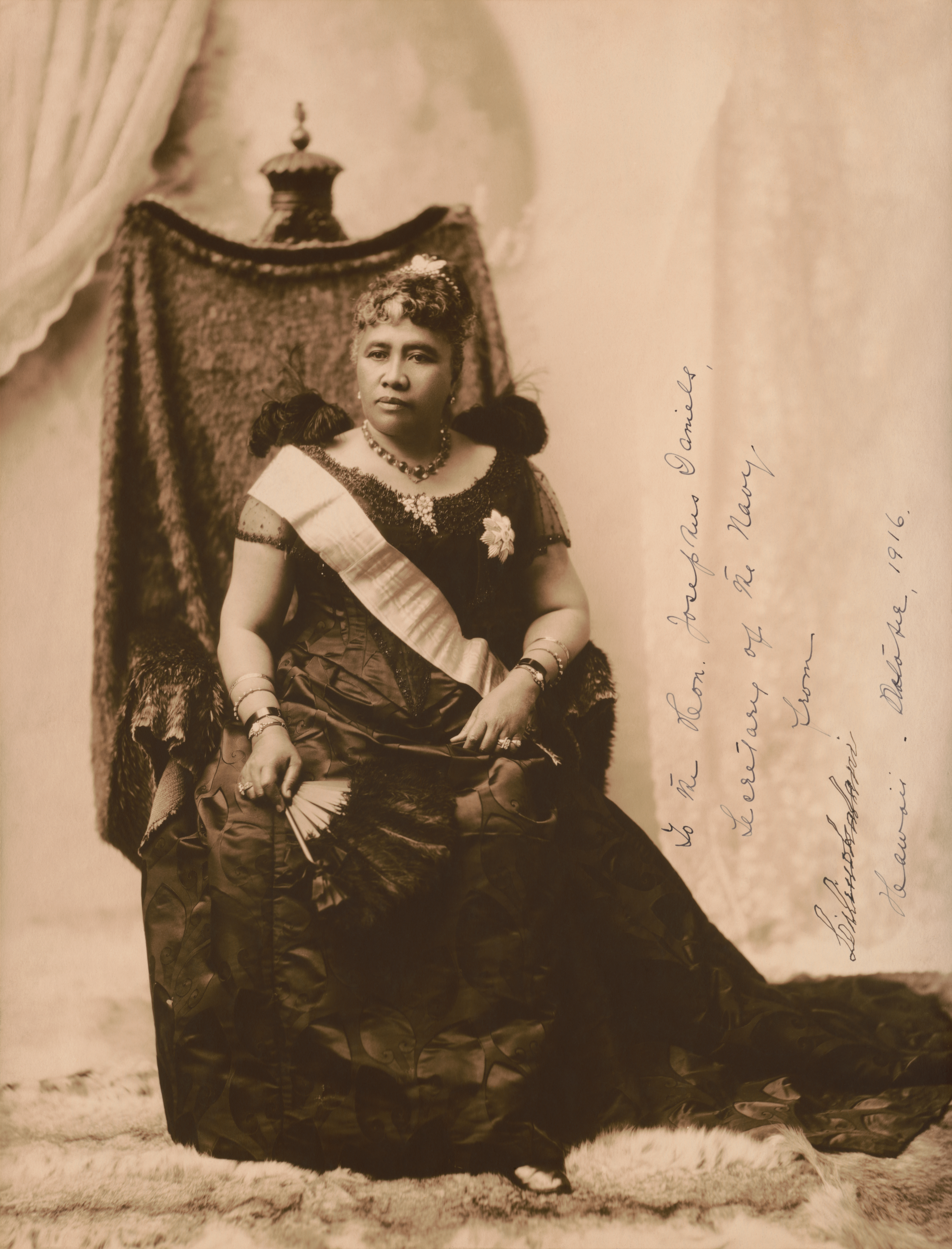
Queen Regnant Lili'uokalani of Hawaii.

During his life, Stevens authored several other books, including a two-volume biography of Swedish King Gustavus Adolphus and his involvement in the Thirty Years War, praised by The New York Times as showing "extensive research and much patient reading." The prolific Stevens also authored assorted letters, speeches and tracts, many of them advocating his Manifest Destiny views on American foreign policy. Stevens was awarded an Honorary Doctorate of Laws by Tufts College in 1882. American author and orientalist William Elliot Griffis dedicated his book America in the East to Stevens, who, Griffis wrote, "believing that the lives and property of American citizens abroad ought to be as well protected as if they were at home, acting according to his faith."

John L. Stevens was married to the former Mary Lowell Smith of Hallowell, Maine, on May 10, 1845. The couple had one son and three daughters, one of whom drowned on January 20, 1893 – three days after the Hawaiian overthrow Stevens helped engineer – and an event said to have sent the diplomat into crippling depression.

Hon. John L. Stevens died at his home in Augusta, Maine, at 4 a.m. on February 8, 1895, of heart disease.

In 1898 the United States government officially annexed Hawaii. A seven-piece silver service made of melted silver dollars and given to Stevens after his Hawaiian tenure by pro-Annexation forces in Hawaii is still owned by Stevens's descendants. The tea service, and the career of its controversial owner, were the subject of a Public Broadcasting Service documentary in 1998 entitled The Nation Within. A one-act play entitled "Cry for the Gods" was written by Judge Paul Handy which presents a dramatized, fictional meeting between Stevens and the Queen on the night of January 16, 1893. It has been performed in Maryland and as part of the Capital Fringe Festival in Washington State.

== See also ==
- James G. Blaine
- Kalakaua
- Liliuokalani
- Lorrin A. Thurston
- Overthrow of the Hawaiian Kingdom
- Paraguayan War
- Sanford B. Dole

Diplomatic posts
Preceded by Robert C. Kirk (Uruguay); Martin T. McMahon (Paraguay)	United States Minister Resident, Uruguay; 6 July 1870–19 May 1873	Succeeded by John C. Caldwell
Preceded by Robert C. Kirk (Uruguay); Martin T. McMahon (Paraguay)	United States Minister Resident, Paraguay; 26 August 1870–19 May 1873	Succeeded by John C. Caldwell
Preceded by George W. Merrill	United States Minister Resident and Envoy Extraordinary & Minister Plenipotentiary, Hawaii; 23 September 1889–18 May 1893	Succeeded by James H. Blount
