= Kathleen Dickenson Mellen =

American Hawaiian author (1895–1969)

- Born: Kathleen Dickenson; May 10, 1895; Castlewood, Virginia, U.S.
- Died: August 1, 1969 (aged 74); Honolulu, Oahu, Hawaii, U.S.
- Burial place: Kawaiahaʻo Church Cemetery, Honolulu, Hawaii, U.S.
- Other names: Kathleen D. Mellen
- Education: Sullins College, Curry School of Expression
- Spouse: George Mellen (m. 1922–)

Kathleen Dickenson Mellen (née Kathleen Dickenson; 1895–1969) was an American author. She was a long time resident of the Territory of Hawaii, and published many books on Hawaii's history and culture.

== Life and career ==
Kathleen Dickenson was born on May 10, 1895, at Walrose House in Castlewood, Virginia. She graduated from Sullins College in Bristol, Virginia; and attended the Curry School of Expression (now Curry College) in Milton, Massachusetts.

In 1922, she married George Mellen, a newspaper journalist. The Mellens moved to the Territory of Hawaii in 1922. During the President Calvin Coolidge administration, she was an official host. Mellen became close friends with Princess Abigail Campbell Kawānanakoa.

She died on August 1, 1969, in Honolulu, and is buried at the Kawaiahaʻo Church Cemetery. More than 300 people attended her funeral. After her death in August 1969, the U.S. Congressional Record recorded her memorial.

== Publications ==
- Mellen, Kathleen Dickenson (1947). In a Hawaiian Valley. New York City, NY: Hastings House.
- Mellen, Kathleen Dickenson (1948). Two Views of Hawaii; In a Hawaiian Valley. Madge Tennent (Illustrator). New York City, NY: Hastings House.
- Mellen, Kathleen Dickenson (1949). The Lonely Warrior: The Life and Times of Kamehameha the Great of Hawaii. New York City, NY: Hastings House.
- Mellen, Kathleen Dickenson (1952). The Magnificent Matriarch: Kaahumanu, Queen of Hawaii. New York City, NY: Hastings House.
- Mellen, Kathleen Dickenson (1954). Hawaiian Majesty. Melrose.
- Mellen, Kathleen Dickinson (1956). The Gods Depart: A Saga of the Hawaiian Kingdom, 1832–1873. New York City, NY: Hastings House.
- Mellen, Kathleen Dickenson (1958). An Island Kingdom Passes: Hawaii Becomes American. New York City, NY: Hastings House.
- Mellen, Kathleen Dickenson (1963). Hawaiian Heritage: A Brief Illustrated History. New York City, NY: Hastings House.
- Black, Cobey; Mellen, Kathleen Dickenson (1965). Princess Pauahi Bishop and Her Legacy. Honolulu, HI: Kamehameha Schools Press.
