= Marie Gabriel Georges Bosseront d'Anglade =

French diplomat (1858–1929)

Marie Gabriel Georges Bosseront d'Anglade (pseudonym Georges Sauvin; 20 January 1858 – February 1929) was a French diplomat to the Kingdom of Hawaii during the late 19th century. He wrote Un Royaume Polynésien: Îles Hawaï, an account of life in Hawaii from 1889 to 1893. He also served many other consular posts around the world.

== Life ==
He was born in Paris on 20 January 1858. His father Gustave Armand Bosseront d'Anglade was a high-ranking official in the French foreign ministry and his older brother François Antoine René (1853–1942) also served as a diplomat. He earned a law degree and started working in 1875 for the French consulate. In 1884, he was appointed to Montevideo, Uruguay as consul suppléant, assistant consul. In 1886, he was appointed deputy consul for London. In 1888, he was assigned as the new Commissioner and Consul of France in Honolulu, the capital of the Kingdom of Hawaii.

Bosseront d'Anglade arrived in Honolulu in January 1889 and served as Commissioner and Consul of France until 1892. In 1889, Kalākaua and his Cabinet ministers (composed largely of members of the Reform Party) were renegotiating a new reciprocity treaty with the United States which would have made Hawaii a virtual American protectorate. The British commissioner James Hay Wodenhouse and Bosseront d'Anglade lodged a protest against the Minister of Foreign Affairs Jonathan Austin. They stated "we did not think our Governments would approve of such a project as that of placing these Islands under the sole guarantee of their independence by the United States". In 1891, Bosseront d'Anglade accompanied the new Queen Liliuokalani to the leper settlement at Kalaupapa on Molokai, the first visit she had made to the settlement as reigning monarch, and gave a description of the settlement that was described as "not wanting" by The Pacific Commercial Advertiser.

Using the pseudonym Georges Sauvin, he wrote Un Royaume Polynésien: Îles Hawaï, an account of life in Hawaii from 1889 to 1893, including events surrounding the reigns of King Kalākaua and his sister Queen Liliuokalani. This book was translated in 1987 by historian Alfons L. Korn under the title A Tree in Bud: the Hawaiian Kingdom, 1889–1893. He also wrote Autour de Chicago: Notes sur les États-Unis (translated as "Around Chicago and Notes on the United States").

Bosseront d'Anglade did not witness the overthrow of the Kingdom of Hawaii in 1893; he left for France in 1892 on a leave of absence. He was succeeded by Jean Antoine Vizzavona, chancellor of the French Legation, as acting consul from 1892 until 1894. During this time, he was still considered the official consul until Henri Leon Verleye was appointed to replace him in 1894. Bosseront d'Anglade would also later serve as French consular agent for New Orleans, Milan, Warsaw, Barcelona and New York City.

He died in February 1929, in Bordeaux.

== See also ==
- List of diplomats of France to Hawaii

== Bibliography ==
- Arceneaux, William (1999). No Spark of Malice: The Murder of Martin Begnaud. Baton Rouge: Louisiana State University Press. ISBN 978-0-8071-3025-4. OCLC 41380330.
- Forbes, David W., ed. (2003). Hawaiian National Bibliography, 1780–1900: 1881–1900. Vol. 4. Honolulu: University of Hawaii Press. ISBN 978-0-8248-2636-9. OCLC 123279964.
- France (1887). Annuaire diplomatique et consulaire de la République Française. Paris: Imprimerie Nationale. OCLC 7087084.
- Kuykendall, Ralph Simpson (1967). The Hawaiian Kingdom 1874–1893, The Kalakaua Dynasty. Vol. 3. Honolulu: University of Hawaii Press. ISBN 978-0-87022-433-1. OCLC 500374815.
- United States Department of State (November 18, 1914). Register of the Department of State. Washington, DC: U.S. Government Printing Office. OCLC 1714371.
