= Andrew (surname) =

Andrew is sometimes used as a surname. It is derived from the given name Andrew.

Notable people with the surname include:

- Amy Andrew (born 1986), New Zealand professional boxer
- Ariane Andrew (born 1987), US professional wrestler
- Bruce Andrew (1908–1986), footballer
- Calvin Andrew (born 1986), English footballer
- Cathy Andrew, New Zealand nursing educator
- Charles A. Andrew (1857–1932), American politician from Maryland
- Christopher Andrew (disambiguation) (several people)
- Clara Andrew (1862 – 1939) a British adoption pioneer, activist.
- Danny Andrew (born 1990), English footballer
- Gareth Andrew, English cricketer
- Gerardine Andrew, Singaporean prostitute and convicted killer
- Keith Andrew (1929–2010), English cricketer
- Janice Andrew, Australian swimmer
- Joe Andrew (born 1960), US politician
- John Andrew (rugby union, born 1993) (born 1993) Irish professional rugby player
- John Albion Andrew (1818–1867), Massachusetts politician
- Jorge Andrew (born 1951), Venezuelan tennis player
- Neale Andrew (born 1958), English sculptor
- Neil Andrew (1944–2026), Australian politician and former Speaker of the Australian House of Representatives
- Ricky Andrew (born 1989) Irish rugby union player
- Robert Andrew (disambiguation) (several people)
- Sam Houston Andrew III (1941–2015), US musician
- Skylet Andrew (born 1962), table tennis player
- Stuart Andrew (born 1971), British Conservative politician
- Wallace W. Andrew (1850–1919), American politician
- William Andrew (disambiguation) (several people)

== See also ==
- Andrew § Andrew-surname, other similar surnames
