= Lorrin Andrews =

American judge (1795–1868)

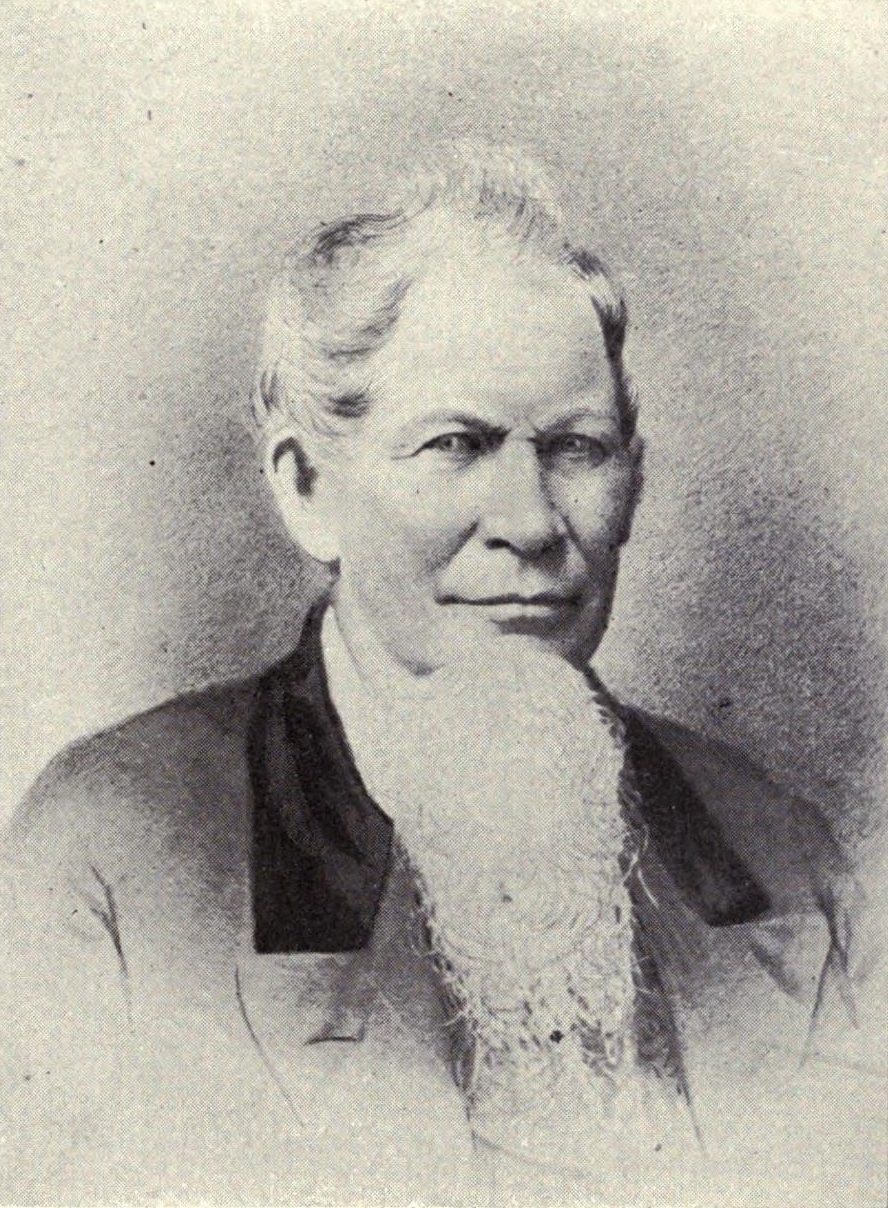
- Andrews, circa 1865
- Born: April 29, 1795; East Windsor, Connecticut
- Died: September 29, 1868 (aged 73); Honolulu, Hawaii
- Occupations: Missionary, publisher and judge
- Known for: Founding of Lahainaluna Seminary
- Spouse: Mary Wilson
- Children: 7

Lorrin Andrews (April 29, 1795 – September 29, 1868) was an early American missionary to Hawaii and a judge. He opened the first post-secondary school for Hawaiians called Lahainaluna Seminary, prepared a Hawaiian dictionary and several works on the literature and antiquities of the Hawaiians. His students published the first newspaper, and were involved in the first case of counterfeiting currency in Hawaii. He later served as a judge and became a member of Hawaii's first Supreme Court.

== Life ==
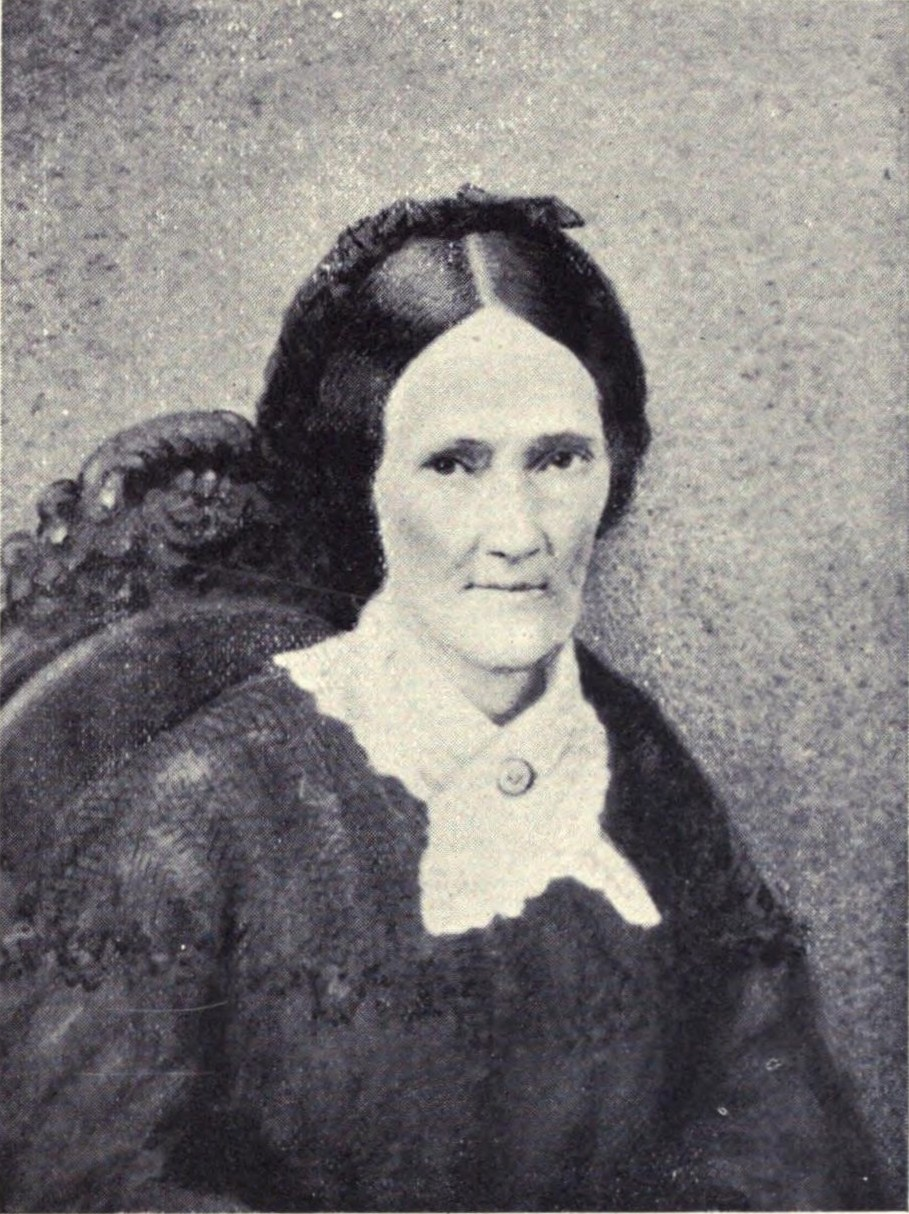
Mary Andrews (1804–1879).

Lorrin Andrews was born in East Windsor, Connecticut, on April 29, 1795. He graduated from Jefferson College, Pennsylvania, and attended Princeton Theological Seminary. He married Mary Ann Wilson from Washington, Kentucky on August 16, 1827. The marriage produced seven children: son Lorrin Jr. (1828–1857), daughters Elizabeth Maria (1830–1868), Sarah (October 10, 1832 – 1899), sons Robert Wilson (1837–1921), Samuel (1839–1911), William (1842–1919), and daughter Mary Ellen (1844–1930). Sarah would marry Asa Goodale Thurston, son of Asa and Lucy Goodale Thurston, earlier missionaries from the first company to the islands. Sarah's son, Lorrin Andrews Thurston, played a pivotal role in later Hawaiian history.

He sailed for the Hawaiian Islands in November 1827, on the ship Parthian. The physician Gerrit P. Judd was also in this third company from the American Board of Commissioners for Foreign Missions.

He was assigned to the mission at Lahaina, Hawaii on the island of Maui which had been established by William Richards in 1823.

He moved to Honolulu in 1845 where he died on September 29, 1868.

== Work ==
One of his first tasks after arriving in March 1828 was to learn the Hawaiian language. On his voyage he had already transcribed a list of Hawaiian words which had been sent back to the New England mission office in 1827. In June 1831 the mission hoped to establish a seminary on Maui, since it was somewhat centrally located among the Hawaiian Islands. Andrews was selected to run the school. He and Richards suggested a site about two miles inland from the village of Lahaina, which was later called Lahainaluna for "upper Lahaina".

On September 5, 1831, classes began in thatched huts with 25 young married Hawaiian men. It was the first college west of the Rocky Mountains.

The students built a stone building by 1832. The first classes were reading and writing, since the Hawaiian language was only oral before the missionaries. Next Arithmetic and Geography were added. By the end of the second year, enrollment had reached 85.

Andrews served as principal, and then professor for ten years. Notable early students include David Malo (class of 1835) and Samuel Kamakau (class of 1837).

By May 1832 he helped translate the New Testament of the Bible into Hawaiian, which would prove to be part of a long and collaborative effort. Other ministers involved included Richards, Asa Thurston, and Hiram Bingham I.

=== First newspaper ===
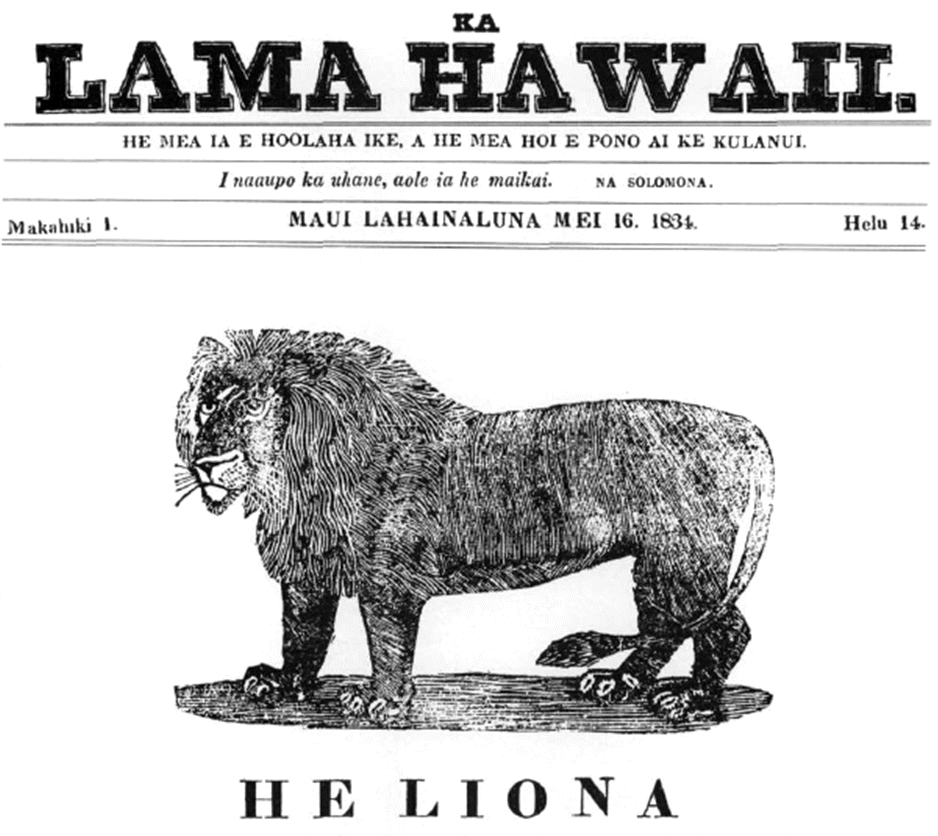
Headline from May 16, 1834, issue of Ka Lama Hawaii

In December 1833, an old Ramage press was shipped from Honolulu and installed in a small thatched roof building on the school campus by January 1834. The manual flat-bed technology was not very different from that used by Benjamin Franklin almost 100 years earlier. The press had been sent along with printer Elisha Loomis (a distant cousin via his mother) on the first company of missionaries in 1820, and used to print a few hymnals and spelling books. Loomis had to return in 1827, probably bringing with him the word list Andrews had studied. The ministers had to take over managing the printing while training Hawaiians. Although Andrews had only worked briefly as an assistant in a printer's office, he taught classes in printing at Lahainaluna. Students learned how to set type, operate the old press, create copper engravings and bind books.

On February 14, 1834, about 200 copies of the first Hawaiian newspaper were printed, a four-page weekly called Ka Lama Hawaiʻi (The Hawaiian Luminary). By February 1836, he published a list of about 5,700 words in the Hawaiian language that had been edited through the years (based on Elisha Loomis' work) using the press. In June 1836, the school changed from admitting only married adult men to a boarding school for children aged 10 to 20 years. He published the first Hawaiian grammar book in 1838.

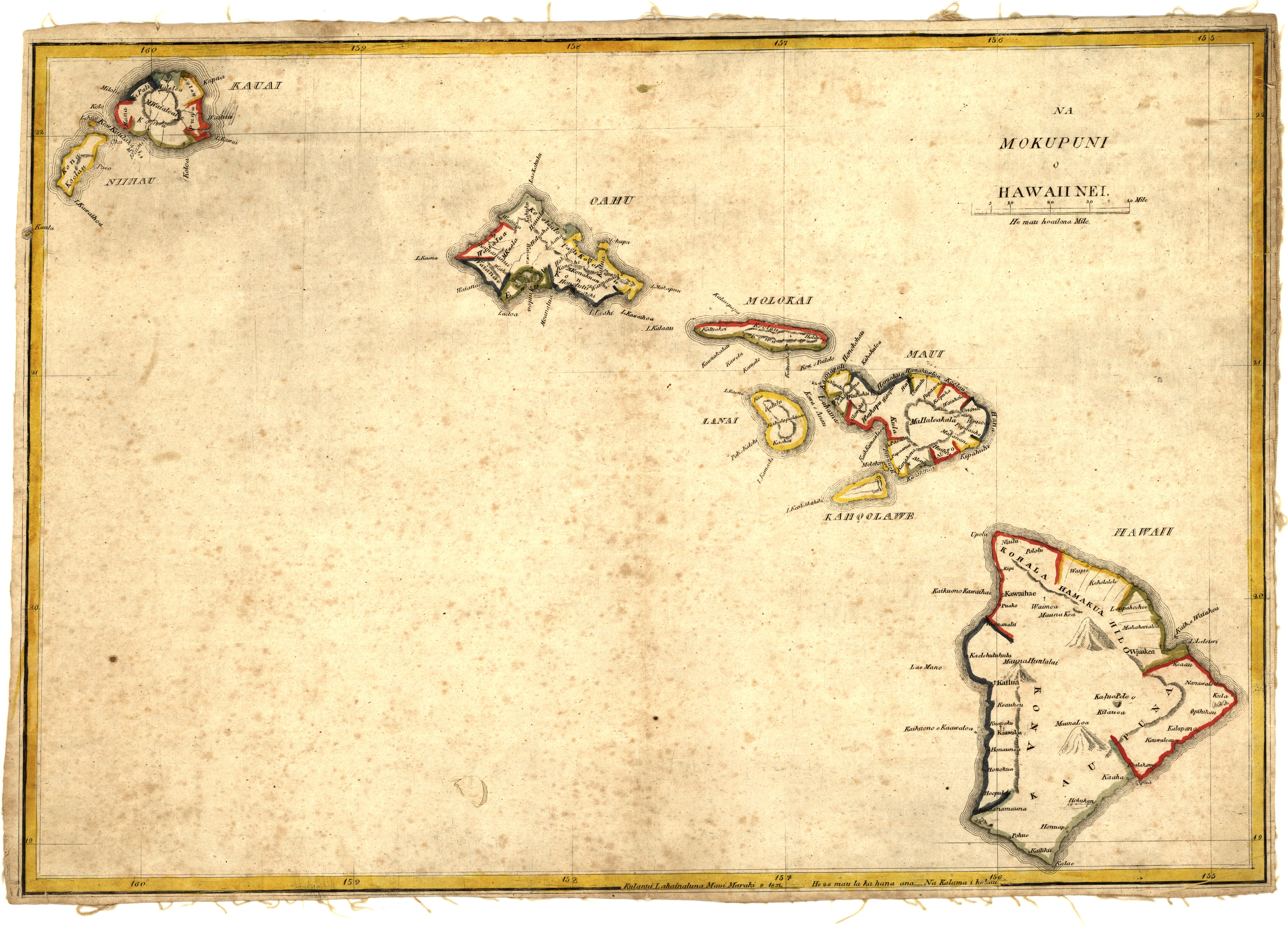
Na Mokupuni o Hawaii Nei, a map of the Hawaiian Islands published by his students in 1837

His students were to become authors and publishers of newspapers and books throughout Hawaii. In 1837 work began on a more substantial building called Hale Paʻi (printing house). It was made of stone, mortar made by burning coral, and timbers hauled to the site from the forests on the opposite side of the island.

Starting in about 1835, the students compiled a classic collection of stories about ancient Hawaiian life and traditions titled Ka Moʻo o lelo Hawaii ("The Hawaiian Antiquities"). David Malo had served as court historian and genealogist during the formation of the kingdom, so is generally credited as the major source. Sheldon Dibble first organized a printing of the book in the Hawaiian language about 1838 (reprinted in Hawaiian in 2005). In 1858 more stories were added and a second Hawaiian edition was published. The book was translated by Nathaniel Bright Emerson and published in English in 1898, and again in 1951 and 1987 editions. Andrews had his students write a history of Kamehameha I, but the manuscript has been lost.

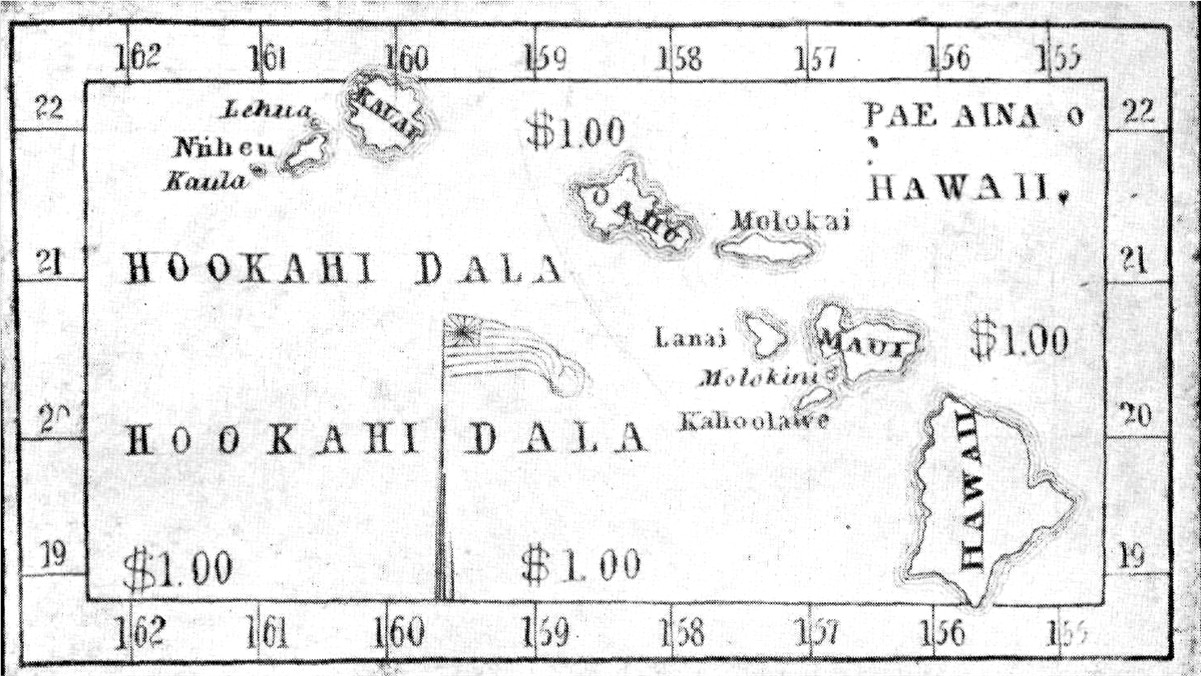
A map of the islands on the one dollar bill

He left the mission in April 1842 because the board in New England continued to accept funds from slave owning states. This demonstration of his moral character would lead to his next career as a judge. He served as a seamen's chaplain at Lahaina, which had become a popular port for the whaling industry. He remained involved with publishing and in 1843 directed the printing some of the first paper currency issued in the Kingdom. Since the nation had no official currency of its own, it was based on the U.S. Dollar and called hoʻokahi dala. Five smaller paper denominations were also printed. By 1844 a student was expelled for counterfeiting, forcing all the paper money to be re-issued with secret marks.

=== Law ===
There were very few members of the law profession in the Kingdom of Hawaii; the first lawyer arrived in 1844. On September 19, 1845, the Governor of Oahu Mataio Kekūanaōʻa appointed Andrews to be judge of foreign cases despite the lack of any formal training. In June 1846 local judges were added for the other islands, and he was given appellate jurisdiction as well as handling major original cases. His next project was to make court procedures more formalized and uniform. He began by issuing twenty-one rules of practice in July 1846. There were only three lawyers at this time besides Attorney General John Ricord, who probably helped draft the rules. In 1847 his position was officially named the "Superior Court of Law and Equity".

Starting in 1846 he served as secretary of the King's Privy Council, keeping records in both English and Hawaiian. William Little Lee drafted a judiciary bill to implement the provisions of the 1852 Constitution of the Kingdom of Hawaii. It was passed by the Privy Council and signed by King Kamehameha III who appointed the incumbents of the Superior Court to the new Supreme Court of Hawaii. Lee became Chief Justice, and Lorrin Andrews and John Papa ʻĪʻī associate justices. Before then, the Supreme Court was essentially the King and some high chiefs. A smallpox epidemic caused an increase in the number of probate cases, and in December 1854 Andrews became the lone judge in a special court for divorce and probate.

=== More publishing ===
He resigned from the court in 1855, and went back to his publishing. He worked again on Bible translation, publishing the books of John, Jude, and Proverbs. He translated and published some of the important chants from Hawaiian culture. He combined his 1835 work with several other word lists and published a larger Hawaiian dictionary containing about 15,000 words in 1865. This dictionary has been the base of many others through history. Although his eyesight failed, he employed assistants to act as scribes until he died in 1868.

== Legacy ==
Lorrin Andrews' grandson Lorrin A. Thurston would follow him and also become a lawyer without any formal training.

Lahainaluna Seminary eventually split into Lahainaluna High School which exists today as a public high school, and what evolved into the University of Hawaii. His works were valuable in the reconstruction of Hawaiian language and culture that started in the 1980s.

Hale Paʻi was opened to the public as a museum in 1960. However, the building fell into disrepair. It was listed on the National Register of Historic Places on May 13, 1976. The Lahaina Restoration Foundation restored the building and re-opened it in 1983.

His grandson Lorrin Andrews became Attorney General of the Territory of Hawaii in 1903.

=== Family tree ===
Thurston Hawaii family tree

Asa Thurston (1787–1868)	Lucy Goodale (1795–1876)	Lorrin Andrews (1795–1868)	Mary Wilson
William Cornelius Shipman (1824–1861)	Persis Goodale Thurston Taylor (1821–1906)	Asa Goodale Thurston (1827–1859)	Sarah Andrews (1832–1899)
William Herbert Shipman (1854–1943)	Margaret Clarissa; Shipman	Lorrin A. Thurston (1858–1931)	Harriet Elvira Potter
William Twigg-Smith (1883-1950)	Margaret Carter Thurston (1895–1976)	Lorrin Potter Thurston (1899-1984)
Thurston Twigg-Smith (1921-2016)
