= Asa Thurston =

American Christian missionary (1787–1868)

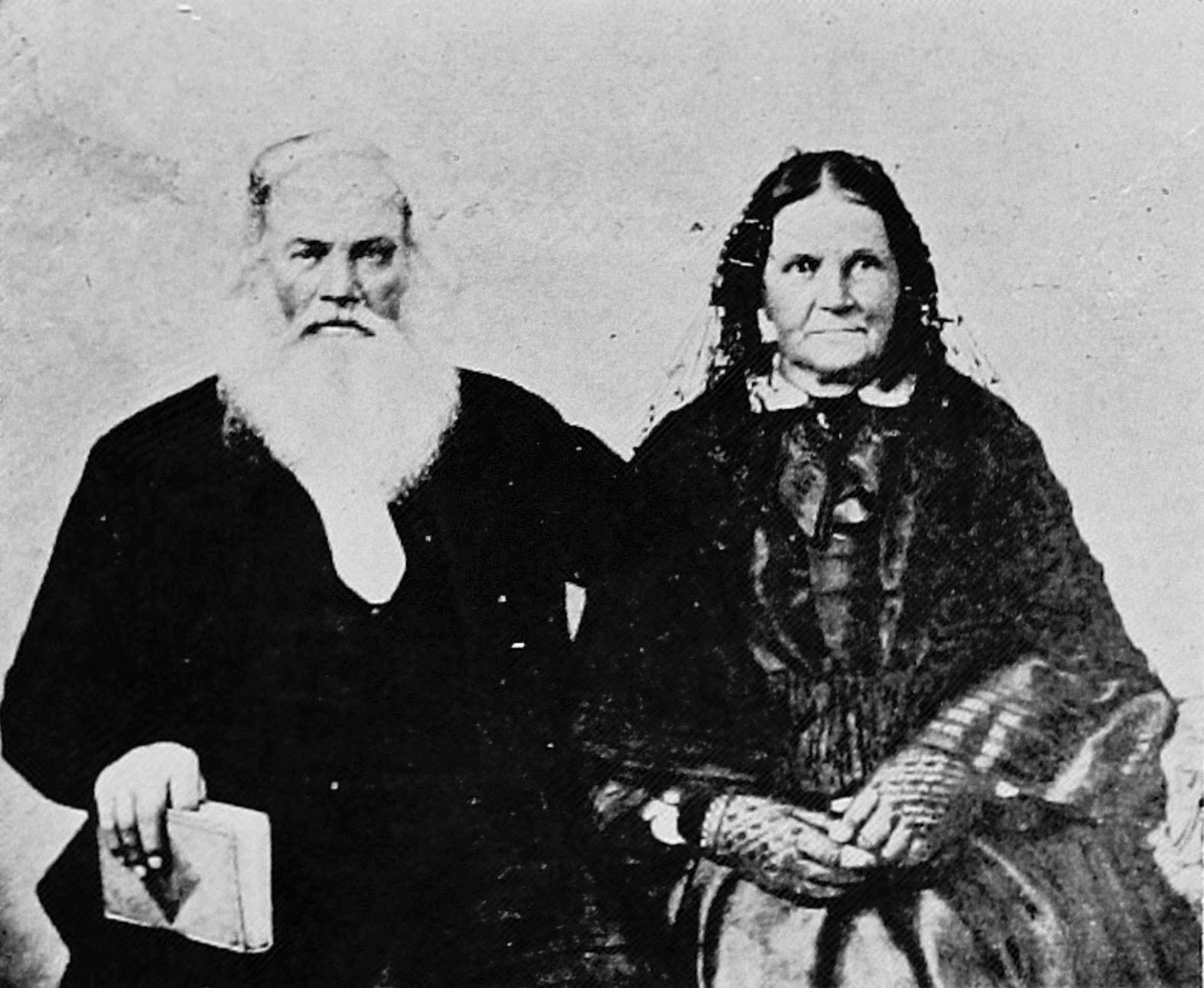
- Asa and Lucy Goodale Thurston, from a daguerreotype, circa 1864
- Born: October 12, 1787; Fitchburg, Massachusetts
- Died: October 13, 1868 (aged 81); Honolulu, Hawaii
- Occupation: Missionary
- Spouse: Lucy Goodale Thurston
- Children: Persis Goodale, Lucy Goodale, Asa Goodale, Mary Howe, Thomas Gairdner

Asa Thurston (October 12, 1787 – March 11, 1868) was a Protestant missionary from the United States who was part of the first company of American Christian missionaries to the Hawaiian Islands with his wife Lucy Goodale Thurston.

== Asa Thurston ==
Born in Fitchburg, Massachusetts, on October 12, 1787, Asa Thurston worked as a scythe maker until he was 22 years old. His parents were Lydia (Davis) and Thomas Thurston. He attended Yale College, where he was a member of the Linonian Society and graduated in 1816, and completed Andover Theological Seminary in 1819.

He married Lucy Goodale, and together they went as missionaries by the Congregationalist Church to the Sandwich Islands in 1820. Thurston worked as a Protestant missionary in Hawaii for forty years, returning to New England only for the period 1840 to 1842. He also traveled to California in 1863. They saw religion and education as closely linked.

In Hawaii Thurston built churches and schools, and had a following among the people. He was one of the first to translate the Bible into the Hawaiian language. Together with the English missionary William Ellis, he explored the islands and viewed the volcano Kilauea.

After suffering a series of strokes, he began speaking in a mixture of English, Hawaiian, and Latin. He was moved to Honolulu, where he died on March 11, 1868.

== Legacy and honors ==
- The Thurston lava tube in Hawaii Volcanoes National Park is named for his family.

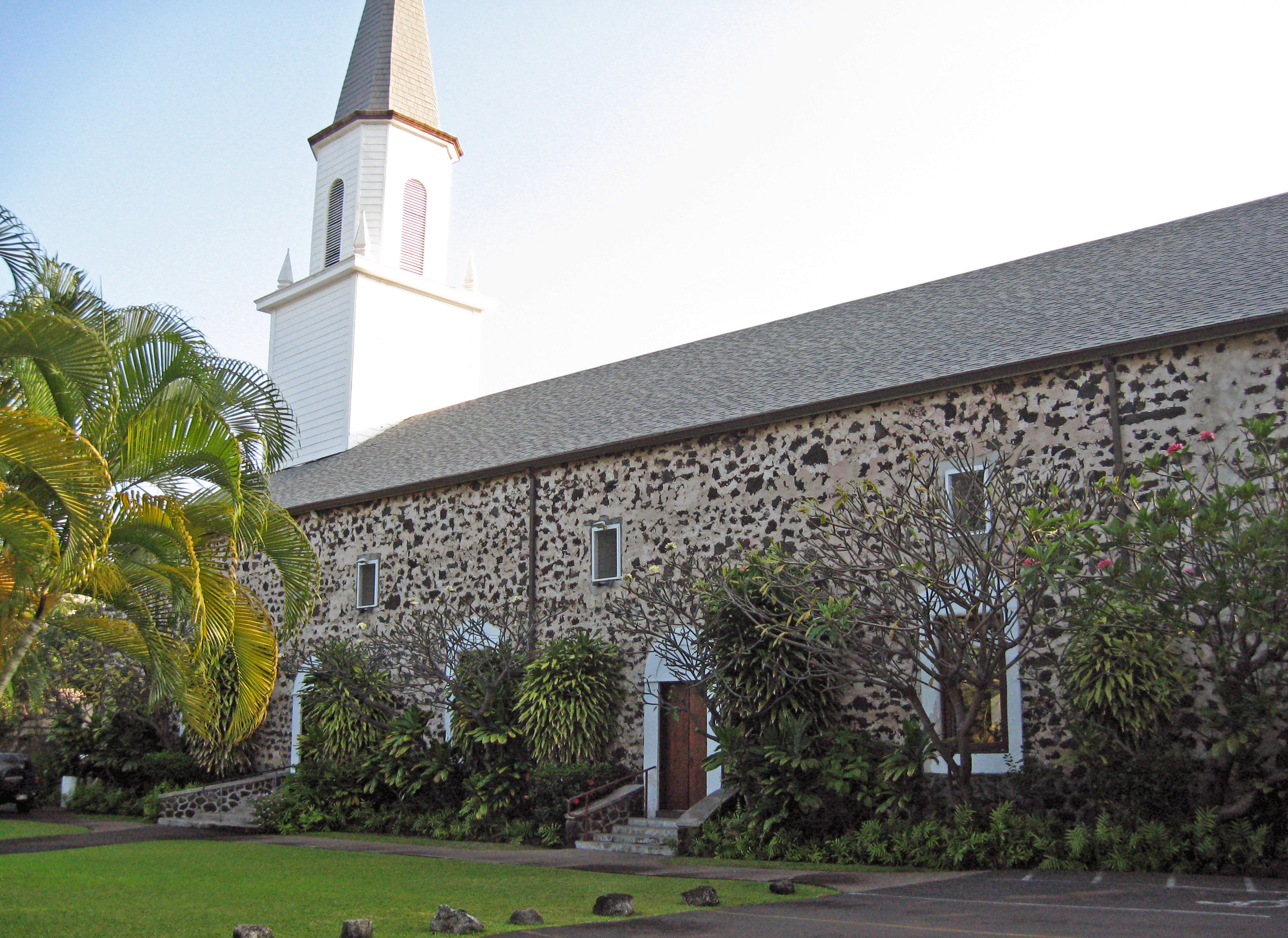
Mokuʻaikaua Church today

== Work ==
A native Hawaiian named Opukahaia, orphaned by the islands' wars, traveled to New England in 1809 (there is a monument to him in Punaluʻu) and learned to speak English. In 1818 his stories (along with a few other companions) about the islands convinced the American Board of Commissioners for Foreign Missions to send a company to Hawaii. Thurston and Hiram Bingham I, with whom he was ordained, were selected as leaders of the group which included a farmer, physician, three teachers, and a few native Hawaiian assistants. On October 12, 1819, he married Lucy Goodale, a cousin of a classmate. They set sail a few weeks later on October 23, 1819, from Boston for a five-month voyage on the small merchant ship Thaddeus.

After landing at Kawaihae harbor on March 30, 1820, the Thurstons went first to Kailua-Kona, arriving there on April 12, 1820. where they consulted with the British sailor John Young who was an advisor King Kamehameha I. They found the Hawaiian Religion in turmoil, due to the death of Kamehameha I, and the ending of the Kapu system by Queen Kaʻahumanu and King Kamehameha II.

They then traveled to Maui, then to Oʻahu, and finally back to Kailua-Kona in 1823. With the blessing of Royal Governor John Adams Kuakini, he set up his congregation in a series of thatched huts. From about 1835 to 1837, he supervised the construction of the Congregationalist Mokuʻaikaua Church, made from stone, which still stands today. The Thurstons with five children began a family prominent in the history of the islands up to the present: Persis Goodale born September 28, 1821, Lucy Goodale born April 25, 1823, Asa Goodale born August 1, 1827, Mary Howe born June 3, 1831, and Thomas Gairdner born May 9, 1836.

== Hawaiian bible ==
Together with the group of the missionaries, that consisted of Hiram Bingham and others, Asa Thurston translated in 1832-1839 the Christian Bible into Hawaiian, Ka Baibala Hemolele. His translation was 25 percent of the New and Old Testaments, which was the second largest contribution among the group.

== Family ==
Their first daughter Persis Goodale Thurston Taylor (1821–1906), born in Hawaii, became a painter and sketch artist and married Reverend Townsend Elijah Taylor. Their second daughter Lucy Goodale Thurston (1823–1841) came to New England to obtain a higher education but died from pneumonia soon after their arrival to New York. Their third child, Asa Goodale Tyerman Thurston (1827–1859) married Sarah Andrews. Their fourth child, Mary Howe Thurston (1831–1876), married Edwin A. Hayden and Marcus Benfield. Their fifth child, Thomas Gairdner Thurston graduated from Yale in 1862, studied theology, and returned to Hawaii, where he preached until the time of his death in 1884. Thomas Gairdner Thurston married Harriet Frances Richardson and Alice Gasking. Their son Asa Goodale Thurston married Sarah Andrews, daughter of the missionary Lorrin Andrews of Maui. One of their children was Lorrin A. Thurston (1857–1931), who was a leader of the 1893 overthrow of the Kingdom of Hawaii. A great-great grandson is Thurston Twigg-Smith.

Thurston Hawaii family tree

Asa Thurston (1787–1868)	Lucy Goodale (1795–1876)	Lorrin Andrews (1795–1868)	Mary Wilson
William Cornelius Shipman (1824–1861)	Persis Goodale Thurston Taylor (1821–1906)	Asa Goodale Thurston (1827–1859)	Sarah Andrews (1832–1899)
William Herbert Shipman (1854–1943)	Margaret Clarissa; Shipman	Lorrin A. Thurston (1858–1931)	Harriet Elvira Potter
William Twigg-Smith (1883-1950)	Margaret Carter Thurston (1895–1976)	Lorrin Potter Thurston (1899-1984)
Thurston Twigg-Smith (1921-2016)

== See also ==
- Bible translations into Hawaiian
