= Persis Goodale Thurston Taylor =

American painter

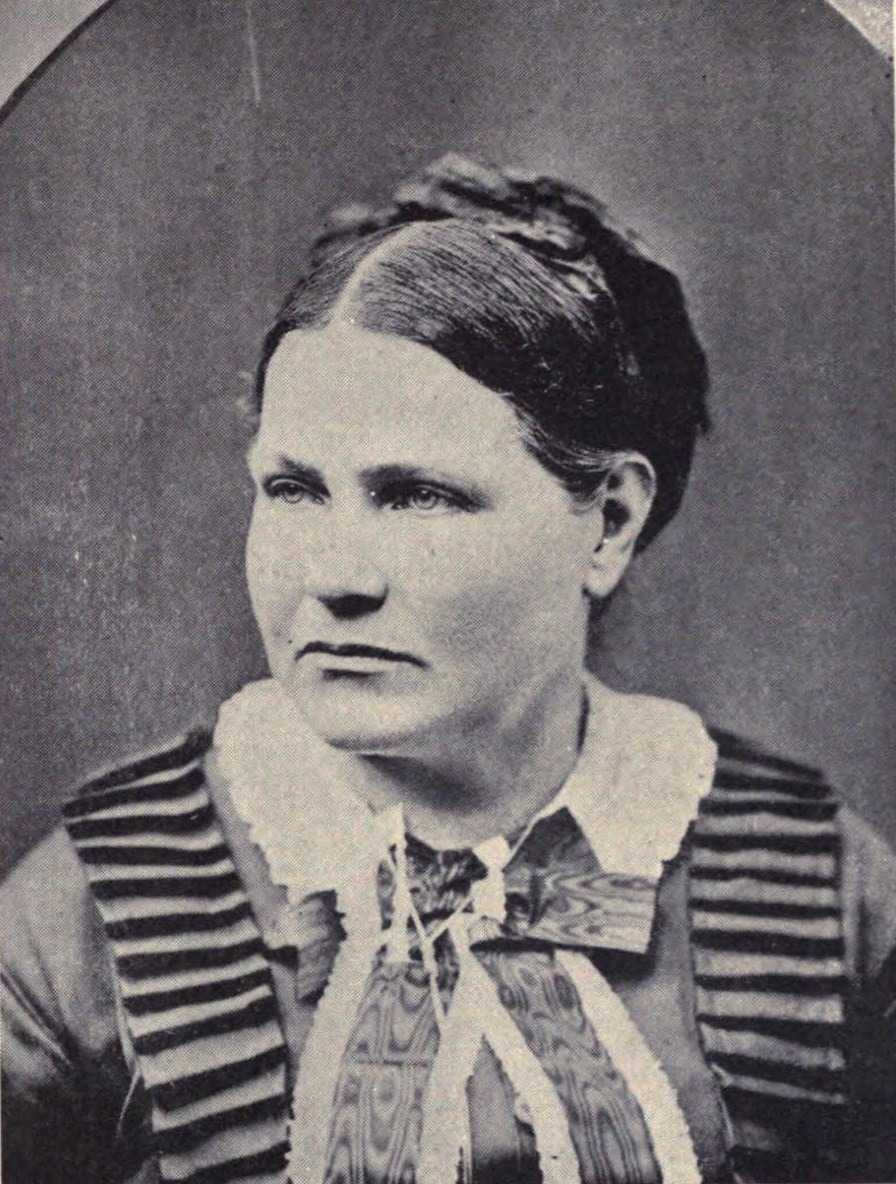
- Persis Goodale Thurston Taylor (c.1859)
- Born: Persis Goodale Thurston; September 28, 1821; Kailua-Kona, Hawaii
- Died: April 20, 1906 (aged 84); Honolulu, Hawaii
- Known for: Painting
- Spouse: Townsend Elijah Taylor (m. 1847)

Persis Goodale Thurston Taylor (September 28, 1821 – April 20, 1906) was a painter and sketch artist.

== Biography ==
Her parents, Reverend Asa Thurston (1787–1868) and Lucy Goodale Thurston (1795–1876), were in the first company of American Christian missionaries to the Hawaiian Islands. When she was four, she had been asked to be given in hānai to Princess Kapulikoliko, daughter of Kamehameha I. Her mother politely refused. The concept of giving a child to be raised by a relative or friend was common in Hawaii, but it horrified the missionaries who preached one doesn't give out their children like puppies.

For three years, she lived in Lahaina, Maui, where she assisted in the work of the seminary press at Lahainaluna School. In 1847, she married Rev. Townsend Elijah Taylor of LaGrange, New York, who was serving as the seaman's chaplain for the Port of Lahaina.

Taylor is best known for her landscapes (two of which were made into engravings at the Lahinaluna seminary) and silhouettes of both missionaries and Hawaiian royalty.

== Family tree ==
Thurston Hawaii family tree

Asa Thurston (1787–1868) | Lucy Goodale (1795–1876) | Lorrin Andrews (1795–1868) | Mary Wilson
William Cornelius Shipman (1824–1861) | Persis Goodale Thurston Taylor (1821–1906) | Asa Goodale Thurston (1827–1859) | Sarah Andrews (1832–1899)
William Herbert Shipman (1854–1943) | Margaret Clarissa; Shipman | Lorrin A. Thurston (1858–1931) | Harriet Elvira Potter
William Twigg-Smith (1883-1950) | Margaret Carter Thurston (1895–1976) | Lorrin Potter Thurston (1899-1984)
Thurston Twigg-Smith (1921-2016)

Notes:

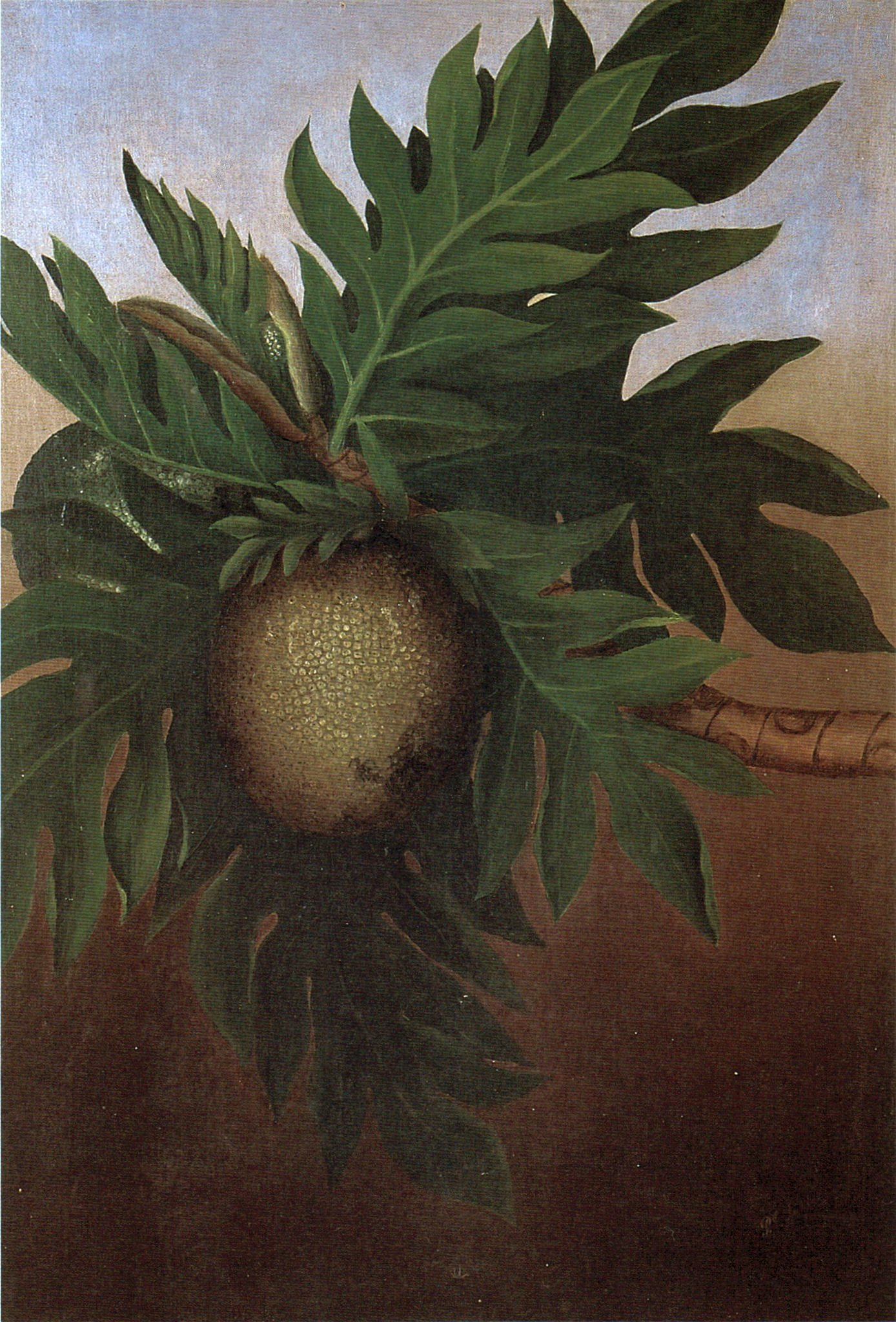
Hawaiian Breadfruit, oil on canvas painting c. 1890
