= Honokohau =

Honokōhau in Hawaiian means "the bay where waters congregate".

Honokohau may also refer to these place-names in Hawaiʻi:

- Honokohau Harbor, a marina in western Hawaiʻi Island
- Kaloko-Honokōhau National Historical Park in western Hawaiʻi Island
- Honokohau Valley, a valley and the bay that follows, in western Maui
