= Robert Andrews =

Robert Andrews may refer to:

- Rob Andrews (baseball) (born 1952), Major League Baseball second baseman
- Rob Andrews (born 1957), New Jersey politician
- Robert Andrews (translator) (1723–1766), English Dissenter, minister, poet and translator of Virgil
- Robert Andrews (landowner) (1725–1806), subject of a painting by Thomas Gainsborough
- Robert Andrews (clergyman) (1748–1804), American clergyman, professor and Virginia politician
- Robert Andrews (civil servant) (c. 1763–1821), British government official, Resident and Superintendent of British Ceylon (1796–1798)
- Robert Andrews (architect) (1857–1928), American architect
- Robert Andrews (actor) (1895–1976), British actor
- Robert Hardy Andrews (1903–1976), American novelist, screenwriter and radio drama script–writer
- Robert Wilson Andrews (1837–1922), Hawaii-born artist and engineer
- Robby Andrews (born 1991), American athlete

== See also ==
- Bob Andrews (disambiguation)
- Robert Andrew (disambiguation)
