= Goodale Homestead =

Historic house in Massachusetts, United States

- U.S. National Register of Historic Places
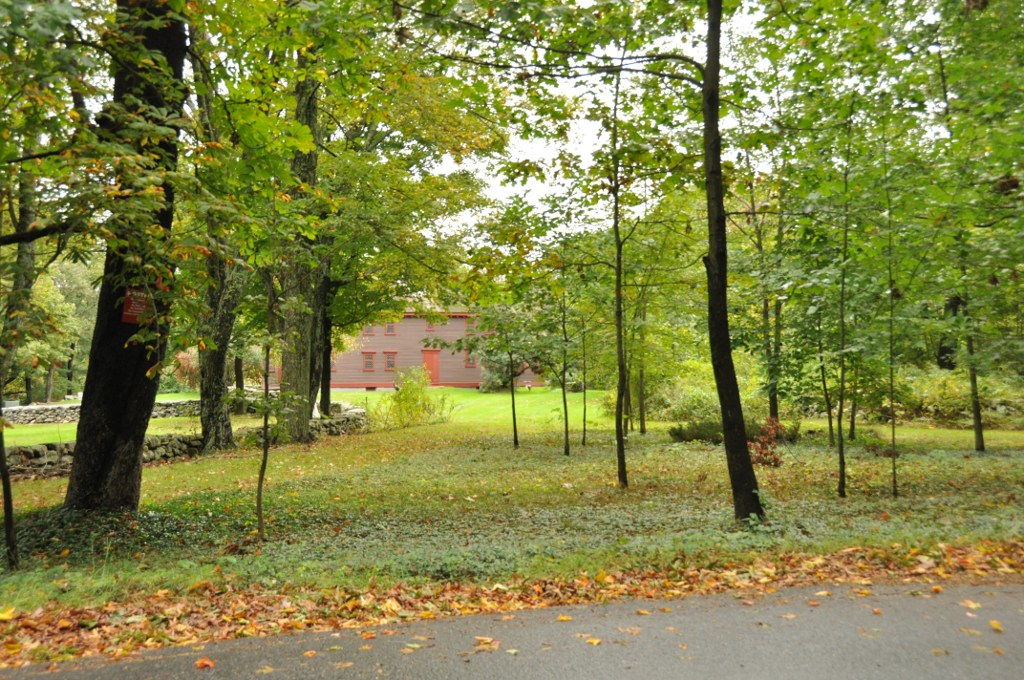

- Location within Massachusetts Location within the United States
- Location: 368 Chestnut Street; Hudson, Massachusetts
- Coordinates: 42°22′46″N 71°30′14″W
- Built: 1702
- Architect: George Francis Dow
- NRHP reference No.: 75000260
- Added to NRHP: January 21, 1975

The Goodale Homestead is a historic First Period house located at 368 Chestnut Street in Hudson, Massachusetts, United States. The oldest portion of the 2 1/2-story timber-frame house dates to 1702, making it the oldest existing building in Hudson. George Francis Dow and John Goodale designed and built the house. It was later home to Goodale's various notable descendants. The house may have been a stop on the Underground Railroad. It is listed on the National Register of Historic Places.

== History ==
George Francis Dow and owner John Goodale designed and built the original 1702 portion of the Goodale Homestead in what was then Marlborough, Massachusetts. When Goodale died in 1752, the house passed to his only son Nathan Goodale. At least five generations of notable Goodales were born or lived at the homestead, including Nathan's only son Abner Goodale, a captain in the American Revolutionary War who fought at the Battle of White Plains and later a deacon.

Abner and his wife Mary "Molly" Howe Goodale had at least ten children. Their first son Nathan Goodale became a schoolteacher while his younger brother David Goodale followed in their father's footsteps as a deacon. Their youngest sister Lucy Goodale Thurston became one of the first American Protestant missionaries in Hawaii.

Both Nathan and David Goodale had large families. Though Nathan was the oldest son he decided David should be the house's owner and occupant, supposedly stating, "Thou art the one to remain. Our father was a deacon, you are also a deacon, and let remain as the Deacon Goodale farm."

David Goodale was an anti-slavery abolitionist who ran for Congress on the Free Soil Party ticket. The house therefore possibly served as a stop on the Underground Railroad prior to the American Civil War. David's son David Brainard Goodale also became a deacon, making him the fifth generation of Goodales and third generation of deacons who were born or lived at the ancestral homestead.

In 1955 then owner Mrs. Arthur Greenwood donated the house's northern ell to the Smithsonian Institution. When the Marlborough, Hudson, and Massachusetts Historical Commissions inventoried the house as a historic property in 1974, Mrs. Greenwood's estate owned it.

The house was listed on the National Register of Historic Places on January 21, 1975. Since 1975 the house has been owned by corporations established by Thurston Twigg-Smith, Hawaiian businessman and a great-great-grandson of Lucy Goodale Thurston.

== Architecture ==
The original 2 1/2-story, wood frame-central portion of the Goodale house dates to 1702. This main part of the house is sheathed with wood clapboards and includes an original stone chimney. The house's western ell and a brick chimney are later additions, though still predating the American Revolution. The extant lead glass windows and dentiled cornice are 1920s-era reproductions. A northern ell was removed in 1955. The property includes two existing barns.

Historically, orchards and woodlots owned by the Goodale family surrounded the house. A small portion of this formerly agricultural landscape is preserved as the Goodale Memorial Forest, a publicly-accessible conservation area owned by the New England Forestry Foundation (NEFF). Goodale descendant Francis Goodale of Stroudsburg, Pennsylvania, donated the forest to the NEFF in 1967.

== See also ==
- Lucy Goodale Thurston
- National Register of Historic Places listings in Middlesex County, Massachusetts
