= Thurston Twigg-Smith =

American businessman

Thurston Twigg-Smith (August 17, 1921 – July 16, 2016) was an American businessman and philanthropist from Hawaii.

== Biography ==
Twigg-Smith was a fifth-generation descendant of missionary settlers in Hawaii. He was born in 1921 in Honolulu, Hawaii, the son of William and Margaret Carter Twigg-Smith (née Thurston) (1895–1976). He was the great-great-grandson of two missionary couples: Asa and Lucy Goodale Thurston and Lorrin Andrews and his wife Mary Ann Wilson. He was the grandson of an American lawyer, politician, and businessman born and raised in the Kingdom of Hawaiʻi, Lorrin A. Thurston, who played a key role in the 1893 overthrow of the Hawaiian Kingdom. His father William was an artist and a musician, who supported his family as an illustrator at the Hawaiian Sugar Planters' Association.

Twigg-Smith grew up in the lower Nuʻuanu Valley on Bates Street, in a house his father built. At the time, L.A. Thurston was publisher of the Honolulu Advertiser.

Twigg-Smith, his brother David, and sister Barbara attended Lincoln and Kapalama elementary schools. Twigg-Smith went on to President Theodore Roosevelt High School for junior high and entered Punahou School in the 10th grade on a scholarship.

He graduated from Punahou School in 1938 and earned a mechanical engineering degree from Yale University in 1942. Twigg-Smith served in the armed forces during World War II in Europe in five campaigns. He attained the rank of captain in the field artillery and was awarded the Bronze Star.

Returning to Hawaii in December 1945, he started work at the Honolulu Advertiser in February 1946. As a major, he started the 483rd Field Artillery battalion in the Hawaii National Guard. He left the guard in 1954 as a lieutenant colonel to concentrate on his duties as managing editor of the newspaper.

In 1961 Twigg-Smith took control of the financially ailing paper with the help of outside investors. It became financially profitable. In 1993 it was bought by a regional subsidiary of the Gannett Company for $250 million.

Twigg-Smith founded the Persis Corporation in 1967, originally named "Asa Corporation (Hawaii)" after his ancestor. Persis Corporation philanthropy includes Honolulu Museum of Art Spalding House (formerly The Contemporary Museum, Honolulu), Friends of Opal Creek, Goodale Farm, Hawaii Theatre Center, Historic Hawaii Foundation, the Laniakea Foundation, the Lyman House Memorial Museum, Punahou School, and Yale University. Thurston Twigg-Smith was a major supporter of non-profit service organizations and of the arts, and in 1997 he was named Hawaii's Philanthropist of the Year. The Yale University website notes:

"Thurston Twigg-Smith has long been an enthusiastic patron of both artists and art museums," says Susan Vogel, the Henry J. Heinz II Director of the gallery. "Since 1991, when he joined the Yale Art Gallery's governing board, he has given us 38 important contemporary works, among them such masterpieces as Diebenkorn's 'Ocean Park No. 24' and Wayne Thiebaud's 'Drink Syrups.' And 80 more are promised. It gives us great pleasure to share with our visitors the spirited and often witty works of art that have charmed this collector's 'Hawaiian Eye.'"

Twigg-Smith and Laila Twigg-Smith purchased Twin Farms, the 300-acre estate in Barnard, Vermont, which was previously the home of Nobel Laureate Sinclair Lewis and journalist Dorothy Thompson. They used it as a vacation home until turning it into a resort in 1993.

Twigg-Smith died on July 16, 2016.

== Legacy and honors ==
- A building was named for him in the Case Middle School at Punahou School.

== Opposition to Hawaiian sovereignty ==
In the 1990s, Twigg-Smith began taking an active role in opposing the Hawaiian sovereignty movement, writing a book, Hawaiian Sovereignty: Do the Facts Matter? in 1994 that defended his grandfather's actions. He funded several programs and lawsuits that advocate against a sovereign Hawaiian nation and Hawaiian-based policies in Hawaii.

== Family life ==
In 1942 he married Bessie Blossom Bell (1921-2010) and divorced in 1984. They had five children.

He married Laila Roster (née Bergs) (1944-1998), an art collector, in 1984; they divorced in 1994.

In 1996 he married Sharon Carter Smith.

Thurston Hawaii family tree

Asa Thurston (1787–1868) | Lucy Goodale (1795–1876) | Lorrin Andrews (1795–1868) | Mary Wilson
William Cornelius Shipman (1824–1861) | Persis Goodale Thurston Taylor (1821–1906) | Asa Goodale Thurston (1827–1859) | Sarah Andrews (1832–1899)
William Herbert Shipman (1854–1943) | Margaret Clarissa; Shipman | Lorrin A. Thurston (1858–1931) | Harriet Elvira Potter
William Twigg-Smith (1883-1950) | Margaret Carter Thurston (1895–1976) | Lorrin Potter Thurston (1899-1984)
Thurston Twigg-Smith (1921-2016)
