= Bob Andrews =

Bob Andrews may refer to:

- Bob Andrews (guitarist) (born 1959), English musician with Generation X
- Bob Andrews (keyboardist) (1949–2025), English keyboardist with Brinsley Schwarz
- Bob Andrews (footballer) (1941–2005), Australian rules footballer
- Bob Andrews (rugby league) (1919–1979), Australian rugby league footballer of the 1940s
- Bob Andrews (character), a character from the Three Investigators juvenile detective book series
- Bob Andrews (speedway rider) (1935–2026), British/New Zealander speedway rider

== See also ==
- Robert Andrews (disambiguation)
