= Kawaihae, Hawaii =

Unincorporated community in Hawaii, United States

Coordinates: 20°2′7″N 155°49′42″W

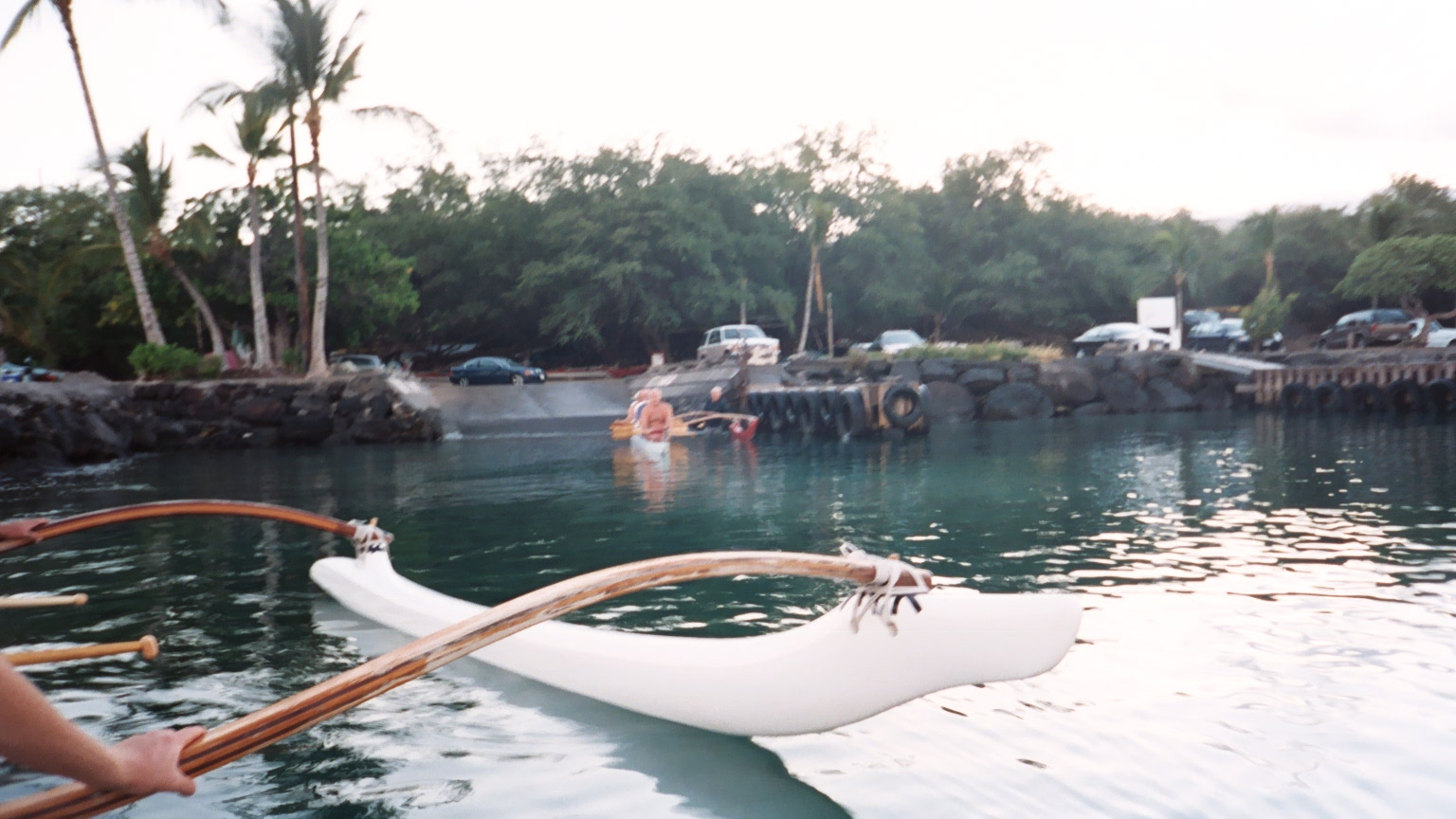
Loading outrigger canoes at the Kawaihae Canoe Club

Kawaihae is an unincorporated community on the west side of the island of Hawaiʻi in the U.S. state of Hawaiʻi, 35 miles (56 km) north of Kailua-Kona. Its harbor is one of only three on the island, together with that of Hilo and Honokohau Harbor.

== Description ==
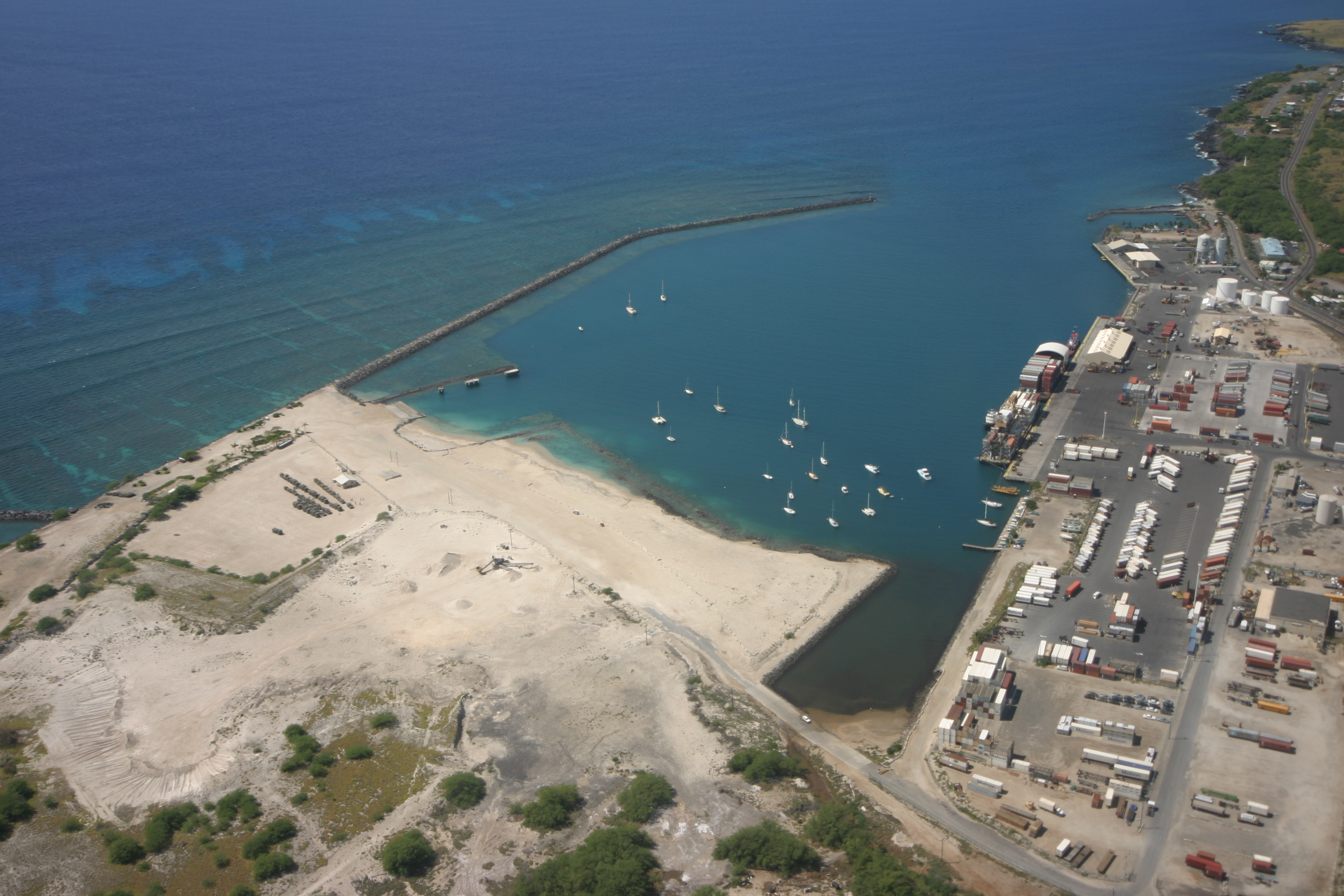
Aerial view of Kawaihae Harbor

The town's harbor includes a fuel depot, shipping terminal and military landing site. Outside of the man-made breakwall of the harbor is a popular surf spot and the Pua Kailima o Kawaihae Cultural Surf Park. The small town features a handful of restaurants and art galleries. To the north of the harbor is the Kawaihae Canoe Club and a small boat ramp. To the south is Puʻukoholā Heiau national historic site, built by King Kamehameha I in 1791. Also to the south is the smaller Mailekini Heiau and the Hale o Kapuni Heiau (shark heiau), which is submerged.

== History ==
Kawaihae served as the seat of kingdom of Hawaii island during the reign of the usurper king Alapaʻinuiakauaua, whose family, the Mahi's, hailed from the Kohala district; he was the king that sought to kill the infant Kamehameha at his birth. His successor Kalaniʻōpuʻu, who overthrew Alapaʻi's son Keaweʻopala, moved the capital back to the Kona district where his family originated. In the late 1700s, Kawaihae's naturally sheltered bay was considered one of the more suitable commercial harbor for western ships on the Big Island. Its harbor and proximity to the fertile uplands of Waimea ensured its status as an important stopover for many early European voyagers and merchantmen needing to make repairs and resupply their ships during the early period of the Kingdom of Hawaii. Kawaihae or "Too-yah-yah" was first sighted by James King, serving under Captain Cook, on February 6, 1779, after departing from Cook's initial visit to Kealakekua Bay. Failure to find anchorage prompted them to return to Kealakekua Bay, where Cook met his demise. King returned a few months later after Cook's death, but was not impressed with the area he deemed "little cultivated" or the people, whom he called "of the lowest class that inhabited [the islands]".

=== Residence of King Kamehameha I ===
It became the principal residence of King Kamehameha I from 1790 to 1794 where he built the Puʻukoholā Heiau and sacrificed Keōua Kuahuʻula, his last opponent on the Big Island, and where he plotted out his conquest of the remaining islands in the archipelago. He lived in the royal compound of "Pelekane" on the shoreline northwest of Mailekini Heiau, which he named after the Hawaiianized name for Britain. Kamehameha's British advisor John Young also resided in the vicinity of Kawaihae with his family, and the ruins of their homestead, the remains of what is believed to be the first western-style house in Hawaii, could still be seen today near the Puʻukoholā Heiau. Another British explorer, George Vancouver, the first to successfully anchor off Kawaihae Bay on February 14, 1793, paid a visit to King Kamehameha and John Young and gave the king cattle, introducing the species for the first time to Hawaii. After the development of Parker Ranch by John Palmer Parker, Kawaihae served as the main center for loading and shipping cattle and beef in Hawaii.

It was in Kawaihae, on April 1, 1820, that the first company of American missionaries to Hawaii led by Asa and Lucy Goodale Thurston, who later founded Mokuaikaua Church in Kailua Kona, arrived aboard the Thaddeus and set foot on the islands. Kawaihae thrived for the duration of the sandalwood trade, which depleted its forest, and the whaling age. Whalers and merchant ships annually visited its harbor, where they would stock up on agricultural products and beef from the region. But by the late 1800s, Kawaihae had declined in importance due to the end of whaling, the decimation of its population by foreign diseases and migration of its people to other parts of Hawaii; it became a sleepy, forgotten village serving mainly as a cattle landing. In the 1830s, it became a major hub for islanders to procure the best seafood from its fishermen. Salt pans were also constructed here to extract salt that could be used in production of preserved fish as well as trading with neighboring Kohala. The pans were heavily damaged in a tidal wave in 1946.

=== Construction of harbor ===
The United States Army Corps of Engineers dredged the harbor and built the breakwall between 1957 and 1959 and brought the village back from obscurity; though in the process had destroyed what remained of the salt pans. In 1970, construction of a small boat harbor began to the south of the main harbor entrance by several institutions under the name of Project Tugboat. It was designed as a test of the use of high explosives to create harbors in hard substrate and as a proof of the concept that small nuclear charges could be used for civil works projects. Over 100 tons of conventional explosives (roughly equivalent to the smallest nuclear charge that could be built at that time) were buried in the Kawaihae reef and detonated to clear the basin and the entrance.

The harbor served as the launching point for the film Waterworld with Kevin Costner. The artificial reef or floating island was just off the coast with headquarters for the movie at the harbor.
