= Lorrin A. Thurston =

Hawaiian politician (1858–1931)

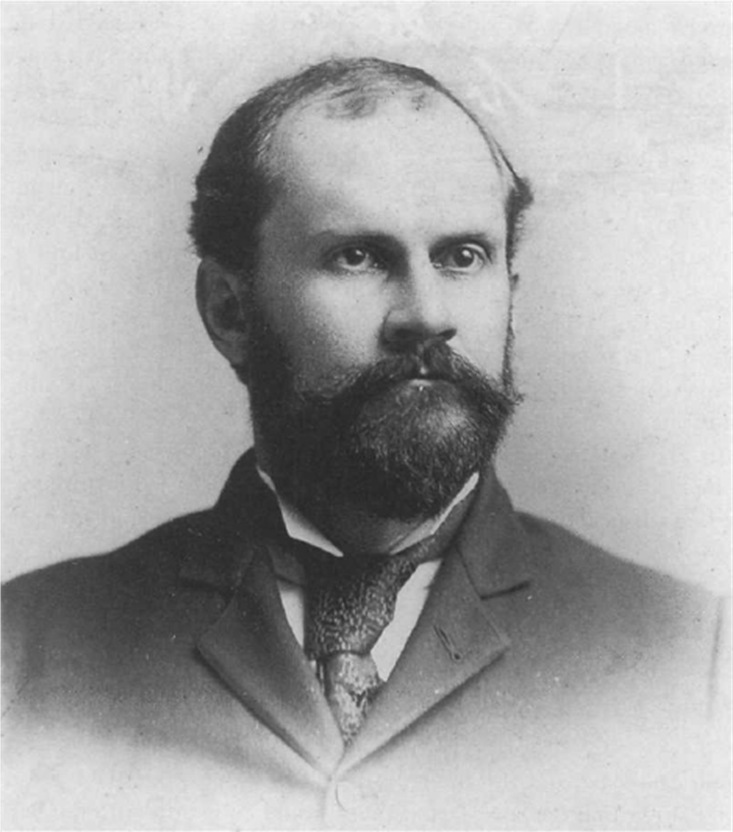
- Born: Lorrin Andrews Thurston; July 31, 1858; Honolulu, Kingdom of Hawaii
- Died: May 11, 1931 (aged 72); Honolulu, Territory of Hawaii
- Occupations: Lawyer, politician, businessman
- Spouses: Margaret Clarissa Shipman (m. 1884; died 1891) Harriet Elvira Potter (m. 1893)
- Children: 3

Lorrin Andrews Thurston (July 31, 1858 – May 11, 1931) was a Hawaiian citizen lawyer, politician, and businessman. Thurston played a prominent role in the overthrow of the Kingdom of Hawaii to replace Queen Liliʻuokalani with the Republic of Hawaii, with discreet US support for which Congress much later apologized. He published the Pacific Commercial Advertiser (a forerunner of the present-day Honolulu Star-Advertiser), and owned other enterprises. From 1906 to 1916, he and his network lobbied with national politicians to create a national park to preserve the Hawaiian volcanoes.

== Family life ==
He was born on July 31, 1858, in Honolulu, Hawaii. His father was Asa Goodale Thurston and mother Sarah Andrews. On his father's side he was grandson of Asa and Lucy Goodale Thurston, who were in the first company of American Christian missionaries to the Hawaiian Islands in 1820. On his mother's side, he was also the grandson of another early missionary, Lorrin Andrews. His father was speaker of the house of representatives of the Kingdom of Hawaii but died when Lorrin was only a year and a half old in December 1859. He then moved to Maui with his mother.

He was fluent in the Hawaiian language and gave himself the Hawaiian nickname Kakina. In 1872, he attended Oahu College, where he played baseball with the sons of Alexander Cartwright (who invented the modern game). He was expelled shortly before graduation. After working as a translator for a law firm and clerk at the Wailuku Sugar Company, he attended law school at Columbia University. He returned to Honolulu in 1881 and became partners in a law firm with William Owen Smith.

He married Margaret Clarissa "Clara" Shipman (daughter of missionary William Cornelius Shipman from Hilo, Hawaii, and sister of businessman William Herbert Shipman) on February 26, 1884. They had a son Robert Shipman Thurston on February 1, 1888. Margaret died in childbirth on May 5, 1891 (as did the infant). On April 5, 1893, Lorrin Thurston married Harriet Elvira Potter of Saint Joseph, Michigan. They had a daughter Margaret Carter (the mother of Thurston Twigg-Smith) in 1895, and a son Lorrin Potter Thurston in 1899. Lorrin Andrews Thurston died on May 11, 1931. In 1919, Robert Thurston married Evelyn M. Scott, and Margaret Carter married William Twigg-Smith.

== Work ==
Lorrin Thurston was influential in both the political arena and the business world of Hawaii.

=== Politics ===
He followed his father and became a member of the legislature of the Hawaiian Kingdom in 1886. Thurston inherited the conservative thinking of the missionaries, which put him at odds with Hawaiian royalty as well as immigrants such as Greek hotelier George Lycurgus whose lifestyles were filled with gambling and liquor. The Missionary Party would change its name to the Reform Party in 1887, as it grew to include business owners. In July 1887 Thurston authored what is called the "Bayonet Constitution" because it was imposed under threat by the Honolulu Rifle Company militia. It limited the executive power of the monarch King Kalākaua. Thurston became the powerful Interior Minister, with Englishman William Lowthian Green as minister of finance, as the old cabinet of Walter M. Gibson was ousted. Voting rights and membership of the legislature were based on property ownership, resulting in effective control by wealthy Americans and Europeans. He served in the cabinet until June 17, 1890, when he was replaced by Charles N. Spencer.

Queen Liliʻuokalani became monarch in 1891 and tried to seize more power with a new constitution. In 1892 Thurston led the Annexation Club, later adopting the title Committee of Safety, which planned for making Hawaii a territory of the United States. In 1893 the Committee of Safety was supported by the U.S. Military in an overthrow of the Hawaiian Kingdom, and the resulting Provisional Government of Hawaii was controlled by Thurston's committee. Thurston headed the commission sent to Washington, D.C., to negotiate with Benjamin Harrison for American annexation. Liliʻuokalani and Crown Princess Victoria Kaʻiulani also traveled to Washington to claim the new government did not have the support of the majority of the Hawaiian population. As news spread of the force used, the proposed treaty met opposition and was not ratified. A century later in the Apology Resolution of 1993, the U.S. Congress controversially apologized for the involvement of the United States Marine Corps in the overthrow, and the controversy continues to modern times.

In March 1893 Grover Cleveland became president, and disavowed the treaty. Thurston helped draft another constitution, and the Republic of Hawaiʻi was declared on July 4, 1894. He appointed Sanford B. Dole to the office of President of the Republic. A series of abortive revolts called the Wilcox rebellions had little public support, and were defeated during this period. In 1897 William McKinley became president and Thurston's commission again lobbied for annexation. The Spanish–American War in April 1898 increased American interest in the Pacific, due to battles in the Philippines. By July 1898 the annexation formed the Territory of Hawaii and Thurston retired from political office to run his business affairs.

=== Business ===
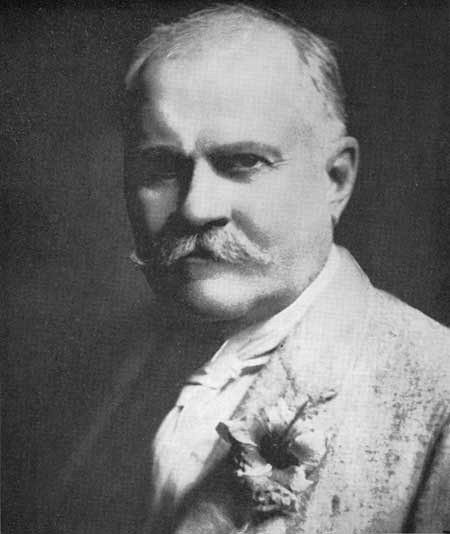
Thurston c. 1916

In 1898 he purchased the Pacific Commercial Advertiser newspaper (forerunner of the present-day Honolulu Advertiser). As principal owner and publisher after 1900, he promoted the sugar and pineapple industries. He headed the Hawaiian Promotion Committee (which evolved into the Hawaii Visitors & Convention Bureau), but objected to the hula which he claimed was "suggestive" and "indecent". His fortunes rose considerably as a result of the 1898 annexation by the United States, since it removed all duties from shipments to the largest market. Thurston is credited with expanding Hawaiʻi's sugarcane plantations and railroads and bringing the first electric street cars to Honolulu. Following World War I he called for government restrictions on Japanese-language schools, later ruled unconstitutional by the U.S. Supreme Court. Thurston put out a special edition to support the fight to ban billboards in Hawaiʻi. He worked with Wallace Rider Farrington and Alexander Hume Ford to hold a world conference of newspaper editors.

He was also a volcano enthusiast, starting in his childhood exploring Haleakalā on Maui. He would act as an informal tour guide for visitors to the summit, and used oral history to estimate the time of its last eruption. In 1891, he bought and expanded the Volcano House hotel at the rim of the active Kīlauea volcano on the island of Hawaiʻi. Thurston commissioned a cyclorama of Kīlauea which he displayed in his travels to the mainland, including the Chicago World's Columbian Exposition of 1893 and the California Midwinter International Exposition of 1894 in San Francisco.

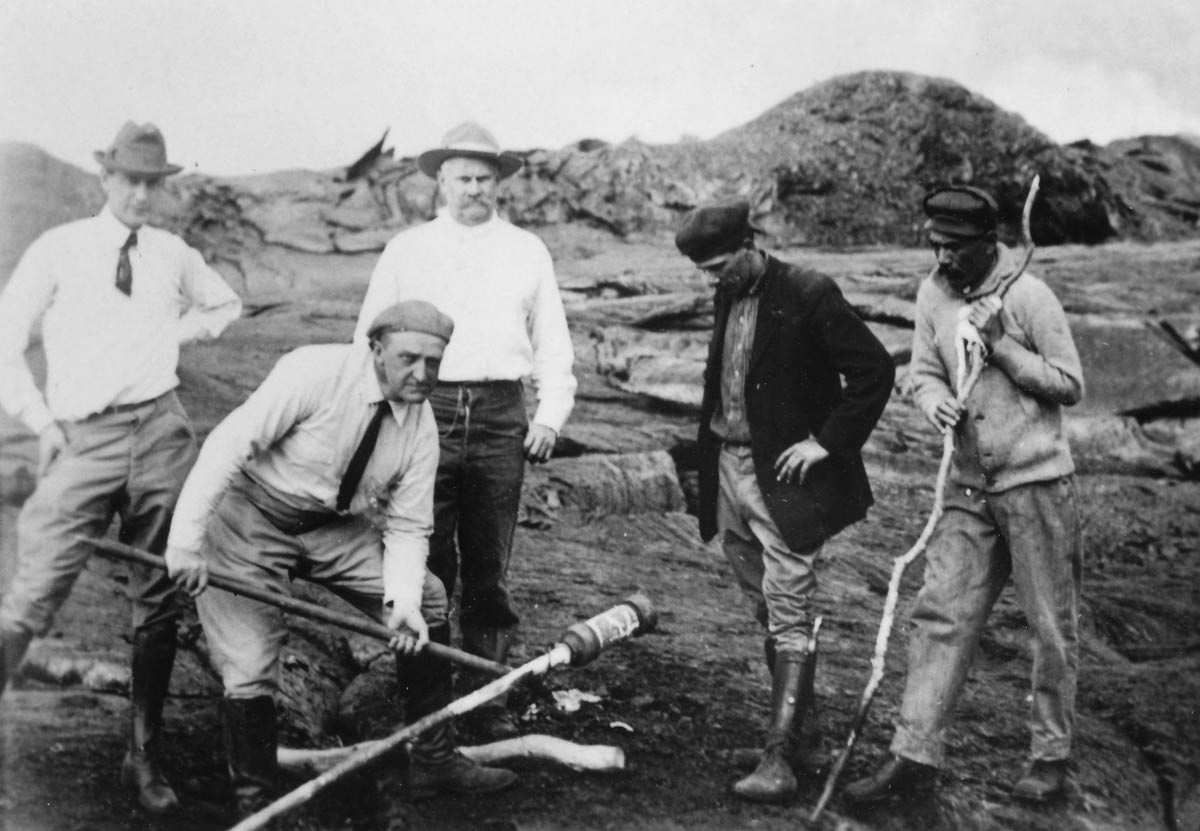
Thurston (center) at the volcano in 1917

Thurston eventually made peace with George Lycurgus, who had been an insurgent against Thurston's government, and sold him the Volcano House in 1902. He also became friends with early volcanologist Dr. Thomas Jaggar in 1909 and raised money to fund the Hawaiian Volcano Observatory in 1912. He used his newspaper to promote the national park idea and convinced the territorial legislature to fund a group of congressmen to visit Haleakalā and Kīlauea in 1907. The trip included a dinner cooked over active lava vents. He hosted a visit by the Secretary of the Interior James Rudolph Garfield in 1908, and another congressional visit in 1909. He convinced Governor Walter F. Frear to introduce a resolution supporting the idea, and formed a survey team to propose exact boundaries. His newspaper printed endorsements of the park by President Theodore Roosevelt (a classmate at Columbia), conservationist John Muir, and powerful senator Henry Cabot Lodge. In 1913 he explored a lava tube in Hawaiʻi Volcanoes National Park that is named after him. The park was finally formed in 1916.

He added a preface and published a second edition of his grandmother's book on early missionary life in May 1921. His memoirs were published in a limited edition (along with those of Sanford Dole) after his death in 1931 by his newspaper.

The newspaper business was run by his son Lorrin Potter Thurston, whose policy of using the term "Jap" during World War II pleased the military, but not local readers of Japanese descent. After the war readership declined, until its hostile take-over in 1962 by Lorrin's grandson Thurston Twigg-Smith who changed to a more moderate editorial line. In 1992 it was sold to Gannett Company as the next generation of the family had no interest in running the paper. Twigg-Smith wrote a book about the revolution and the role of his grandfather in 1998, and criticizing the modern Hawaiian Sovereignty movement. In 1966, a chapel at Punahou School designed by Vladimir Ossipoff was named after Robert Shipman Thurston, Jr. of the class of 1941 who disappeared in World War II.

== Legacy ==
Thurston's legacy is preserved throughout the islands. On Oahu, the Thurston name serves as a marker in many places, including a street named after Thurston in the Punchbowl neighborhood and the Thurston Memorial Chapel on the Punahou Campus. Others include Thurston Lava Tube at the Hawaii Volcanoes National Park on the Big Island.

In the 2009 film Princess Kaiulani, Thurston was portrayed by Barry Pepper.

=== Family tree ===
Thurston Hawaii family tree

Asa Thurston (1787–1868)	Lucy Goodale (1795–1876)	Lorrin Andrews (1795–1868)	Mary Wilson
William Cornelius Shipman (1824–1861)	Persis Goodale Thurston Taylor (1821–1906)	Asa Goodale Thurston (1827–1859)	Sarah Andrews (1832–1899)
William Herbert Shipman (1854–1943)	Margaret Clarissa; Shipman	Lorrin A. Thurston (1858–1931)	Harriet Elvira Potter
William Twigg-Smith (1883-1950)	Margaret Carter Thurston (1895–1976)	Lorrin Potter Thurston (1899-1984)
Thurston Twigg-Smith (1921-2016)

Notes:

Government offices
Preceded by Luther Aholo	Kingdom of Hawaii Minister of Interior; July 1887 – June 1890	Succeeded by Charles N. Spencer
