= W. H. Shipman House =

Historic Place in Hawaii County, Hawaii

- U.S. National Register of Historic Places
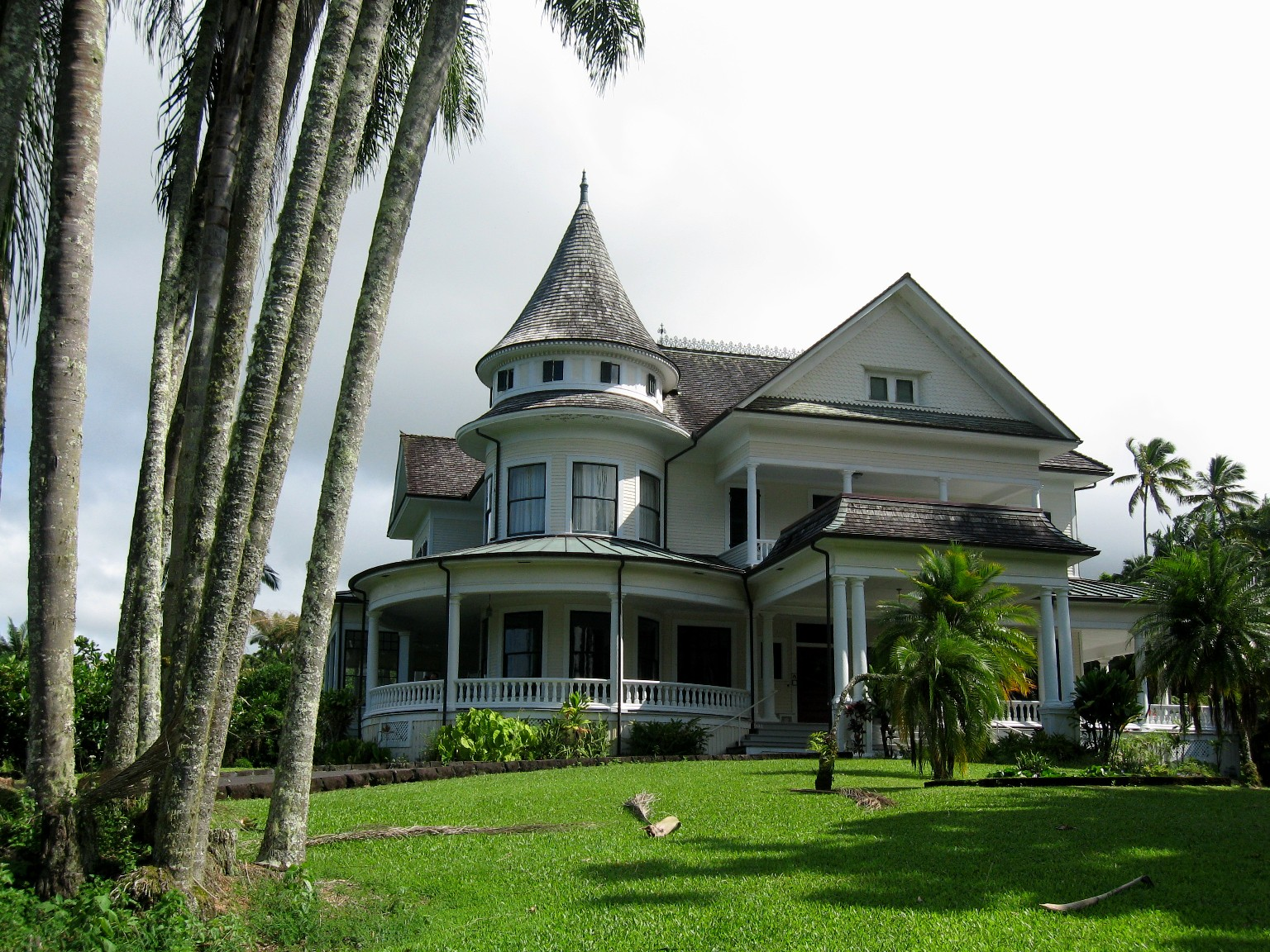
- This Hilo house was formerly a hotel

- Location within Hawaii
- Location: 131 Kaʻiulani Street, Hilo, Hawaii
- Coordinates: 19°43′27″N 155°5′58″W
- Area: 4.9 acres (2.0 ha)
- Built: 1899
- Architect: Henry Livingston Kerr for J. R. Wilson
- Architectural style: Late Victorian
- NRHP reference No.: 78001013
- Added to NRHP: June 23, 1978

W. H. Shipman House is a historic home used by William Herbert Shipman. It is located at 131 Kaʻiulani Street, named for Princess Kaʻiulani, the last crown princess of the Kingdom and Liliʻuokalani's niece.

In 1856 King Kamehameha IV leased an area known as Kolo iki to William Reed for cattle pasture. In 1861 Reed purchased the 26 acres (11 ha) and it came to be known as "Reed's Island". It is not really an island, but the area between a current and ancient channel of the Wailuku River. J. R. "Jack" Wilson owned Volcano Stables, a horse rental business at the current site of the historic Volcano Block Building in Hilo. In 1899 after an iron bridge was completed, Wilson bought a 8-acre (3.2 ha) lot with a view on Reed's island and built a large house in the Victorian architecture style. It was designed by Honolulu architect Henry Livingston Kerr, and constructed with indoor plumbing and electricity. In addition to the main house placed prominently on a hill the estate includes a guest house, servants' quarters, gardens, and a garage. An unusual feature is the two-story round tower with conical roof, circular veranda, and large curved panes of glass.

In February 1901 William Shipman bought the house to entertain guests in the growing city of Hilo. Deposed Queen Liliʻuokalani would play her compositions at the grand piano when she was visiting. Author Jack London and his wife stayed at this house for five weeks in August and September 1907, while his boat The Snark was being repaired. London's book The Cruise of the Snark (1911) is based on this journey. In the early 1930s, Cecil B. DeMille filmed Four Frightened People in the gulch below the house, as well as on the Shipman land in Puna. In 1939 artist Georgia O'Keeffe stayed and was shown various sites that appeared in her paintings.

The Hilo house was listed on the state register of historic places on December 5, 1973, as site 10-35-7405, and the National Register of Historic Places listings on the island of Hawaii on June 23, 1978, as site 78001013. Barbara-Ann Andersen (daughter of Roy Shipman Blackshear, a great-granddaughter of W. H. Shipman) restored the house and operated it for roughly 20 years starting in 1997 as a bed and breakfast hotel.
