= Robert Wilson Andrews =

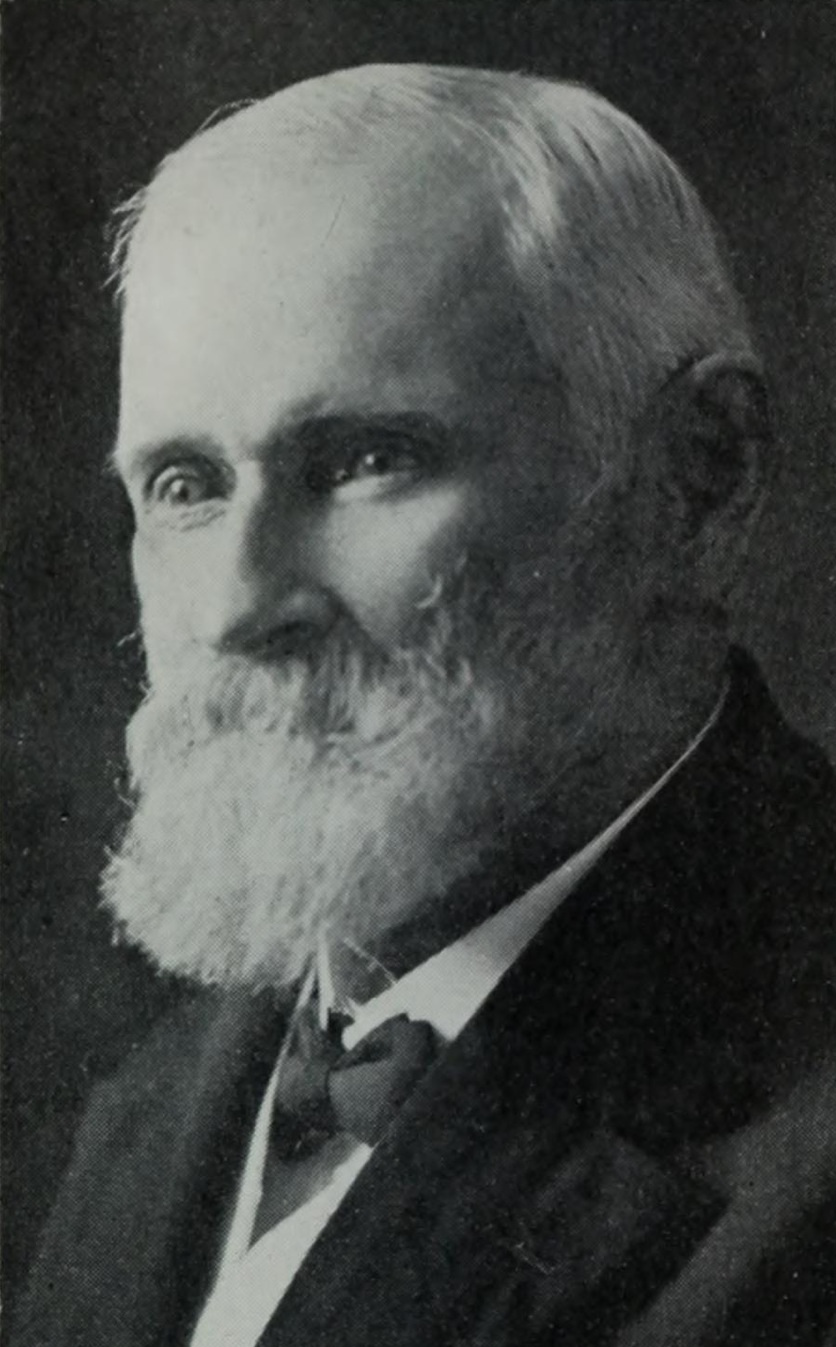
Robert Wilson Andrews

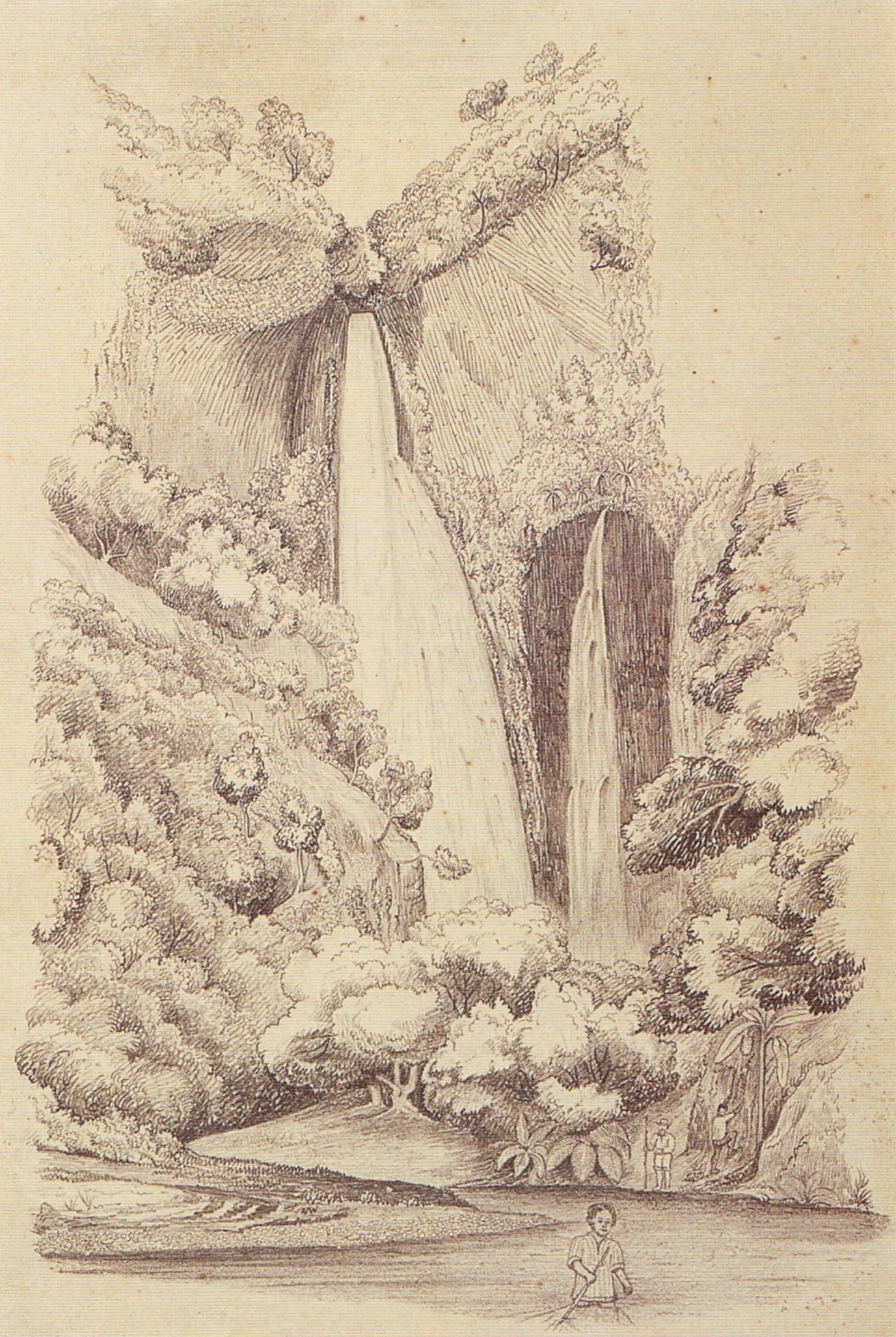
Hanapēpē Falls, Kauai, graphite drawing on paper by Robert Wilson Andrews, 1857

Robert Wilson Andrews (June 8, 1837 – 1922) was a Hawaii-born artist and engineer. His father Lorrin Andrews (1795–1868) was an early American missionary to Hawaii and a judge. Prior to leaving Hawaii in 1859, Robert made a number of finely crafter landscape drawings including renderings of the sacrificial stone at Kolekole Pass, ʻĪao Needle, Kapuʻuohoʻokamoa-Hāmākualoa Falls and Hanapēpē Falls. He studied engineering on the mainland at Miami University in Oxford, Ohio, and returned to Hawaii in 1863, where he worked as a sugar mill engineer for 30 years. He remained involved with the church, and spent his retirement years teaching Sunday school.
