= Bob Andrews (footballer) =

Australian rules footballer

Personal information
- Full name: Bob Andrews
- Born: 30 December 1941
- Died: 9 July 2005 (aged 63)
- Original team: Nar Nar Goon
- Height: 170 cm (5 ft 7 in)
- Weight: 73 kg (161 lb)

Playing career^{1}
| Years | Club | Games (Goals) |
| 1962–63 | North Melbourne | 10 (15) |
- ^{1} Playing statistics correct to the end of 1963.

Bob Andrews (30 December 1941 – 9 July 2005) was an Australian rules footballer who played with North Melbourne in the Victorian Football League (VFL).
