= Honokōhau Harbor =

Marina in Kailua-Kona, Hawaiʻi, U.S.

Coordinates: 19.669°N 156.024°W

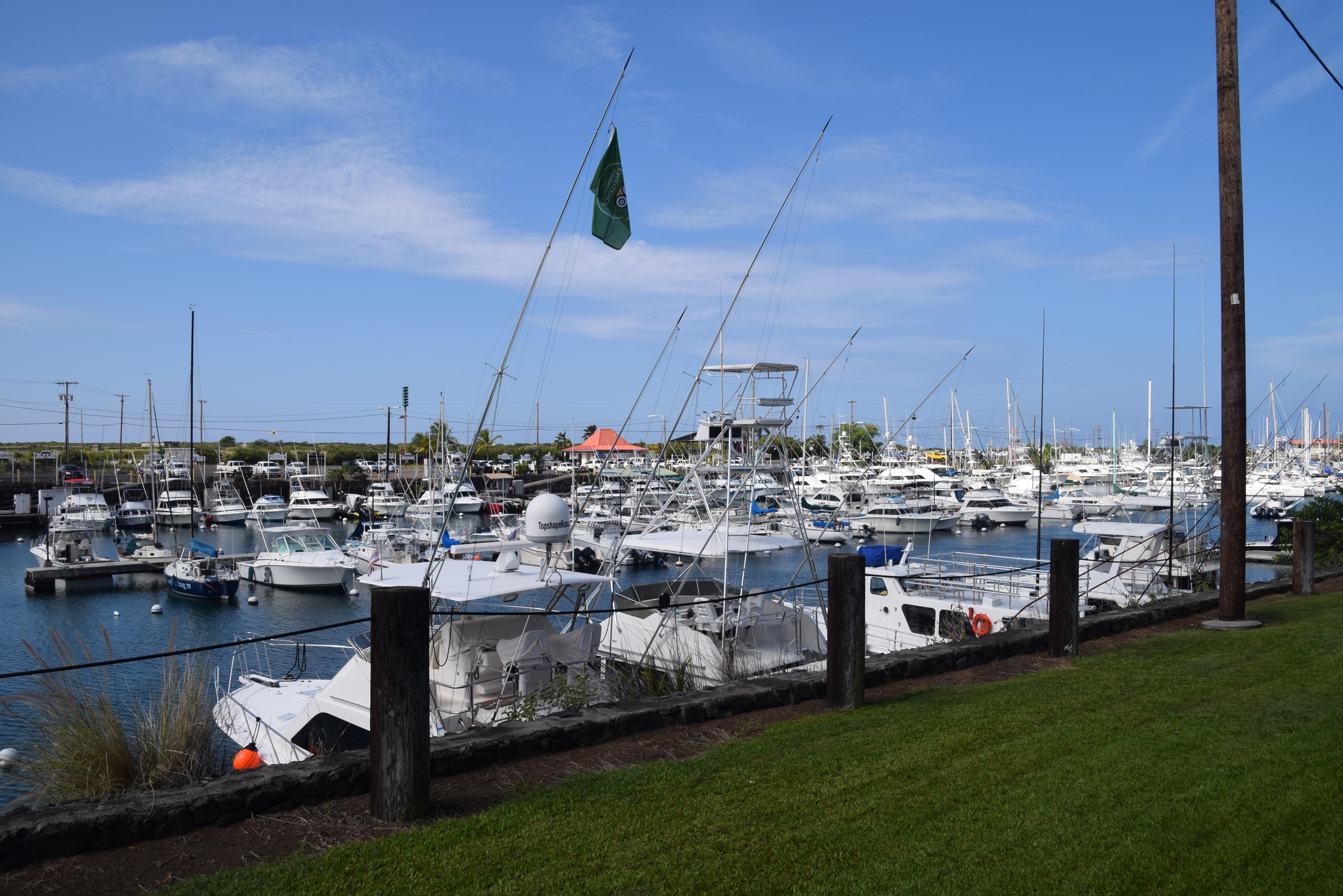
A view of the marina from "Harbor House" restaurant

Honokōhau Harbor, officially named Honokōhau Small Boat Harbor, is a marina in Kailua Kona, Hawaii, United States It was built during the 1960s on the lava seashore of western Hawaii Island.

== Construction of the harbor ==
As western Hawaii lacks a reasonable port, the plan of Honokōhau Harbor was approved in 1965. Its actual construction was done between 1968 and 1970 by the U.S. Army Corps of Engineers, with the use of explosives in large amount against the lava rocks. The management of this harbor was transferred from Hawaii Department of Transportation to Division of Boating & Ocean Recreation, Department of Land & Natural Resources in 1990, although the U.S. Army Corps of Engineers still maintains breakwater and other aspects of the ocean entrance to the harbor.

== Facilities ==
Besides the marina which contains 262 boat slips, there are 3 boat ramps, a repair shop, a large parking lot, a restaurant "Harbor House", and a few boutiques. Dry dock and other dockside services are done by Gentry's Kona Marina in association with other companies.

== Sightseeing ==
Various boat tours to snorkel, scuba, manta rays, watch whales, and do fishing in the ocean depart from this harbor.

== Transportation ==
Honokōhau Harbor is located at the end of Kealakehe Parkway, at the traffic light on Hawaii State Highway 19, five miles south of Kona International Airport.

== Environmental ==
The harbor is located adjacent to Kaloko-Honokōhau National Historical Park. An environmental assessment for the expansion of the harbor was submitted in 2012.

== Incidents ==
During 2023 and 2024, multiple people have driven their vehicles into the water at a boat ramp located in Honokōhau Harbor.

== See also ==
- Hilo Harbor (in east Hawaii)
- Kawaihae Harbor (in northwest Hawaii)
