= Clara Andrew =

British adoption pioneer (1862–1939)

- Born: 1862
- Died: 6 July 1939 (aged 76–77); Campden Hill
- Occupations: Activist; adoption pioneer
- Known for: Founder of the National Children Adoption Association
- Honours: Queen Elisabeth Medal

Clara Andrew (1862 – 6 July 1939) was a British adoption pioneer, activist, and founder of the National Children Adoption Association. She was recognised for her work with Belgian refugees during World War I and later dedicated her efforts to fight against the practice of baby farming in the United Kingdom.

== Early life ==
Andrew spent her early life in Exeter. Her father was Thomas Andrew, a former Mayor of Exeter, and she was the second girl of nine children. Her early education was at The Maynard School, Exeter. She later studied in Germany and was at the Wesleyan College in Trull in 1881.

== Career ==
=== Exeter ===
In 1912, Andrew was appointed as one of the first members of the Exeter National Insurance Committee where she was involved in the care of children with tuberculosis. She also was a founding member and Vice President of the Devon and Exeter Women's Equitable Benefit Society, which in part administered the National Insurance Act 1911.

=== World War I ===
Andrew continued her interest in public work during World War I. She was a founding member of the Belgian Refugee Committee which later became known as the Devon County War Refugees' Committee. She received the Queen Elisabeth Medal from the King of Belgians in recognition of her services to Belgian refugees.

By 1916, Andrew turned her efforts to organising work in Woolwich Government munition factories, taking on the rank of Lady Superintendent. It was here that she gained more experience of helping homeless children and finding homes for orphans. She found that there were casualties among the women munitions makers and babies were left motherless. It was reported that on one occasion, Andrew visited a hospital to check on one of her charges and a hospital matron gave her a baby to hold. After the nurse informed her that the baby would likely die from poor care, Andrew had the idea to offer women the chance to adopt the baby. The combination of housing Belgian refugees and organising the adoption of munition workers' orphans inspired the foundation of the National Children Adoption Association.

=== National Children Adoption Association ===
"Children in overcrowded institutions cannot possibly have the same chance of development as those who find loving adopters, thus our work is really of national importance, for unfortunate babies, happily placed and growing up under favourable circumstances, are far more likely to provide real assets to the State."

— Clara Andrew, Hetherwick, Ruby (12 July 1919). "A babies' palace. Scheme to Deal with 'Unwanted' Children". The Sheffield Daily Independent. p. 8.

During her work with Belgian refugees, Andrew found that many British couples wanted to adopt Belgian children, so initiated scheme to secure the accommodation for Belgian refugees into Exeter and Devon households. She found that there was a constant stream of enquiries from childless couples who had always wanted children. Andrew reported that she received hundreds of letters saying "If you have got a Belgian baby with arms and legs I would like to adopt it."

The National Children Adoption Association (or 'the Association') was founded in Exeter in 1917 with Andrew appointed as honorary director. Princess Alice, Countess of Athlone was appointed president in 1919 and chairman of the executive committee, and the Association also received the patronage of The Queen Mother. There was interest from all parts of the United Kingdom, so centres were opened in other parts of the country including Salisbury, Isle of Wight, Plymouth, Liverpool and Bristol. In 1918 the Association's headquarters moved to London.

The Association's first hostel was Tower Cressy on Campden Hill which opened in 1918. The premises, which were originally intended to be a war memorial, were given to Andrew by The Women's Party after World War I and were jointly owned by Andrew and Princess Alice. By 1932, nearly 1,800 children had been cared for in Tower Cressy. A second hostel opened in Castlebar, Sydenham Hill which was opened by Mary of Teck in March 1933. Tower Cressy and Castlebar contained nursery training schools, the graduates of which became known as Princess Alice's Nurses.

From the years 1917-1932, it was reported that nearly 4,000 children were placed in private homes by the Association. Babies were accepted into homes of all classes and a few had gone to the Colonies.

"She treated them as her own children, played with them, taught them. She was always among them."

— Sunday Dispatch, ""Mother" of 6,000 fought the baby farmers". Sunday Dispatch. 9 July 1939. p. 11.

In 1928, Andrew travelled to South Africa on the invitation of Princess Alice to speak about the objectives of the Association and share her experience with interested child welfare bodies. After her visit, a model hostel was built in Johannesburg and opened by Princess Alice. Adoption committees worked with the South African Child Welfare Council in affiliation with the Association.

In 1932, Andrew completed a 13,000-mile tour of Canada with a goal to "foster a love for the destitute child and to create a chain of committees working on behalf of the unfortunate children of the British Empire." In 1937, she spoke to the Women's Section of the Exeter branch of the British Legion, and announced that the Association at that time had five hostels in England, more hostels in Vancouver and Johannesburg, and that nearly 300 babies were dealt with annually. At that time it was reported that adoption failures amounted to less than half a percent.

=== Political activism ===
Andrew spent years trying to fight the activities of "baby farmers" – individuals who adopted children, agreed to look after them for a price, but ignored their welfare. Andrew described baby-farming as "one of the greatest social evils of the day."

She was largely responsible for the passing of the Adoption of Children Act 1926. She believed that adoption was beneficial if done by experienced people and thought a Parliamentary Bill would provide assurance of this. With the passing of the Act, adoption became legal for the first time in England. As a precaution against "baby farming", it was ruled that no money would be passed to parents adopting children.

Andrew's representations to the Home Secretary resulted in the creation of a Departmental Committee on Adoption Societies and Agencies in 1935 and the passing of the Adoption of Children Regulations Bill in 1939.

== Death and legacy ==
"If you have done this work, you can't give it up until you die. Every one of these babies is like my own."

— Clara Andrew, "Adopting Babies Is The Aim Of Her Life". Reynold's News. 26 July 1936. p. 7.

Andrew died on 6 July 1939 following a stroke whilst working in the morning at Tower Cressy. Her funeral was held in Exeter Cathedral. By her death, over 6,000 children had been adopted due to her efforts.

Ethel Snowden, a fellow activist, wrote of Andrew after her death "she raised the question of child adoption of being one of private philanthropy to that of national status and importance. ... Her earnest though humour-loving and ceaseless activity sprang from the possession of a loving heart which bruised itself over the thought of what small, unwanted children had so often to suffer. Her pursuit of the 'baby-farmer' and her minute and sustained care of the thousands of children for whom she found happy homes and tender parents was so exacting that it was possible only because she was indeed the spiritual mother of all little children, whose cry for help she could not pass unheeded."

Gertrude Smith, a matron of the Association, said after Andrew's death "Miss Andrew was never very strong, but she was a very gallant woman. She went on working until 12 hours before her death. Her last thought was for the welfare of her babies." Mrs. J R Clynes, vice president of Association, wrote "I can express nothing but admiration for Miss Andrew's work for children. It was not simply a job, it was her mission in life, her whole reason for living."

The obituary in the Devon and Exeter Gazette described her as "unsparing in her work for the Association, and all who knew her fell under the spell of her enthusiasm and burning desire to be of service to the most helpless members of the community."

In her book Love child : a memoir of adoption, reunion, loss and love, Sue Elliott writes: "For someone who was obviously such a formidable self-publicist, very little information has survived about the life and work of Clara Andrew... In surviving newspaper reports and official records, she leaps from the page, a determined and opinionated woman who like nothing better than battling with bureaucracy on behalf of 'our suffering children'".
