= Robert Andrew =

Robert Andrew may refer to:

- Robert Andrew (died 1437), MP for Cricklade and Wiltshire
- Robert Andrew (field hockey) (born 1942), Australian field hockey player
- Robert Andrew (golfer) (born c. 1841), Scottish golfer
- Robert Andrew (MP for Ipswich), MP for Ipswich 1391 and 1393
- Robert Lynal Andrew (born 1944), politician in Saskatchewan, Canada
- Rob Andrew (born 1963), English rugby union player

== See also ==
- Robert Andrews (disambiguation)
