= William Andrew =

William Andrew may refer to:

- William Andrew (cricketer) (1869–1911), English first class cricketer
- William Andrew (priest) (1884–1963), Anglican priest
- William Andrew (publisher), technical publisher and imprint of Elsevier
- William E. Andrew, chancellor of the University of Prince Edward Island, Canada
- William G. Andrew (1886–1965), American attorney and politician
