= Lucy Goodale Thurston =

Christian missionary (1795–1876)

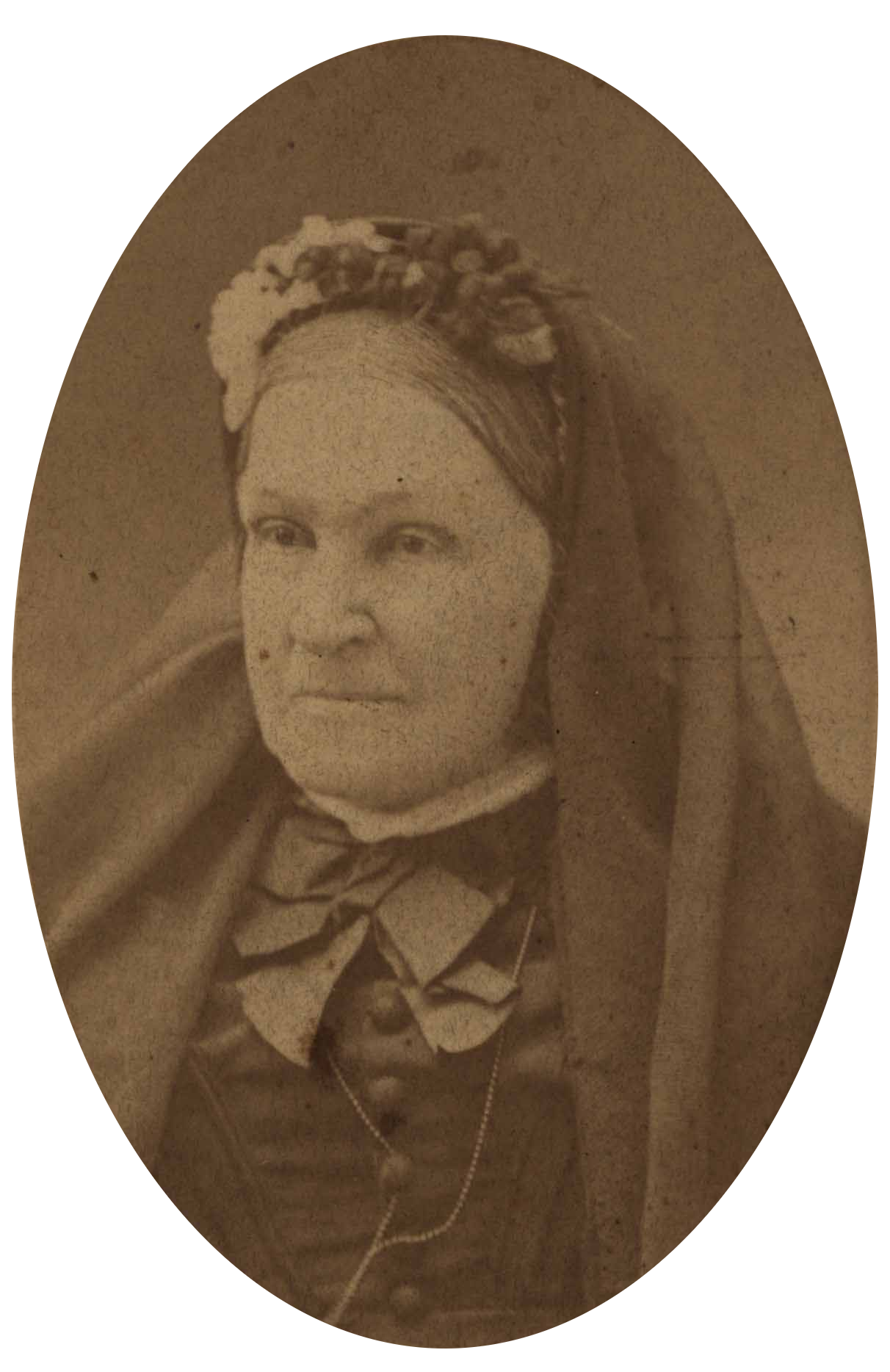
- Lucy Goodale Thurston, photograph by Bradley and Rulofson
- Born: October 29, 1795; Marlborough, Massachusetts
- Died: October 13, 1876 (aged 80); Honolulu, Hawaii
- Occupation: Missionary
- Spouse: Asa Thurston
- Children: 5, including Persis Goodale

Lucy Goodale Thurston (October 29, 1795 – October 13, 1876) was a Protestant missionary and author. She was the wife of Asa Thurston and was one of the first American Christian missionaries to Hawaii. She is noted for her letters documenting her life and missionary works in the islands.

== Background ==
Lucy Goodale was born to a prosperous family on October 29, 1795, on the Goodale Homestead in Marlborough, Massachusetts, in what would later become Hudson, Massachusetts. Her parents were Abner Goodale, a deacon and American Revolutionary War veteran, and Mary Howe. She graduated from Bradford Academy and became a school teacher.

In 1819, she applied to a newspaper advertisement seeking volunteers to missionize in Hawaii through the invitation of King Kamehameha II. To be accepted, however, the applicants were required to be married beforehand. On October 12, 1819, she married Thurston, a scythe maker and minister from Fitchburg. He was one of the theological graduates from Yale University who posted the mission announcement. Lucy and Asa were complete strangers prior to their wedding. Several days later, she accompanied her husband on a five-month voyage on board the ship Thaddeus. They reached Kawaihae, Hawaii, on March 30, 1820.

The couple helped build churches and schools after securing permission for their ministry at Kailua-Kona from King Kamehameha and Queen Ka'ahumanu. The Thurstons, unlike most missionary couples, spent most of the rest of their lives in the islands.

In 1855, Lucy was diagnosed with breast cancer. As treatment for her illness, Lucy had a mastectomy to remove her left breast in the same year. The procedure was conducted by Seth Porter Ford without anaesthetic, which had not been developed at that time. The operation was successful and she lived for another twenty years. She died on October 13, 1876, in Honolulu.

One of the Thurstons' grandchildren, Lorrin Andrews Thurston, would later play an important part in King Kalakua's decision to sign the Bayonet Constitution, which paved the way for the abolition of the Kingdom of Hawaii and for its annexation to the United States.

== Memoir ==
After her husband's death on March 11, 1868, Lucy started writing a memoir. She compiled her letters and other writings (completed by her daughter Persis Goodale Taylor and Walter Freer, and published under the title of Life and Times of Mrs. Lucy G. Thurston in Ann Arbor in 1876). It is one of the most vivid accounts of the early mission days.

The autobiography was divided into several parts. The first was devoted to the mission's early work in Hawaii. Later parts covered her journey to New York, the death of her daughter Lucy in 1841, and her experience battling cancer. The book also included accounts concerning Hawaiian chiefs.
