= William Twigg-Smith =

American painter

William Twigg-Smith's oil on canvas painting 'Hilo Sampans', 1917, 30 x 36 in.

William Twigg-Smith (né Smith; November 2, 1883 – April 21, 1950) was a New Zealand-born painter, illustrator and musician, who lived most of his life in Hawaii. During World War I, he was one of the first artists to serve in the American Camouflage Corps.

After the war, he worked full-time as an illustrator for the Hawaiian Sugar Planters Association. He also had solo shows, featuring his landscapes of the region. Several of his works are held by the Honolulu Museum of Art.

== Early life ==
Twigg-Smith was born, the third of four children, in Nelson, New Zealand to Frederick Charles Smith (1847 - 1905) and Alice Madeline Smith (née Thomas) (1858 - 1884). He left home for the U.S. to study art at age 16 at the Art Institute of Chicago under Harry M. Walcott.

In 1916, Twigg-Smith moved to Hawaii. He worked with Lionel Walden and D. Howard Hitchcock on creating the Pan-Pacific Carnival dioramas, which were exhibited in 1917. In September 1916, Twigg-Smith held his first art exhibit in Hawaii, in an exhibition at the Hilo Hotel in the Big Island (Hawaii) town of Hilo. In December he exhibited his work in Honolulu at a show sponsored by the University Club. In the Honolulu Star-Bulletin of June 2, 1917, the Hawaii Society of Artists, which Twigg-Smith helped found, announced their first show at the Pan-Pacific Building, which included Twigg-Smith and other HCA members works.

== World War I ==
When the U.S. entered World War I in 1917, Twigg-Smith enlisted in the U.S. Army. Due to his skills as an artist, he was sent for camouflage training at Camp American University in Washington, D.C. Afterward, he was assigned to duty in France as part of the American Camouflage Corps.

The others of the first four members of that unit were artists Sherry Edmundson Fry, Everett Herter (the brother of U.S. statesman Christian Herter) and Barry Faulkner. In his autobiography, Faulkner recalls that when Fry, Herter, and he first arrived at their tent, "we found a minstrel [Twigg-Smith], easing his solitude by playing Hawaiian airs on a ukulele. He came from the islands and was pleasant and companionable".

== Later life ==
After the war, Twigg-Smith returned permanently to Hawaii. On July 9, 1919 he married Margaret Carter Thurston (1895–1976), daughter of Lorrin A. Thurston. Thurston had led the overthrow of the Kingdom of Hawaii in 1893. Their son Thurston Twigg-Smith eventually took over the Honolulu Advertiser from Margaret's brother.

In 1923, Twigg-Smith was hired as a full-time illustrator for the Hawaiian Sugar Planters' Association. Four years later, he was given a solo exhibition at the Honolulu Museum of Art. In addition to being a painter and illustrator, he was a musician, serving as second flutist for the Honolulu Symphony.

Throughout his life in Hawaii, Twigg-Smith painted landscapes, seascapes, fishing activities, harbors, urban scenes, gardens, sugar cane fields and volcanoes. The Honolulu Museum of Art holds several of his works. He died in 1950 in Kona, Hawaii.

== Notes ==
Addition to footnote number 1 suggested: Dates and locations of these early shows taken from original articles from The Honolulu Advertiser and The Honolulu Star-Bulletin from 1916 and 1917 in the hands of Twigg-Smith's descendants.

== Sources ==
- Behrens, Roy R., "William Twigg-Smith". Camoupedia: A Compendium of Research on Art, Architecture and Camouflage, 2009, Dysart, Iowa: Bobolink Books. p. 356. ISBN 978-0-9713244-6-6.
- Forbes, David W., Encounters with Paradise: Views of Hawaii and its People, 1778-1941, 1992, Honolulu Academy of Arts, pp. 207–238
- Forbes, David W., He Makana, The Gertrude Mary Joan Damon Haig Collection of Hawaiian Art, Paintings and Prints, Hawaii State Foundation of Culture and the Arts, 2013, pp. 62–63
