= William Herbert Shipman =

Hawaiian businessman (1854–1943)

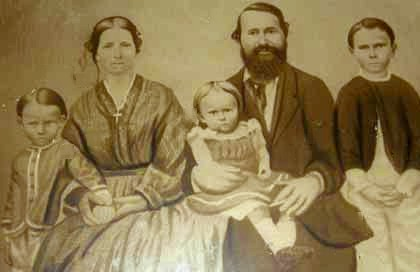
- Shipman family c. 1861; Left to right:Oliver Taylor, Jane Stobie, Margaret Clarissa, William Cornelius, and William Herbert
- Born: 1854; Lahaina, Hawaii
- Died: 1943 (aged 88–89)
- Occupation: Businessman
- Spouse: Mary (Mele) Elizabeth Kahiwaaialiʻi Johnson
- Children: Mary Mikahala, William Reed, Oliver B., Clara, Caroline, Florence Lukini, Margaret Beatrice, Herbert Cornelius
- Parent(s): William Cornelius Shipman; Jane Stobie

William Herbert Shipman (December 17, 1854 – July 8, 1943) was a businessman with an American background who was from the Kingdom of Hawaii. He grew up and conducted his business on the island of Hawaii. One estate of his family was used to preserve the nēnē, an endangered species of Hawaiian goose. A historic house associated with his family for over a hundred years is called the W. H. Shipman House in Hilo, Hawaii. Another of his historic estates called the Ainahou Ranch, built in 1941 as a refuge from World War II, is preserved within Hawaii Volcanoes National Park.

== Life ==
William Herbert Shipman (also known as "Willie" Shipman) was born December 17, 1854, at Lahaina, Hawaii, the son of missionary parents, William Cornelius Shipman (1824–1861) and Jane Stobie Shipman (1827–1904). William Herbert's parents were newly married in July 1853, when the American Board of Commissioners for Foreign Missions sent them to Micronesia. While on their way to their assignment, William Cornelius and Jane were told to disembark from their ship Chaica in Maui because Dwight Baldwin was acting as a physician on that island and Micronesia had no physician to handle the pregnant Jane Shipman's impending delivery.

In 1855, William Cornelius and Jane were assigned to the remote outpost of Waiʻōhinu in the Kaʻū district, replacing Rev. John D. Paris. From Wiaohinu, they were responsible for ministry in the entire Kaʻū District. Titus Coan, minister of Haili Church in Hilo, Hawai'i personally welcomed the Shipmans to their new post on their arrival.

On December 21, 1861, William Cornelius Shipman died from typhoid fever. Jane considered moving the family back to the United States at that point; however, as she was a trained teacher Titus Coan encouraged Jane to start a school on the Island of Hawai'i. In order to support her family, she moved with her three young children - William Herbert, Oliver Taylor, and Margaret Clarissa - to Hilo and opened a school for both Hawaiian and white children. On July 8, 1868, she married businessman William H. Reed (for whom Reed's Bay and Reed's Island in Hilo are named). Her eldest child, William Herbert (W. H.) Shipman attended Punahou School in Oahu and Knox College in Galesburg, Illinois.

In April 1879, W. H. Shipman married one of his mother's former students, Mary (Mele) Elizabeth Kahiwaaialiʻi Johnson, the grand-niece of Isaac Davis and the granddaughter of Kauwe, a member of the Hawaiian ali'i on Maui. His sister Margaret Clarissa (1859–1891) married politician and businessman Lorrin Thurston. A few years after Margaret's death, Thurston organized the overthrow of the Hawaiian Kingdom. W. H. Shipman's brother, Oliver Taylor Shipman (1857–1942), became a businessman and local government official. W. H. Shipman and his wife Mary had five daughters - Mary Mikahala, Clara, Caroline, Florence Lukini, and Margaret Beatrice, and 3 sons - William Reed, Oliver B., and Herber Cornelius, of whom only the youngest, Herbert Cornelius, survived his father. William Herbert Shipman died on July 8, 1943.

== Family business ==
Returning to Hawai'i after finishing college in the U.S., William Herbert became manager of Kapapala Ranch, which was owned jointly by his stepfather William Reed and C. B. Richardson. This early introduction to ranching had a lasting influence on Shipman. After he married, Shipman and his wife Mary moved to Kapoho, Hawaii, the easternmost point of the island, in the Puna District. Reed died in 1880 with no children of his own, and Shipman inherited the Reed land holdings.

In 1881 Shipman and two partners (Captain J. E. Eldarts and S. M. Damon) purchased the entire ahupaʻa (ancient land division) of Keaʻau, about 70,000 acres (28,000 ha), for $20,000 from the King Lunalilo estate. Shipman went into business for himself in 1882, buying out his partners and eventually founding the W. H. Shipman Limited corporation in 1923. The family also had a dairy and poultry farm. Shipman was involved in several court cases over this land, including "Shipman v. Nawahi" of 1886, named for Puna lawyer Joseph Nāwahī.

In 1898, the U.S. annexed the Hawaiian islands (after years of lobbying by Shipman's former brother-in-law Lorrin Thurston) which became the Territory of Hawaii. This meant agricultural products shipped to the vast U.S. market were no longer subject to any customs duties. Shipman leased much of his land to grow sugar cane, coffee, and other tropical fruit. In 1899 he leased properties to the new Olaʻa Sugar Company in Keaʻau. A large mill was built in 1900, which operated until 1982 (then called the Puna Sugar Company).

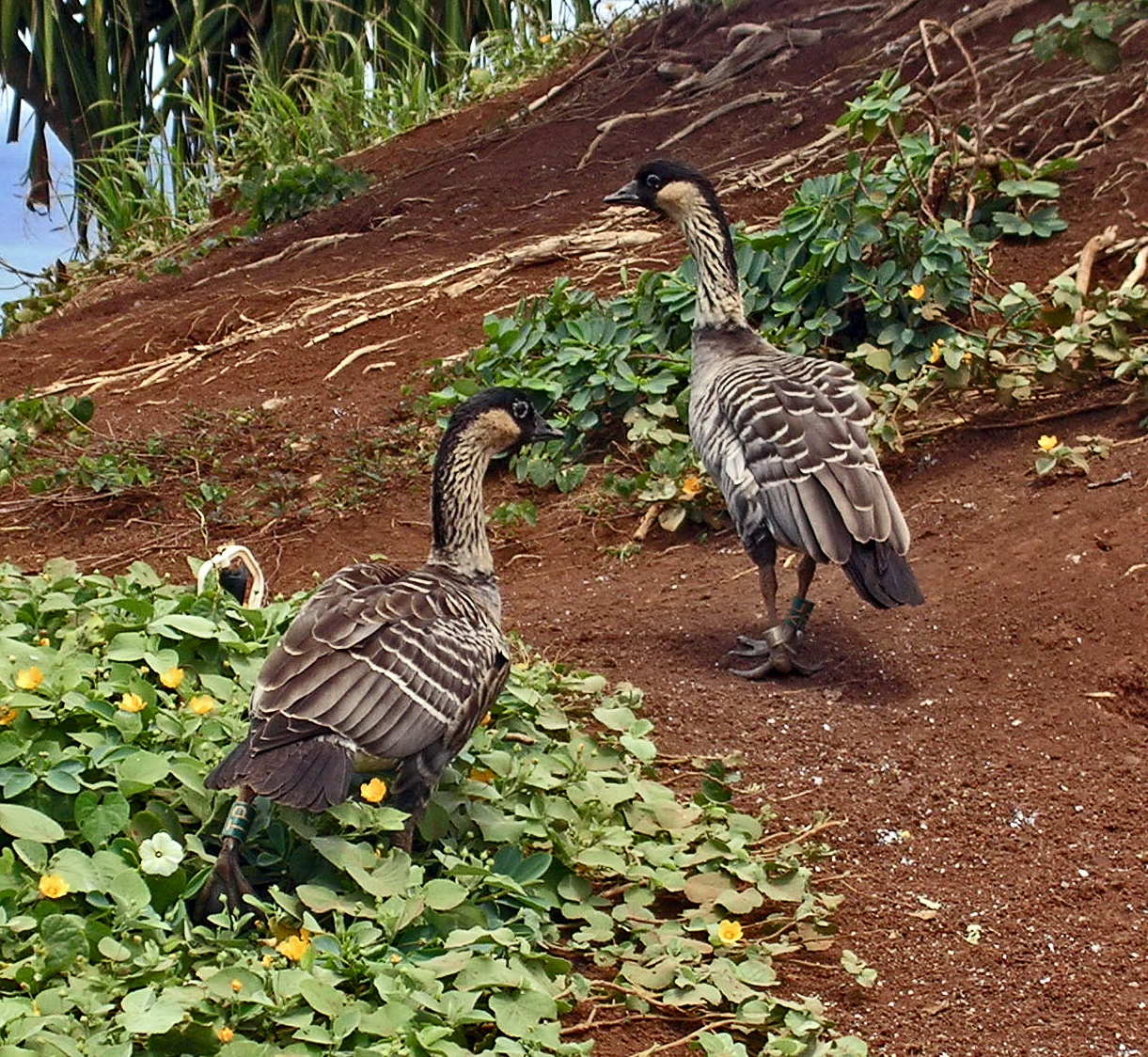
The endangered nēnē, a Hawaiian goose

Shipman built a house in 1904 near the remote Haena beach on his land, coordinates 19°38′32″N 154°59′7″W. In the Hawaiian language, hāʻena means "red hot", probably due to being downhill from the Kīlauea volcano. In 1911, Shipman formed the Hilo Meat Company to market the cattle from his own ranches, his older brother Oliver B. Shipman's ranch, and the large Parker Ranch located on the northern part of the island.

William Herbert's youngest son Herbert Cornelius Shipman (1892–1976) took over the W.H. Shipman Company in 1943 after his father's death. Herbert is best known for breeding the endangered Hawaiian goose (known as nēnē in the Hawaiian language, Branta sandvicensis). He started with four birds in 1918 at his coastal Puna Shipman estate, eventually moving the breeding program to the family's 'Ainahou Ranch after the 1946 tsunami almost decimated his existing flocks. He is credited with saving the breed and keeping the nēnē from extinction. Herbert also started commercial growing of orchids and introduced the anthurium to the Island of Hawai'i.

In 1948, some of the Shipman land on Hawai'i was sold and planted with macadamia nut trees, which has grown into the Mauna Loa Macadamia Nut Corporation plantation.

In 1959, the W. H. Shipman Company sold about 15 square miles (39 km^{2}) of land which became the Hawaiian Paradise Park subdivision in the Puna District, south of Hilo. Because of the agricultural zoning, lots are all 1-acre (4,000 m^{2}) in size. In 2009, the company still owned about 17,000 acres (69 km^{2}) in the Puna District, including an industrial park near the current town of Keaʻau. Hawaii state law requires public access to all ocean shorelines, however, controversies have surrounded attempts to keep vehicles off the roads through the Shipman Puna property.

In 1976 a park in Keaʻau was named in Herbert Shipman's honor, at coordinates 19°37′17″N 155°2′32″W.

After Herbert's death, his nephew Roy Shipman Blackshear (1923–2006) continued the work of raising nēnē, and headed the W.H. Shipman Company from 1976 until 1994. In 2002, Roy Blackshear resigned from the board and retired and his nephew William Walter became chairman of the board. In 2005 William Walter became president and CEO of the company then managed cooperatively with his cousin Thomas English, both descendants of William H. Shipman.
