= List of conflicts in Hawaii =

This is a list of wars, bloodless wars, battles, conspiracies, rebellions, revolutions, nonviolent revolutions, massacres, and terrorist attacks in the Hawaiian Islands.

== Ancient warfare ==
There were many ancient Hawaiian battles and wars through 1782, some of which might be mythical.

- Naval skirmish between King Kumuhonua of Oahu and his brothers over land successions. (11th century)
- First Oahuan Revolution/ Battle of Lihue Fortress. (13/14th century)
- Conflicts under Maʻilikākahi. (13/14th century)
  - Battle of Waikakalaua. (14th century)
  - First Mauian Invasion of Oahu. (14th century)
- The War of the Oahuan Succession. (15th century)
  - Second Oahuan Revolution/Battle between Lelepaua and Kapuaikaula. (15th century)
  - Ambush of Waikiki. (15th century)
  - Waialua and Koolauloa's wars. (15th century)
- Conflicts under Kauai. (17th century)
  - Battle of Kawaluna. (17th century)
  - Raid of Hilo. (17th century)
  - Battle of Moomomi. (17th century)
- First Oahuan Invasion of Molokai. (after 1730)
  - Battle of Kawela. (around 1737)
- Second Oahuan Invasion of Molokai. (after 1740)
- Alapainui's Invasion of Oahu. (around 1738)
- Third Oahuan Revolution. (around 1773)
- Conflicts under Kahahana. (18th century)
  - some battle on the Big Island. (18th century)
  - Second Mauian Invasion of Oahu. (around late 1782 or early 1783)
    - Battle of Seven Warriors (around 1782)
    - Battle of Kaheiki Stream (January 1783)
    - The Waipi‘o-Kimopo (1783/4/5)

Unification of Hawaiʻi (1782–1810)

- Battle of Keawawa (1738)
- Battle of Waikapu Commons (1776)
- Battle of Moku'ohai (1782)
- Olowalu Massacre (1790)
- Battle of Kepaniwai (1790)
- East Hawaiʻi Battles of 1790 (1790)
- Battle of Kawaihae (1791)
- Battle of Nu'uanu (1795)

== Kingdom of Hawaii ==
King Kamehameha I united the islands under his rule, establishing the Kingdom of Hawaii. He survived 9 year after the annexation of Kauaʻi and Niʻihau islands from Kaumualiʻi, the last of the eight main Hawaiian Islands.

- Russian Construction Of Fortresses On Kauai (1815-17)

Kamehameha forces Russians out of Kauai and abandon fortresses.

- Battle of Kuamoʻo (1819)

Kekuaokalani, nephew of Kamehameha I, killed during his rebellion against Liholiho.

- Humehume rebellion (1824)

Son of Kaumualiʻi failed to take back Kauaʻi island.

- French Incident (1839)

Military intervention by Captain Laplace of the French Navy to end religious persecution promoted by protestant missionaries in Hawaii.

- Paulet Affair (1843)

Rogue Captain George Paulet of HMS Carysfort forced Kamehameha III to cede Hawaii to the United Kingdom; Admiral Richard Darton Thomas restored the Kingdom.

- French Invasion of Honolulu (1849)

Captain Louis Tromelin attempted to reduce trade limits on French imports and end remaining persecution of Roman Catholics. The invasion resulted in $100,000 of damages in failure to meet the demands.

- 1873 Barracks Revolt (1873)

Members of the Hawaiian Army rebel against their officers and seize ʻIolani Barracks. The mutineers end the revolt after agreeing to an offer of full amnesty for their actions.

=== Hawaiian Revolutions (1887–1895) ===
- 1887 Rebellion (1887)

Descendants of Protestant missionaries known as the Missionary Party force King Kalākaua to ratify Bayonet Constitution under threat of assassination.

- Dominis Conspiracy

Princess Liliʻuokalani plotted to overthrow King David Kalākaua in a military Coup d'état, but the plot was exposed.

- Wilcox Rebellion of 1889 (1889)

Duke Robert William Wilcox fails to annul Bayonet Constitution and restore the prior Constitution

- Overthrow of the Hawaiian Kingdom (1893)

Members of the Missionary Party in the Legislature overthrow the monarchy.

== Provisional Government of Hawaii ==
Following the overthrow of the Kingdom, the Missionary Party established a transitional government known as the Provisional Government of Hawaii between the end of the monarchy and the annexation of Hawaii.

- Leper War on Kauaʻi (1893)

Leprosy colony on Kauaʻi rebels against forced relocation to Kalaupapa peninsula.

- Black Week (1893–1894)

President Grover Cleveland threatened revolutionists after the overthrow with a military intervention by the United States to restore the Kingdom of Hawaii, the intended intervention was rejected by Congress.

== Republic of Hawaii ==
After hostilities toward the Provisional Government and increasing pressure for the queen's return, the legislature formed the Republic of Hawaii as a de facto government.

Hawaiian Revolutions (1887–1895) (continued)

- 1895 Wilcox rebellion (1895), also known as the 1895 Counter-Revolution: Robert William Wilcox, a soldier and politician, and Colonel Samuel Nowlein, former commander of the Royal Guard, attempted to restore the monarchy in a failed counter-revolution. The conflict included battles at Diamond Head, Moʻiliʻili, and Mānoa.

== Territory of Hawaii ==
William McKinley ratifies the Newlands Resolution, a joint resolution that annexes Hawaii to the United States. The Hawaiian Organic Act converted the government of the Republic into the government under the United States. The members of the Missionary Party continued to grow the sugar industry and imported labor from Japan, the Philippines, Korea and other Asian countries as well as Puerto Rican and Portuguese immigrants to work on their sugarcane plantations.

World War I (1914–1918)

8 German ships sought refuge in Honolulu Harbor; some were captured.

Hanapepe massacre (1924)

Police forcibly put down a strike by sugarcane plantation workers, leading to 16 picketers shot and killed.

Hilo Massacre (1938)

Striking stevedores stormed a police boundary leading to 50 wounded picketers.

World War II (1939–1945)

See below

- Attack on Pearl Harbor (1941)

Imperial Japanese Navy (IJN) launch a surprise attack on the United States at Pearl Harbor, killing nearly 2,500 people and causing American entry into World War II.

- Niihau Incident (1941)

IJN pilot Shigenori Nishikaichi crash-landed on the island of Niihau and attempted to control the population to keep from being taken prisoner and intelligence from being captured. He was killed in a standoff with civilians while taking a hostage.

- Operation K (1942)

Attempted reconnaissance mission to Pearl Harbor by IJN. Mission was aborted over O'ahu for poor visibility from clouds, but one of the planes dropped four bombs near Roosevelt High School in Honolulu. There were no casualties.

- Battle of Midway (1942)

IJN attempted to occupy Midway Atoll, but after devastating losses during aerial combat, the invasion was aborted.

Democratic Revolution of 1954 (1946–1958)

Asian plantation workers mostly of Japanese descent instigate a non-violent revolution that overthrows the Missionary Party, who had overthrown the monarchy prior.

== State of Hawaii ==
A year after the overthrow of the Missionary Party, John A. Burns the leader of the revolutionary movement successfully lobbies the US Congress to admit Hawaii as a state creating the State of Hawaii.

- East Wood Affair (1992)

The ship East Wood hijacked by Chinese illegal immigrants which it had been carrying 527 of.

- Hawaiian Sovereignty Movement (1969?-present)

Separatist movement by numerous nationalist factions to return Hawaii to independence.

- Pan Am Flight 830 (1982)

Bombing on a Boeing 747-121 by Palestinian terrorists. The plane landed after the explosion caused one fatality.

Hawaiian Sovereignty Movement (1969?-present) continued

- Statehood Day Takeover (2008)

Separatists seize ʻIolani Palace in a failed coup d'état.

== See also ==
- List of Hawaii-related topics
- List of battles
