= Hawaiian rebellions (1887–1895) =

Rebellions and revolutions against governments of Hawaii

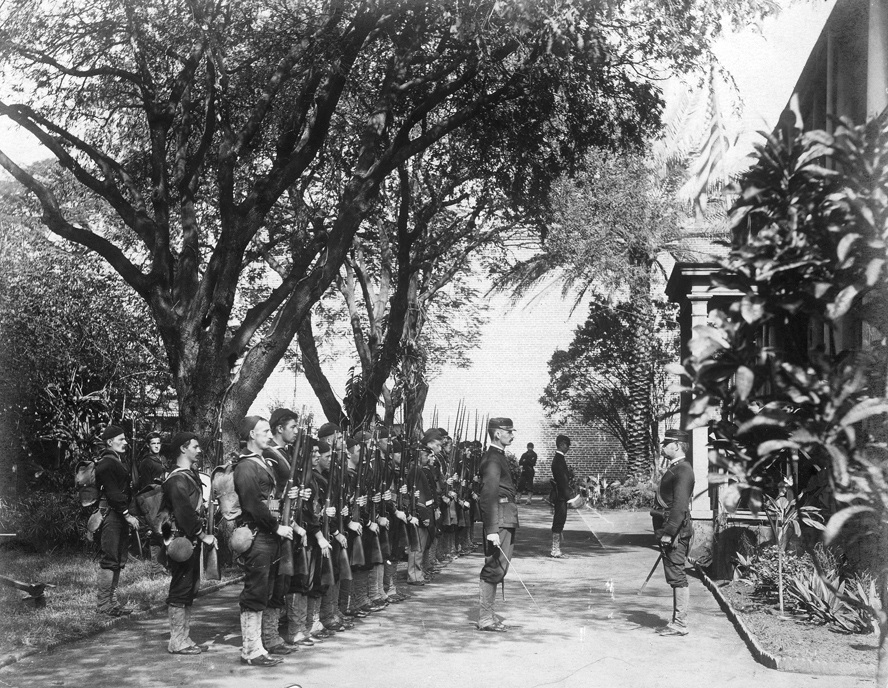
- The ship's landing force on duty at the Arlington Hotel, Honolulu, at the time of the overthrow of the Hawaiian monarchy, January 1893. Lieutenant Lucien Young, USN, commanded the detachment, and is presumably the officer at right.
Date	July 6, 1887 – January 9, 1895 (7 years, 6 months and 4 days)
Location	Hawaiian Islands
Result	Hawaiian League victory: Fall of the Kingdom of Hawaii; Republic of Hawaii established; 1895 Wilcox rebellion fails; Annexation of Hawaii by the United States; Territory of Hawaii established; Eventual creation of the State of Hawaii; US Congress issues 1993 official apology to Native Hawaiians for its involvement in the overthrow of the Kingdom of Hawaii.

Belligerents
Royalists: Hawaii; United States (Empire of Japan) Japan	Annexationists: Republic of Hawaii; United States: (United States) Hawaiian League	Other: Redshirts; Hawaiian Patriotic League

Commanders and leaders
(Hawaii) Kalākaua (Hawaii) Liliʻuokalani (Hawaii) Samuel Nowlein (Hawaii) Charles B. Wilson (Hawaii) Robert W. Wilcox (United States) Grover Cleveland (United States) Albert S. Willis	(United States) Lorrin A. Thurston (United States) Sanford B. Dole (United States) Edward G. Hitchcock (United States) John H. Soper (United States) John L. Stevens	Liliʻuokalani; Robert W. Wilcox; Robert N. Boyd Charles B. Wilson

Strength
Hawaii; 600 (peak); United States; 2 Warships (peak); Japan; 2 Warships (peak); United Kingdom 1 Warship (peak)	1,500 (peak)	~300 (peak)

Casualties and losses
~13–23 killed ~12–20 Wounded	2 killed ~5–10 Wounded	~6–16 killed ~12–20 Wounded ~190+ Captured/Arrested
- During the course of the rebellions, commanders and combatants changed their allegiances.

The Hawaiian rebellions and revolutions took place in Hawaii between 1887 and 1895. Until annexation in 1898, Hawaii was an independent sovereign state, recognized by the United States, United Kingdom, France, and Germany with exchange of ambassadors. However, there were several challenges to the reigning governments of the Kingdom and Republic of Hawaii during the 8 1/2-year (1887–1895) period.

== Rebellion of 1887 ==
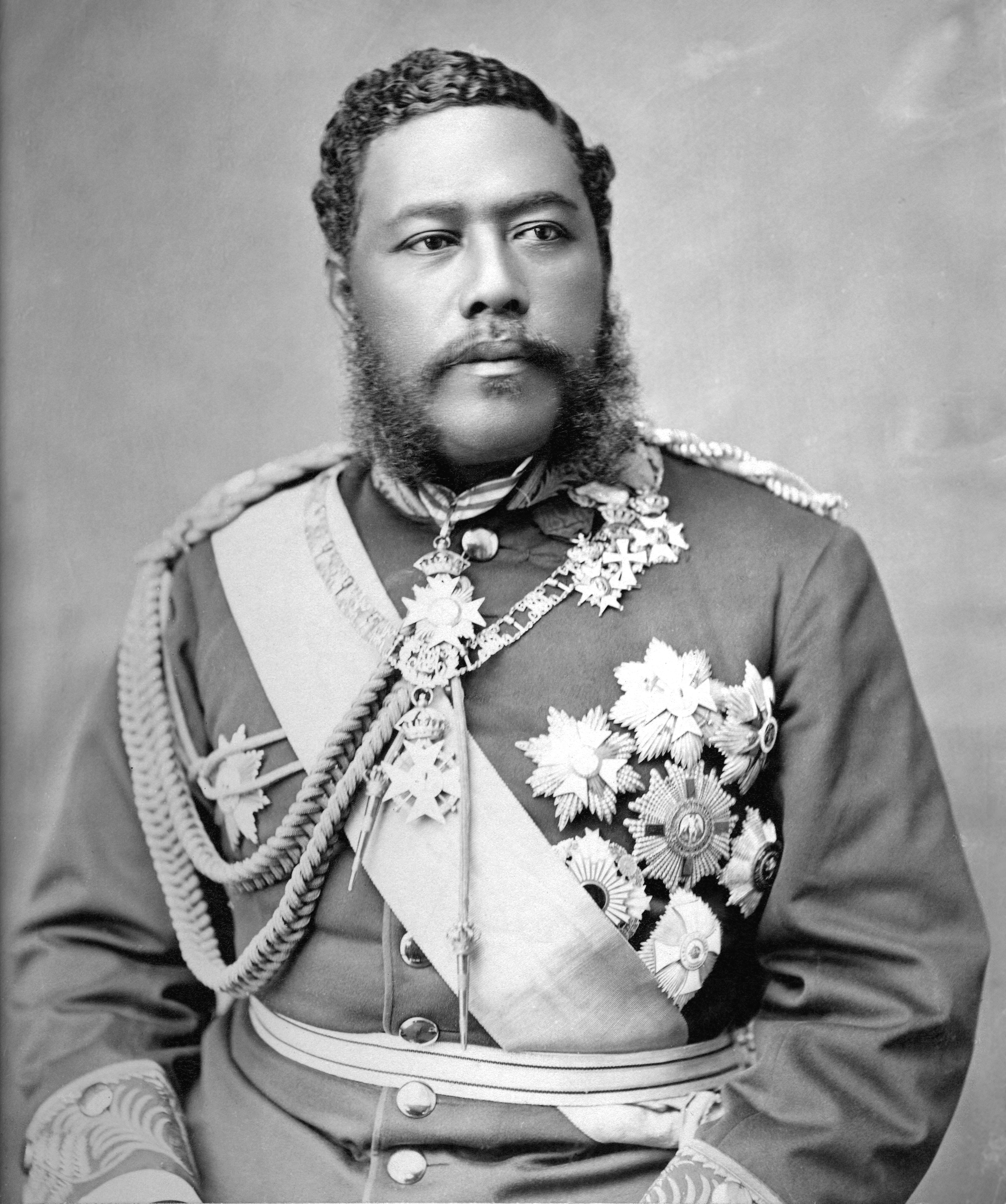
King Kalākaua

In 1887, a group of cabinet officials and advisors to King Kalākaua and an armed militia forced the king to promulgate what is known by its critics as the "Bayonet Constitution". The impetus behind the imposition of the 1887 constitution was the frustration amongst members of the Reform Party (also known as the Missionary Party) with the growing debt of the Kingdom, the spending habits of the King, and general governance of the Kingdom. It was specifically triggered by an ill-fated attempt by Kalakaua to create a Polynesian Federation under his rule, and a bribery scandal Kalakaua was involved in regarding opium licenses. The 1887 constitution stripped the monarchy of much of its authority, imposed significant income and property requirements for voting, and completely disenfranchised all Asians from voting. Only well-to-do Europeans, Americans and native Hawaiians were given full voting rights. When Kalākaua died in 1891 during a visit to San Francisco, his sister Liliʻuokalani assumed the throne.

Native Hawaiians on the other hand, according to Queen Liliʻuokalani in her autobiography, called her brother's reign "a golden age materially for Hawaii" and felt that the new constitution was imposed by a minority of the foreign population because of the king's refusal to renew the Reciprocity Treaty, which now included an amendment that would have allowed the US Navy to have a permanent naval base at Pearl Harbor in O'ahu, and the king's foreign policy. According to bills submitted by the King to the Hawaiian parliament, the King's foreign policy included an alliance with Japan and supporting other Malay countries suffering from colonialism. Native Hawaiians were deeply opposed to a permanent US military presence in their country.

At the time of the Bayonet Constitution of 1887 Grover Cleveland was president, and his secretary of state Thomas F. Bayard sent written instructions to the American minister George W. Merrill that in the event of another revolution in Hawaii, it was a priority to protect American commerce, lives and property. Bayard specified, "the assistance of the officers of our Government vessels, if found necessary, will therefore be promptly afforded to promote the reign of law and respect for orderly government in Hawaii." In July 1889, there was a small scale rebellion, and Minister Merrill landed Marines to protect Americans; the State Department explicitly approved his action. Merrill's replacement, minister John L. Stevens, read those official instructions, and followed them in his controversial actions of 1893.

== Rebellion of 1888 ==
A plot by Princess Liliʻuokalani was exposed to overthrow King Kalākaua in a military coup.

== Rebellion of 1889 ==
In 1889, a rebellion of Native Hawaiians led by Colonel Robert Wilcox and Robert Boyd attempted to replace the hated Bayonet Constitution and stormed 'Iolani Palace. The rebellion was later crushed. The United States landed Marines to protect American interests, an action later officially endorsed by the State Department.

== Rebellion of 1892 ==
A plot by Native Hawaiians led by Colonel Robert Wilcox attempted to overthrow the monarchy.

== Coup d'état of 1893 ==
According to Queen Liliʻuokalani in her autobiography, Hawaiʻi's Story by Hawaiʻi's Queen, immediately upon ascending the throne, she received petitions from 2/3 of her subjects and the major Native Hawaiian political party in parliament, Hui Kālaiʻāina, asking her to proclaim a new constitution. Believing her actions were supported by both her cabinet and her Native Hawaiian subjects, Liliʻuokalani drafted a new constitution that would restore the monarchy's authority and strip American and European residents of the suffrage they had obtained in 1887 by threat of force against King Kalakaua.

In response to Liliʻuokalani's attempt to promulgate a new constitution, a group of European and American residents formed a "Committee of Safety" on January 14, 1893, in opposition to the Queen and her plans. After a mass meeting of supporters, the Committee committed itself to the removal of the Queen, and seeking annexation to the United States.

United States Government Minister John L. Stevens Follow the explicit policy that it been laid out by President Cleveland's Secretary of State back in 1887, on the need to use American military forces to protect American interests in Hawaii during a revolutionary episode. Stevens summoned a company of uniformed US Marines from the USS Boston and two companies of US sailors to land on the kingdom and take up positions at the US Legation, Consulate, and Arion Hall on the afternoon of January 16, 1893. This deployment was at the request of the Committee of Safety, which claimed an "imminent threat to American lives and property". The royal military and police forces made no effort whatever to interfere, to stop the revolution, or to protect the Queen. Historian William Russ states, "the injunction to prevent fighting of any kind made it impossible for the monarchy to protect itself." A provisional government was set up with the strong support of the Honolulu Rifles, a militia group which had defended the Kingdom against the Wilcox rebellion in 1889. Under this pressure, Liliʻuokalani gave up her throne to the Committee of Safety. The Queen's statement yielding authority, on January 17, 1893, also pleaded for justice:

I Liliʻuokalani, by the Grace of God and under the Constitution of the Hawaiian Kingdom, Queen, do hereby solemnly protest against any and all acts done against myself and the Constitutional Government of the Hawaiian Kingdom by certain persons claiming to have established a Provisional Government of and for this Kingdom.

That I yield to the superior force of the United States of America whose Minister Plenipotentiary, His Excellency John L. Stevens, has caused United States troops to be landed at Honolulu and declared that he would support the Provisional Government.

Now to avoid any collision of armed forces, and perhaps the loss of life, I do this under protest and impelled by said force yield my authority until such time as the Government of the United States shall, upon facts being presented to it, undo the action of its representatives and reinstate me in the authority which I claim as the Constitutional Sovereign of the Hawaiian Islands.

Despite repeated claims that the overthrow was "bloodless", the Queen's Book notes to the contrary that Liluʻokalani received "friends [who] expressed their sympathy in person; amongst these Mrs. J. S. Walker, who had lost her husband by the treatment he received from the hands of the revolutionists. He was one of many who from persecution had succumbed to death."

An immediate investigation into the events of the overthrow was commissioned by President Cleveland and conducted by former Congressman James Henderson Blount. The Blount Report was completed on July 17, 1893, and concluded that "United States diplomatic and military representatives had abused their authority and were responsible for the change in government."

Minister Stevens was recalled, and the military commander of forces in Hawaii was forced to resign his commission. President Cleveland stated "Substantial wrong has thus been done which a due regard for our national character as well as the rights of the injured people requires we should endeavor to repair the monarchy." Cleveland further stated in his 1893 State of the Union Address and that, "Upon the facts developed it seemed to me the only honorable course for our Government to pursue was to undo the wrong that had been done by those representing us and to restore as far as practicable the status existing at the time of our forcible intervention." Submitting the matter to Congress on December 18, 1893, after President Sanford Dole refused to reinstate the Queen on Cleveland's command, the Senate Foreign Relations Committee under Chairman Morgan, continued investigation into the matter.

On February 26, 1894, the Morgan Report was submitted, contradicting the Blount Report and finding Stevens and the US troops "not guilty" of any involvement in the overthrow. The report asserted that, "The complaint by Liliuokalani in the protest that she sent to the President of the United States and dated the 18th day of January, is not, in the opinion of the committee, well founded in fact or in justice." After submission of the Morgan Report, Cleveland ended any efforts to reinstate the monarchy, and conducted normal diplomatic relations with the Provisional Government and later, the Republic of Hawaii. He rebuffed further entreaties from the Queen to intervene further in the matter.

The Republic of Hawaii was established July 4, 1894 under the presidency of Sanford Dole.

== Black Week ==
Although not a rebellion, the Black Week was a near-war event directly related to the Hawaiian rebellions. United States Minister to Hawaii John L. Stevens was forced to retire after supporting the overthrow of the monarchy. He was replaced by James Henderson Blount. After completing the Blount Report, Blount was replaced by Albert S. Willis. Willis, against America's present neutrality toward Hawaii, threatened an amphibious invasion to force the Provisional Government to restore the Queen. The threat failed to restore the monarchy, but did prolong annexation.

== Rebellion of 1895 ==
In 1895, a counter-rebellion led by Colonel Samuel Nowlein, Minister Joseph Nawahi, members of the Royal Household Guards, and later Robert Wilcox attempted to overthrow the Republic of Hawaii and restore the monarchy, and led to the conviction and imprisonment of the former Queen Liliuokalani and dissolution of the exiled royal government. According to A History of Hawaiʻi by Professor Ralph Kuykendall, the 1895 counter-rebellion was also heavily financed by Chinese and Japanese immigrants, who had felt some loyalty to Queen Liliʻuokalani.

== See also ==
- Honolulu Courthouse Riot
