= Robert Napuʻuako Boyd =

Native Hawaiian insurgent leader (1864–1914)

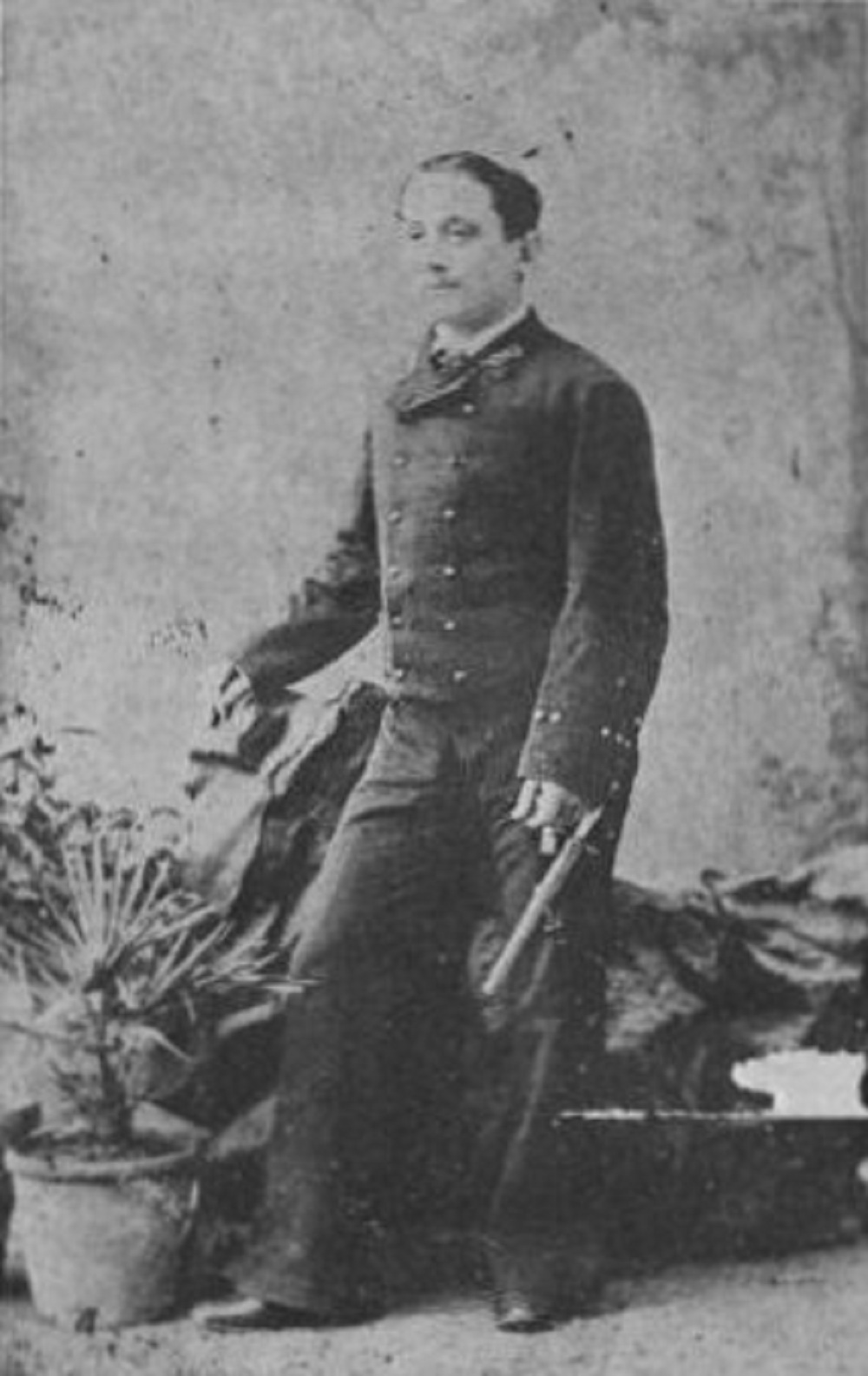
- Boyd in Livorno, Italy, c. 1884
- Born: September 2, 1864; Honolulu, Kingdom of Hawaii
- Died: September 9, 1914 (aged 50); Honolulu, Hawaii, U.S.
- Burial place: Oahu Cemetery
- Relatives: James Harbottle Boyd
- Military career
- Allegiance: Kingdom of Hawaii; United States
- Conflicts: Wilcox rebellion of 1889

Robert Napuʻuako (Note: Sometimes written as Napunako.) Boyd (Hawaiian pronunciation: [ˌnɐpuʔuˈwɐko]; September 2, 1864 – September 9, 1914) was a Native Hawaiian insurgent leader during the latter years of the Kingdom of Hawaii. Educated under the government-funded study program of King Kalākaua, he attended the Royal Naval Academy in Livorno, Italy. He became a friend of Robert William Wilcox, another Hawaiian student enrolled in Turin. They were both recalled back in Hawaii after the government stopped funding their education. Back home, he participated with Wilcox in the unsuccessful Wilcox rebellion of 1889 aimed at restoring political power to the king.

== Early life ==
Boyd was born September 2, 1864, in Honolulu, to Edwin Harbottle Boyd (1834–1875) and Maria Punapanaewa Adams Boyd (1841–1891). He was of British and Hawaiian descent. His two-time great-grandfather John Harbottle (1781–1830) was a British naval officer, one of the first foreign residents in Hawaii, and Kamehameha I's port pilot. Harbottle's wife, High Chiefess Papapaunauapu, was the adoptive granddaughter of Kamehameha I. His paternal grandfather Robert Lopaka Boyd (1785–1870), who married one of Harbottle's daughters, had served as the King's shipbuilder, and it is believed that he came from the British West Indies. Boyd's maternal grandfather, Alexander Adams, of Scottish descent, was another well-known foreign advisor of the King and has been credited by some historians as the designer of the flag of Hawaii.

The Boyds were considered among the most prominent families of Hawaii, and their residence in Maunawili was often frequented by Hawaiian royalty, visiting foreign dignitaries, and world-famous writers and artists. Boyd's father made his fortune as a merchant and cattle rancher and served many political posts in the legislature of the kingdom, while his elder brother James Harbottle Boyd was a court official and colonel on the staffs of King Kalākaua and Queen Liliuokalani.

== Education in Italy ==
Boyd began his education at Punahou School, known as Oahu College at the time. In 1880, King Kalākaua established a government-funded program for promising Hawaiian youths to be educated abroad. Boyd; James Kaneholo Booth, his Punahou classmate; and Robert William Wilcox, a Maui-born schoolteacher in Honolulu, were chosen as the first students of the Hawaiian study abroad program. They were sent to Europe along with Celso Caesar Moreno, a former cabinet minister who had been controversially dismissed. Kalākaua intended for them to be sent to Prussian military academies; however, once in Prussia, Moreno decided they were unsuited for the rigors of the Prussian schooling system. The three Hawaiian youths were enrolled in different military academies in Moreno's native Italy instead. Wilcox and Booth were enrolled at the Royal Military Academy in Turin and Royal Military Academy in Naples, respectively, while Boyd was enrolled in the Royal Naval Academy at Livorno.

During Kalākaua's 1881 world tour, the king and his entourage were greeted by Moreno, Booth, and Boyd at the Naples pier. Later, in an audience with Umberto I of Italy and his wife Margherita of Savoy, they learned that Moreno had misrepresented the three students as Kalākaua's natural (i.e., illegitimate) sons. After this revelation, Moreno was dismissed as the guardian of the three students and Michael Cerulli, who later became Hawaiian consul-general in Naples, was appointed to take care of their needs.

The frugal spending allowance given to the youths was often only enough for their basic necessities. Boyd often wrote home to Walter Murray Gibson, the king's prime minister, to ask for additional funds. Encouraged by Moreno, they sought the same lifestyle as their more affluent Italian classmates who were able to travel during school holidays. In 1884, Boyd's failure to pass his final exam greatly distressed him. In a letter dated March 27, 1884, he wrote home to the king, informing him about his failure to pass his exams and begging him to allow him return to the islands:

Now Your Majesty must know the truth, and nothing else but the truth, I am five years abroad, and during this short period I have suffered more than a man of forty; I have had vengance, I have had a duel, and lastly I have had enemies: all for the sake of my country. Their has[sic] been times in which I wished to runaway and beg for my living, but when I think of your kindness towards me, my passion calms quickly, and I dream of the happy future: But at last I have come to the conclusion not to suffer anymore, my studies to the present are not at all little; and perhaps sufficient to earn my living as a gentleman; Theirfore I am ready to come home and serve thee Sire, or else I shall run away because I would rather die a beggar than to be a slave. I will take a square resolution as soon as I receive Your Majesty's letter; but I swear in the name of my dead father that I will stay no longer in this revengeful country. The schooling ends on the 3rd of June, and I should wait for your answer in August, if at the end of this month I receive no answer, Your Majesty may calculate that I have no Country, I have no parents, and I have no king; I will be a roamer all the days of my life, like a Jew: I will come back to serve you as a souldier, and even as a shoeblacker; but I will never be a slave. Your Majesty may be sure that these words are as true as If I had my hands on the bible while writtin it, theirfore give me hope, and let me die in peace: I will repeat again, that my education is quite sufficient. I can come home alone, not as a child, but as a young man of 21 years old. I have the honor to wish his Majesty a prosperous reign and a long life.

Despite these setbacks, Boyd continued in his education until the summer of 1887. After passing his final examinations in June, Boyd reunited with his brother Colonel James Harbottle Boyd and attended the Golden Jubilee of Queen Victoria with the Hawaiian delegation led by Queen Kapiolani and Crown Princess Liliuokalani. While in London, Colonel Boyd wrote to the Hawaiian government about the future for his brother. However, news of political unrest back home prompted the Hawaiian royal party to return to the islands in July. Boyd stayed behind in Liverpool until he also returned to Hawaii on October 22, 1887, aboard the steamer Adriatic.

== Return to Hawaii and the Wilcox rebellion ==
Back in Hawaii, the Bayonet Constitution of 1887 was imposed on King Kalākaua by the Reform Party (led by many descendants of American missionaries) with the help of the Honolulu Rifles. Funds for the study abroad program were discontinued by the legislature in 1887 and 1890 and most of these remaining students were asked to return to Hawaii. Boyd and Wilcox were recalled by the Reform cabinet headed by Lorrin A. Thurston, who believed that "the government had spent enough money on the education of these young men." Boyd and Wilcox returned to a political atmosphere unfavorable to the king and his Hawaiian protège. No jobs were available to fit their years of military training.

Frustrated with these difficulties, Boyd joined Wilcox in his 1889 rebellion to overturn the Bayonet Constitution and restore the 1864 Constitution and the political power of the monarchy. Both men helped recruit participants in the rebellion. Boyd allegedly fired the first shot of the rebellion, on July 30, 1889. They took the grounds of ʻIolani Palace. However, the king was absent from the palace and feared the rebellion was an attempt to depose him in favor of his sister. The rebellion failed and a number of the rebels were arrested by the governmental forces. Boyd was shot during the fighting, receiving a scalp wound on the right side of his head, as well as being wounded in the thighs. He was not put on trial. Instead, George Markham and Boyd turned evidence against their fellow rebels and served as the primary witnesses for the prosecution. Wilcox, the leader of the rebellion, was arrested and tried for treason and conspiracy, but acquitted by a sympathetic Hawaiian jury.

== Later life ==
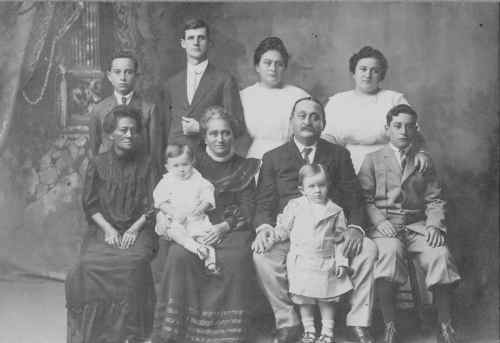
Robert Napuʻuako Boyd and his family

After the failed rebellion and the overthrow of the monarchy, Boyd continued to participate in politics. In 1900, he became a member of the Home Rule Party of Hawaii led by Wilcox, but he later switched political party and was elected surveyor of Oahu County in 1903 as a Republican. Professionally, Boyd worked as a surveyor.

Boyd died on September 9, 1914. While giving a speech at a political rally in Moʻiliʻili, Boyd suffered an acute heart attack and was rushed to the Queen's Hospital, Honolulu, where he died. Rev. Father Charles of the Catholic Mission officiated for his funeral on the following day, and he was buried in the family plot at the Oahu Cemetery.

Boyd married Josephine Williams (1860–1932), daughter of businessman Henry Williams. They lived in a two-story house in Honolulu, on the Pauoa side of Punchbowl at Waiolimu Street and Lusitana Street. The family "kept horses, sheep, turkeys, chickens and peacocks" at the house. They had four children: Rebecca Lehia Miles (1889–1940), Annie K. Lee (1894/95–1948), Robert Napuʻuako Jr. (1896–1968), and Victor Keliimaikai (1898–1966). Their granddaughter Kinaʻu Boyd Kamaliʻi (1930–2005) became a politician and served as a member of Hawaii House of Representatives for several years.

== Bibliography ==
- Allen, Helena G. (1982). The Betrayal of Liliuokalani: Last Queen of Hawaii, 1838–1917. Glendale, CA: A. H. Clark Company. ISBN 978-0-87062-144-4. OCLC 9576325.
- Allen, Helena G. (1995). Kalakaua: Renaissance King. Honolulu: Mutual Publishing. ISBN 978-1-56647-059-9. OCLC 35083815.
- Armstrong, William N. (1904). Around the World with a King. New York: F. A. Stokes Company. OCLC 489773.
- Brown, Malcolm (1918). Reminiscences of a Pioneer Kauai Family, with References and Anecdotes of Early Honolulu. Honolulu: Thos. McVeagh. OCLC 16342752.
- Conrad, Agnes C (1969). "Hawaiian Registered Vessels". The Hawaiian Journal of History. 3. Honolulu: Hawaiian Historical Society: 31–41. hdl:10524/103. OCLC 60626541.
- Liliuokalani (1898). Hawaii's Story by Hawaii's Queen, Liliuokalani. Boston: Lee and Shepard. ISBN 978-0-548-22265-2. OCLC 2387226.
- Quigg, Agnes (1988). "Kalakaua's Hawaiian Studies Abroad Program". The Hawaiian Journal of History. 22. Honolulu: Hawaiian Historical Society: 170–208. hdl:10524/103. OCLC 60626541.
- Kuykendall, Ralph Simpson (1967). The Hawaiian Kingdom 1874–1893, The Kalakaua Dynasty. Vol. 3. Honolulu: University of Hawaii Press. ISBN 978-0-87022-433-1. OCLC 500374815.
