= Wilcox rebellion of 1889 =

Revolt led by Robert Wilcox

- Part of the Hawaiian rebellions (1887–1895)
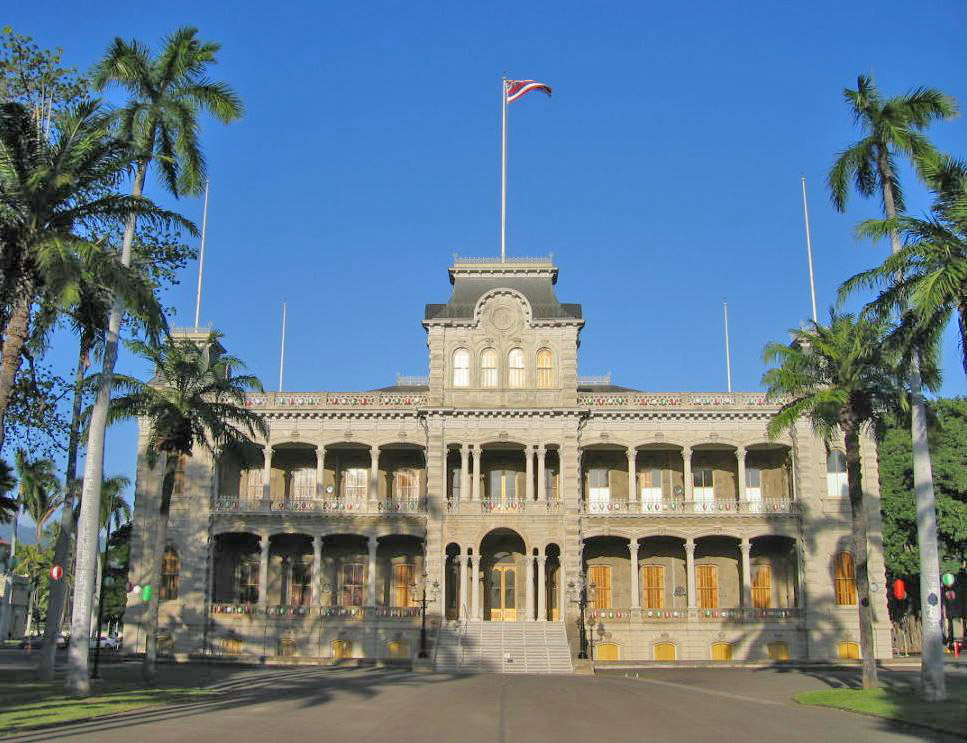
- Modern photo of Iolani Palace
Date	July 30, 1889
Location	Honolulu, Hawaii
Result	Decisive Reformist victory: Status quo ante bellum; 1887 Constitution maintained; Wilcox surrenders; Rebels tried and most serve one year sentences

Belligerents
Hawaiian League; Kingdom of Hawaii	Liberal Patriotic Association (Redshirts)

Commanders and leaders
(Hawaii) Volney V. Ashford (Hawaii) Kalākaua (Hawaii) John Paul Kahalewai (Hawaii) Robert Parker Waipa	Robert W. Wilcox (POW); Albert Loomens (POW); Robert N. Boyd (POW)

Strength
Honolulu Rifles 100–200 militiamen Kingdom of Hawaii; 30 Royal Guardsmen	150 militiamen

Casualties and losses
None	7–8 killed 12 wounded 70 captured

The Wilcox rebellion of 1889 (also known as the Wilcox insurrection of 1889) was a revolt led by Robert Wilcox to force King Kalākaua of Hawaii to reenact the Hawaiian Constitution of 1864 from the Constitution of 1887.

== Background ==
=== Liberal Patriotic Association ===
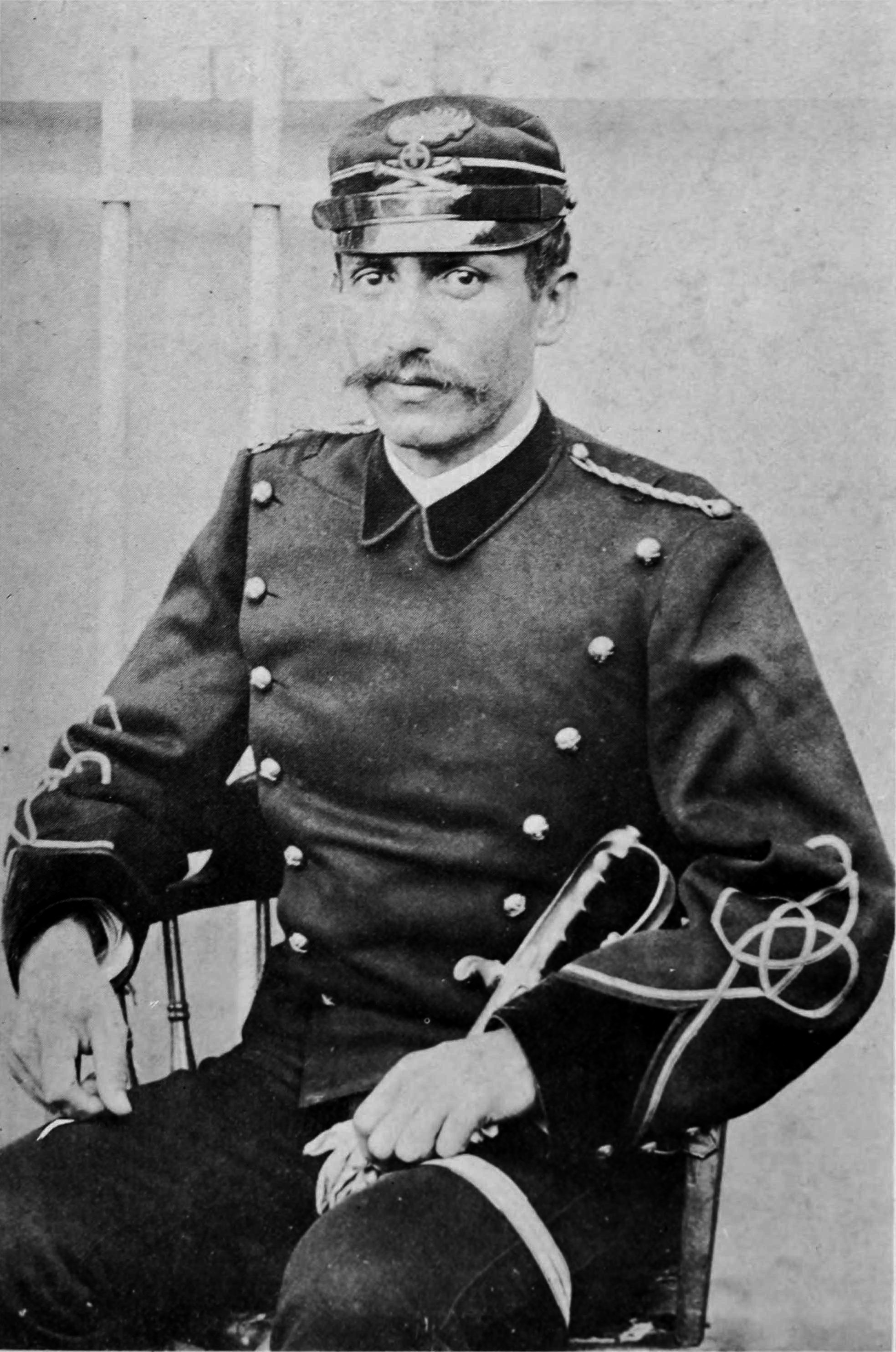
Robert William Wilcox

Robert Wilcox returned to Hawaii from San Francisco with the knowledge of Princess Liliʻuokalani and stayed at her Palama residence He organized another rebellion that took place on July 30, 1889 to revive the powers of the monarch by forcing King Kalākaua to reinstate the Constitution of 1864. Wilcox let Robert N. Boyd in on the plot. Boyd was a friend of Wilcox from his academy in Italy. Wilcox and Boyd recruited about 80 Hawaiians, Europeans, and Chinese to form the Liberal Patriotic Association. Chinese businessmen who lost rights under the Bayonet Constitution supported his plans and provided funding. Each rebel was bought a red shirt uniform inspired by Giuseppe Garibaldi's Redshirt volunteers, whom Wilcox admired.

=== Reform Party ===
The Bayonet Constitution was forced on Kalakaua by the Hawaiian League, a group of haole (foreign) businessmen, all citizens of Honolulu, with the support of the Honolulu Rifles, a volunteer regiment, authorized by the King but primarily loyal to the Reform Party, whose members were officers. The constitution was unpopular to many as it severely restricted the King's authority, and disenfranchised many of the common people by way of high property ownership requirements. The voting restrictions led the Reform Party to win the legislature in the elections on September 12, 1887, putting the government in the hands of American business interests.

=== King Kalākaua ===
The Bayonet Constitution left Kalakaua mainly a figurehead and gave the legislature most of the power. Being forewarned of the Rebellion approaching ʻIolani Palace the King stayed instead at Honuakaha, the private residence of Queen Kapiʻolani. One explanation is that he was initially supportive of Wilcox's plans until rumor reached him that the rebels intended to replace him with his sister Liliʻukolani, and so he avoided the palace. He move to a secret location, his boathouse, so that he could escape by sea if necessary, with an armed escort of twelve guards.

=== Battle ===
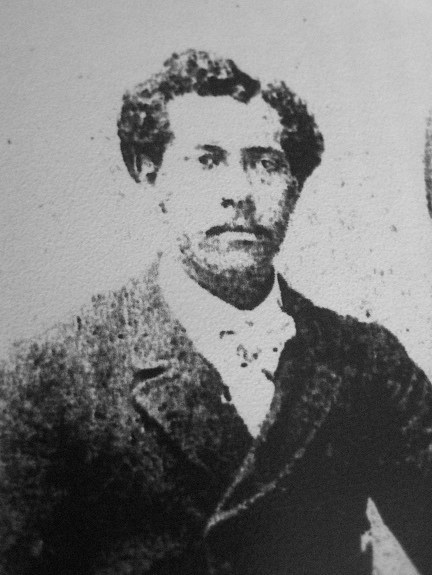
Lt. Robert Parker Waipa, commander of the 30 Royal Guards

On the morning of July 30, 1889 Wilcox's Redshirts entered the Palace grounds and surrounded ʻIolani Palace while others garrisoned surrounding buildings including Aliʻiōlani Hale and Kapuaiwa. The Redshirts aimed two captured heavy cannons at the palace where 30 Royal Guard were stationed. Lt. Robert Parker Waipa, commander of the 30 guards, in place of the absent Captain John Paul Kahalewai, refused to surrender. King Kalākaua was aware of the rebellion and had avoided the palace, fearing it was a new plot to overthrow him. The Reform Party alerted to the rebellion sent the Honolulu Rifles under the command of Colonel Ashford and three cannons to suppress this revolt. Ashford was a Canadian immigrant who had come to Hawaii to join his brother. The Rifles took up positions in nearby buildings, notably the Opera House and fired on the rebels. Snipers were stationed in the Kawaiahaʻo Church clock tower.

One of the cannons was turned and opened fire on the Opera House at close range, but the gun was also well within range of the riflemen and the crews were forced to abandon their cannons. The Redshirts were driven into surrounding buildings where they exchanged fire with the Honolulu Rifles. The Royal Guard at the palace maintained neutrality during the battle under Kalākaua's orders not to fire unless the rebels tried to enter the palace. Members of the Honolulu Rifles felt this to be an act of collaboration. There were fears that the 2nd Battalion Hawaiian Volunteers stationed at ʻIolani Barracks commanded by Major Samuel Nowlein (where the cannons were taken from without a struggle) who were sympathetic toward the rebels might even desert and join the battle with Wilcox, but this did not happen. Liliʻuokalani had gone to the guardsmen before the battle and ordered them to remain neutral during the fight. Shortly after noon the surrounding buildings were cleared of Wilcox’s men, including the twelve men in Aliʻiōlani Hale, leaving only the palace grounds and the buildings on it in rebel hands. Later on the Rifles used grenadiers with sticks of dynamite to attack the Palace Bungalow, then a Redshirts stronghold. They threw the dynamite over the walls encompassing the palace grounds. The explosions blew open the roof of the Palace Bungalow killing and wounding rebels. Shortly after the explosion Wilcox and his men surrendered.

=== Aftermath ===
By the end of the rebellion, Wilcox lost seven men (some sources say eight) and a dozen wounded, Boyd was one of them, wounded twice. The Bungalow was damaged beyond repairs and eventually demolished. Marines from the USS Adams patrolled the streets of Honolulu for a week. Most rebels received one-year imprisonments. George Markham and Boyd escaped trial by turning evidence for the prosecution. Wilcox was tried for treason, and acquitted by an all-Hawaiian jury. Lieutenant Albert Loomens, unlike Wilcox, was tried by an all-white jury for being a Belgian and only pure Caucasian of the Liberal Patriotic Association's leadership. Albert Loomens was the only one found guilty of his role in the rebellion and sentenced to be hanged, the punishment was later reduced to being exiled from Hawaii. The 2nd Battalion Hawaiian Volunteers was disbanded for their disloyalty toward the King and neutral stance during the rebellion. Two years later, in 1891, King Kalākaua died in San Francisco and Liliʻuokalani ascended the Hawaiian throne. Wilcox would hold a prominent position in her government as an elected member of the Royal Legislature.

== Bibliography ==
- Andrade Jr., Ernest (1996). Unconquerable Rebel: Robert W. Wilcox and Hawaiian Politics, 1880–1903. University Press of Colorado. ISBN 0-87081-417-6.
- Gessler, Clifford (2007). Hawaii - Isles of Enchantment. READ BOOKS.
- Forbes, David W. (2003). Hawaiian National Bibliography 1780–1900: Volume 4. University of Hawaii Press.
- Kuykendall, Ralph S. (1967). The Hawaiian Kingdom.: Volume 3--The Kalakaua Dynasty, 1874-1893. University of Hawaii Press.
- Tabrah, Ruth M. (1984). Hawaii. W. W. Norton & Company. 0393302202, 9780393302202.
- Twombly, Alexander Stevenson (1900). Hawaii and Its People. Silver, Burdett and Company.
- Wong, Helen and Ann Rayson (1987). Hawaii's Royal History. Bess Press.
