= Haleʻākala =

Historic structure in Honolulu, Hawaii, United States

Coordinates: 21.3085°N 157.8615°W

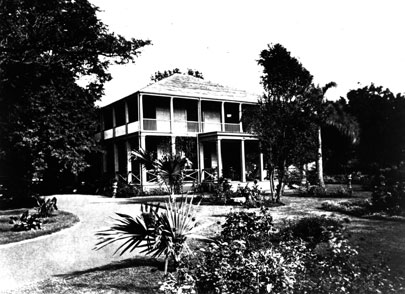
Haleʻākala, c. 1875

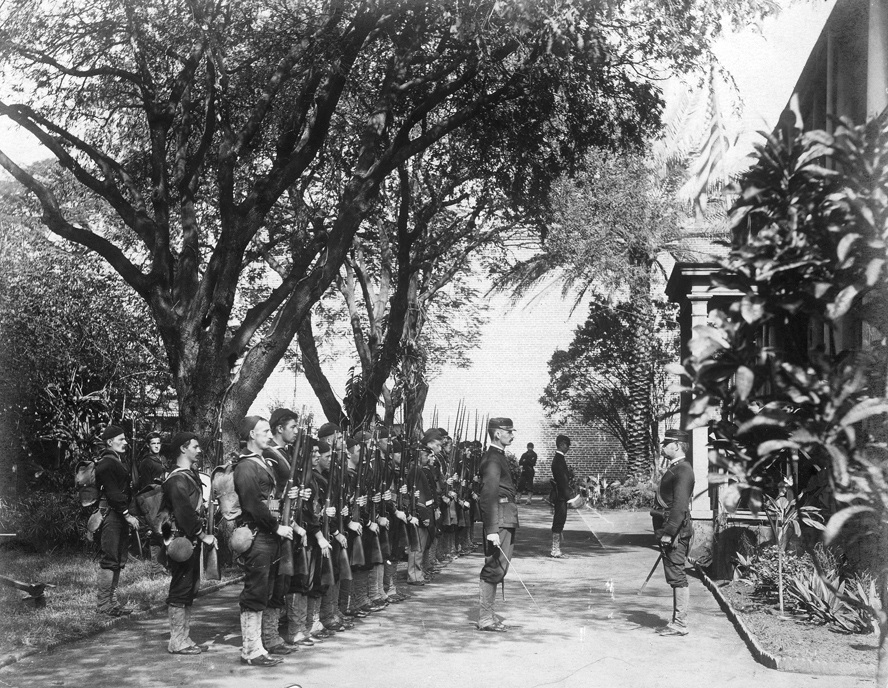
The ship's landing force on duty at the Arlington Hotel in 1893. Lucien Young is presumably the officer at right.

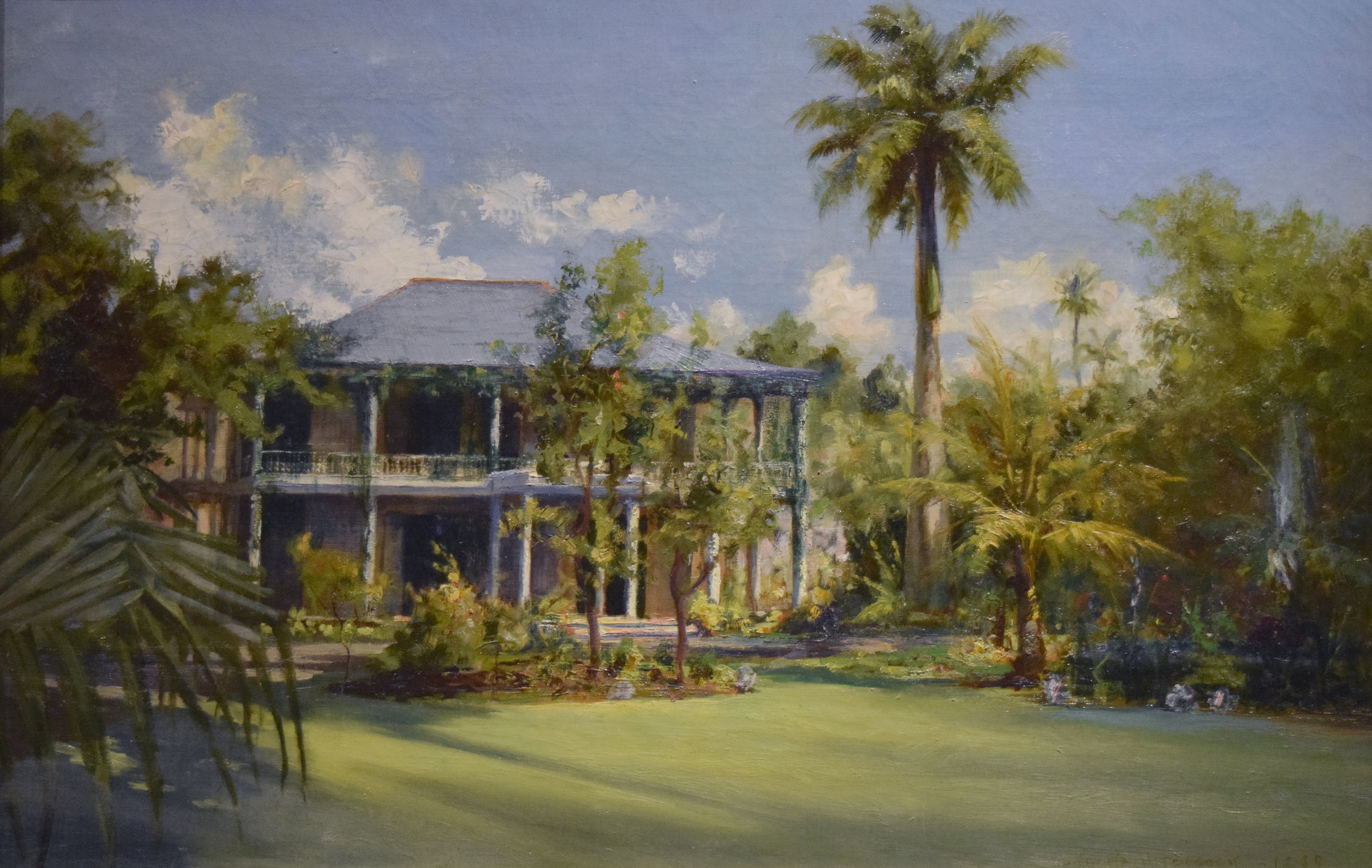
Haleʻākala, oil on canvas by D. Howard Hitchcock, 1899

Haleʻākala, later renamed ʻAikupika, and then the Arlington Hotel, was a historic structure in Honolulu, Hawaii, which was the home of various prominent Hawaiians, and later became a hotel, and the initial headquarters of the American military forces involved in the overthrow of the Kingdom of Hawaii.

== History ==
The two-story pink coral house was built in Honolulu, on King Street, around the 1850s by Hawaiian high chief Pākī, who initially lived there with his wife Kōnia and their hānai daughter, Lydia Pākī, the natural daughter of Keohokalole and Kapaakea. The house was called Haleʻākala, sometimes translated as House of the Sun (Haleakalā), but probably meant Pink House after the coral rock from which the house was constructed. Pākī built the house himself, replacing the original grass hut complex of the same name at the same site, financed by the sale of Mākaha Valley. It would later become one of the primary residences of his daughter Bernice Pauahi Bishop, and her husband, Charles Reed Bishop. Duke Kahanamoku was also born in Haleʻākala while Bishop lived there. The house was later called ʻAikupika (Egypt). Later still, it became the Arlington Hotel.

At the time of the overthrow of the Hawaiian monarchy in January 1893, United States Navy Lieutenant Lucien Young commanded a detachment from the USS Boston which mustered at "Camp Boston", initially established at the Arlington Hotel.

The building was purchased at auction in 1900, and demolished to make way for a bank.
