= Samuel Nowlein =

Hawaiian colonel (1851–1905)

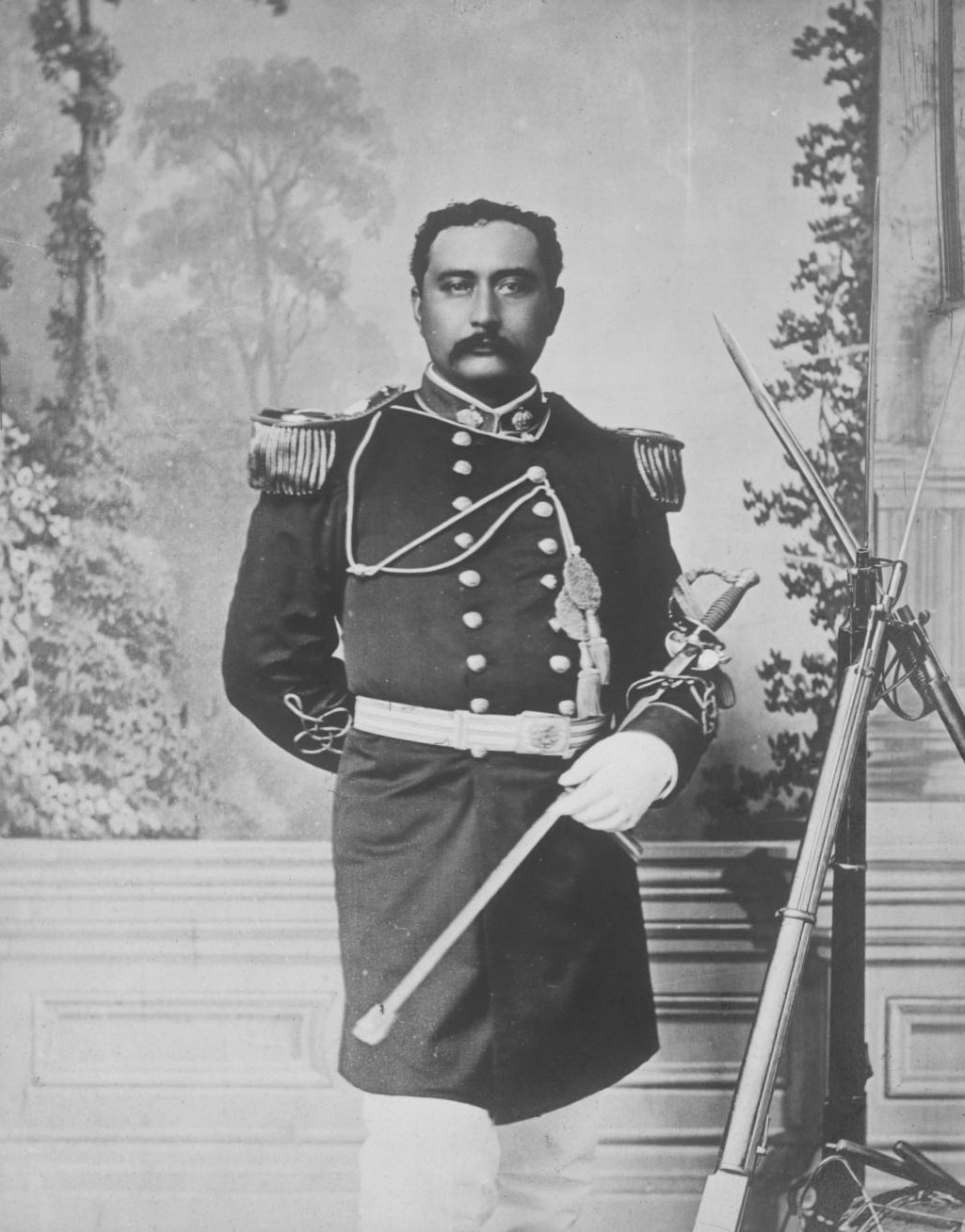
- Born: April 3, 1851; Keapukukaloa, Molokai, Hawaii
- Died: December 5, 1905 (aged 54); Lahaina, Hawaii, United States
- Children: 3
- Military career
- Allegiance: Hawaiian Kingdom
- Branch: Royal Guards of Hawaii
- Service years: 1885–1895
- Rank: Captain
- Conflicts: Overthrow of the Hawaiian Kingdom; 1895 Wilcox rebellion (POW)

Samuel Nowlein (April 3, 1851 – December 5, 1905) was a Native Hawaiian Colonel who was a monarchist and known for organizing the 1895 Wilcox rebellion against the Republic of Hawaii before being caught and arrested during the rebellion.

== Biography ==
=== Family ===
Nowlein was born on April 3, 1851, as the son of Michael James Nowlein who was of British origin and Akela Kaliko Kupanaha who was of Native Hawaiian origin. He would go on to marry Lucy Keakealani Ahying and had three children with her.

=== Role in the overthrow of the monarchy ===
Nowlein was a member of the Royal Guards of Hawaii with the oldest documented instance of his service being since 1885. Nowlein served as Captain of the Royal Guards of Hawaii and during his time there, Nowlein along with figures like Robert William Wilcox and Charles Burnett Wilson, planned to launch a coup to overthrow Kalākaua and replace him with Liliʻuokalani but the plot never came to fruition as it was accidentally discovered in January 1888. Despite this however, he remained as a member of the Royal Guards until the Overthrow of the Hawaiian Kingdom, in which, Nowlein raised a total of 496 soldiers to defend the Queen after negotiations had failed with Lorrin A. Thurston. Despite this however, the Monarchy was abolished anyways and the Provisional Government of Hawaii was established.

=== 1895 Wilcox Rebellion ===
In 1895, following the creation of the Republic of Hawaii, Nowlein was involved in another plot with Wilcox and when the rebellion began, Nowlein played a prominent role in the Battle of Mōʻiliʻili and while the battle initially went well, when the government brought out a Howitzer, 33 of Nowlein's men surrendered and Nowlein and a few others managed to escape, leaving the rest of his men to their own fates however Nowlein was found and arrested on January 14 with three lieutenants with a sentence of five years in prison however Sanford B. Dole pardoned Nowlein and the rest of the royalists after they served part of their sentence.
