= Reform Party (Hawaii) =

Reform Party ʻAoʻao Hoʻoponopono Hou
- Leaders: Lorrin A. Thurston; Sanford B. Dole
- Founded: 1840
- Dissolved: 1902
- Merged into: Hawaii Republican Party
- Headquarters: Honolulu
- Ideology: Americanization; Annexationism; Republicanism; American republicanism
- Religion: Protestantism
- National affiliation: Republican Party (United States) (after 1898)
- International affiliation: Republican Party (United States) (before 1898)

The Reform Party, also referred to as "the Missionary Party", or the "Down-Town Party", was a political party in the Kingdom of Hawaii. It was founded by descendants of Protestant missionaries that came to Hawaii from New England. Following the Annexation of Hawaii in 1898, and the creation of the Hawaii Territory in 1900, the party was largely supplanted by the Hawaii Republican Party. In 1902, The Reform Party ceased to exist and completely merged into the Republican Party. In 1912, the Republicans merged with the pro-Native Hawaiian Home Rule Party (which had been formed in 1900, following the organization of the Hawaii Territory with the Organic Act, and led by Prince Kuhio and Robert Wilcox) to form the Hawaii Republican Party in its modern composition. The fused Republican Party would lead the so-called "Haole-Hawaiian Alliance," with uninterrupted Legislative majorities until Democrats took control of the Legislature in 1954.

== Background ==
In 1820 the first Protestant missionaries arrived in Hawaii, sent a year earlier by the American Board of Commissioners for Foreign Missions. Led by Hiram Bingham, the board organized missionaries in 1819 to travel to Hawaii aboard the Thaddeus. Bingham and the missionaries were appalled by the Native Hawaiians lack of clothing and believed them to be less than human. Kamehameha II was cautious and allowed only half the party to settle in Honolulu and the other half to remain close to him on the big island. Eventually the monarch allowed a trial period of one year for the missionaries to remain in the islands. The missionaries urged Hawaiian rulers to adopt Protestantism. The ali'i were suspicious of the missionaries at first but slowly began to trust them. The missionaries advised the monarchs on everything from politics to social ethics from their Puritan perspective.

After the death of Kamehameha, Queen Ka'ahumanu came to power under Liholiho. As a Protestant, she banned some practice of the old Hawaiian religion (like the hula) in the islands, but were reestablish by her successors. A later ban on Catholicism would lead to repercussions with France when French Catholic missionaries were deported.

== Origins ==
=== "Missionary party" ===
The families of several missionaries became wealthy and their descendants were able to launch businesses and establish plantations in the islands. According to "The Friend" (Honolulu publication) from the turn of the twentieth century, there were 91 sons and 73 daughters of missionaries with 101 grandsons and 73 granddaughters living in Hawaii. This was an estimated 1/20 of the white population of Hawaii at the time (a figure that excluded the Portuguese population). It was common to refer to the entire white population as "the missionary party" and it was a common belief that they ruled the islands having leading positions in society. The missionary publication The Missionary Review of the World (1900) states; "They form the best element of the population of Hawaii". The missionary party was heavily involved in land and labor issues but were not able to gain control over government foreign affairs. Most of them were U.S. citizens that were already in constant communications with the US as well as continuous trading. They controlled all aspects of media, business and politics in Hawaii. After teaming up with the U.S. Republican Party and the U.S. Navy there was little left to exploit. A propaganda campaign followed to convince Hawaiians that the U.S. was the legitimate ruler and that they were, in fact, Americans, according to Dallas Carter.

=== Land, labor, sugar and suffrage ===
Descendants of missionaries began to prosper. "The missionaries came to do good and stayed to do well" is an old adage used in Hawaii. Amos Cooke is one of many missionaries that did well under Kamehameha III. Cooke came to Hawaii from Danbury, Connecticut in 1837 and ran the Royal School to educate the future rulers of the islands. In 1843 Cooke took a position as an unofficial advisor to the king's special board, against the rules of the Board of Missionaries that prevented members from serving in political positions. The first thing he did was to attain title to valuable Hawaiian land. In his book "Overthrow", author and journalist Stephen Kinzer states; "Buying it was complicated since Native Hawaiians had little notion of private property or cash exchange. They had great difficulty understanding how a transaction - or anything else for that matter - could deprive them of land". Cooke was able to help convince Kamehameha III to institute extraordinary land reform, opening up the purchase of as much land as one could buy.

In 1875, the Reciprocity Treaty with the U.S. was forced through and removed all tariffs from cane sugar from Hawaii and contained a provision allowing the U.S. exclusive rights to maintain military bases in the islands. Protests by Native Hawaiians erupted immediately, taking eight days and 220 armed soldiers to put down. The protest were violent and the monarch had to request American assistance. 150 marines were landed to protect the government. The exportation of sugar flowed for decades creating immense wealth that also came with both economic and political power. Nearly all government positions became almost exclusively white.

Along with another missionary named Samuel Northrup Castle, Cooke would form the Castle & Cooke company which would become the world's largest sugar producer and one of the "Big Five" that controlled politics in Hawaii for almost a hundred years. They were also the largest landowners in Hawaii. But with plantations came a need for labor. To the white plantation owners, Hawaiians made for poor labor so contract laborers were brought in from China and Japan. This created a demographics challenge to the white missionary leaders. They were outnumbered by the Hawaiian, Japanese and Chinese populations. Tight restrictions on democracy in Hawaii had to be instituted by Americans in order to maintain minority control. Suffrage for even just men would bring to power a non-white government.
