= Newlands Resolution =

Resolution for US annexation of Hawaii, 1898

- Long title: Joint Resolution to Provide for Annexing the Hawaiian Islands to the United States (1898)
- Enacted by: the 55th United States Congress
- Effective: July 7, 1898

Citations
- Statutes at Large: 30 Stat. 750

Legislative history
- Introduced in the House as H.J.Res. 259 by Francis G. Newlands (S-NV); Passed the House on June 15, 1898 (209-91); Passed the Senate on July 6, 1898 (42-21); Signed into law by President William McKinley on July 7, 1898

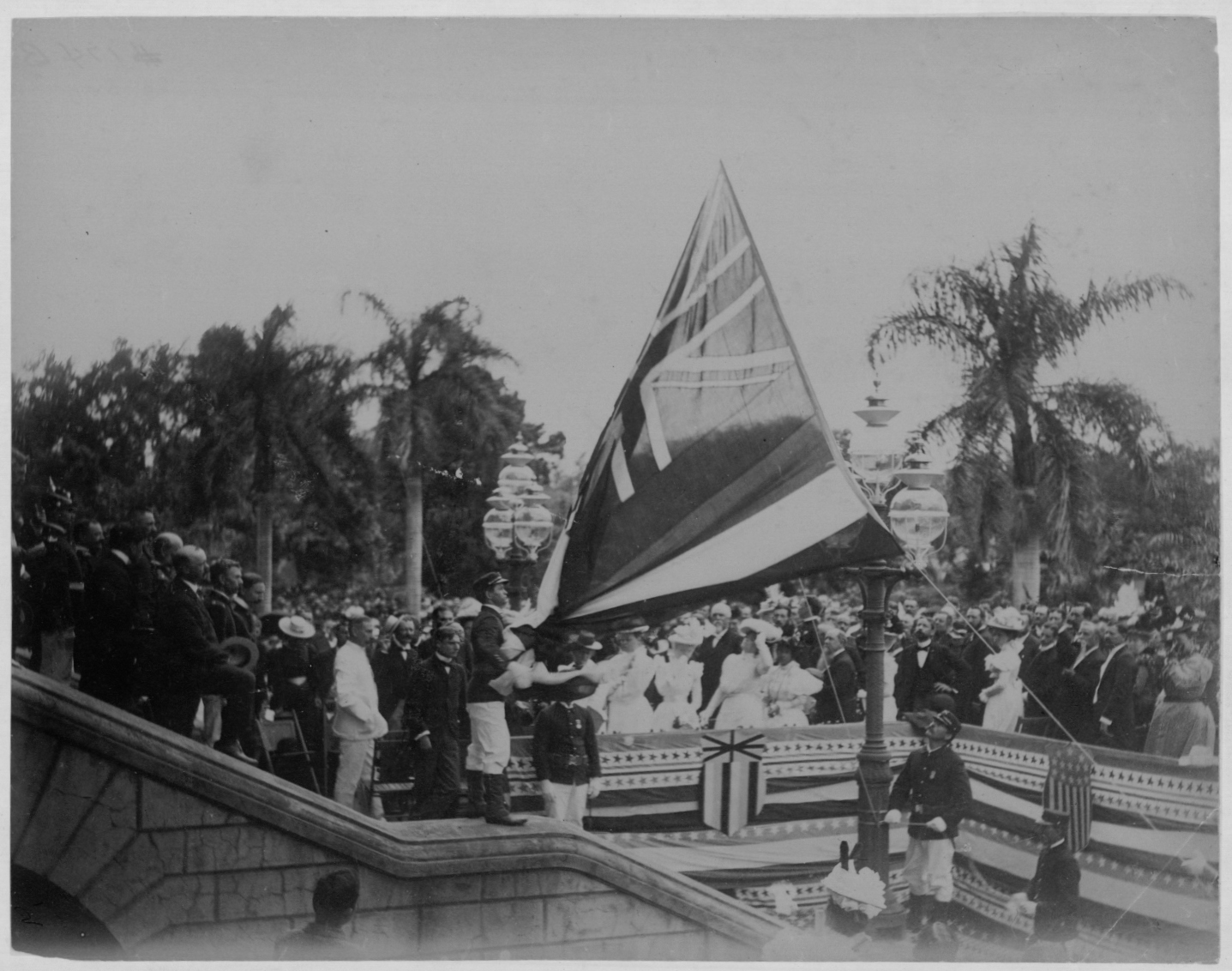
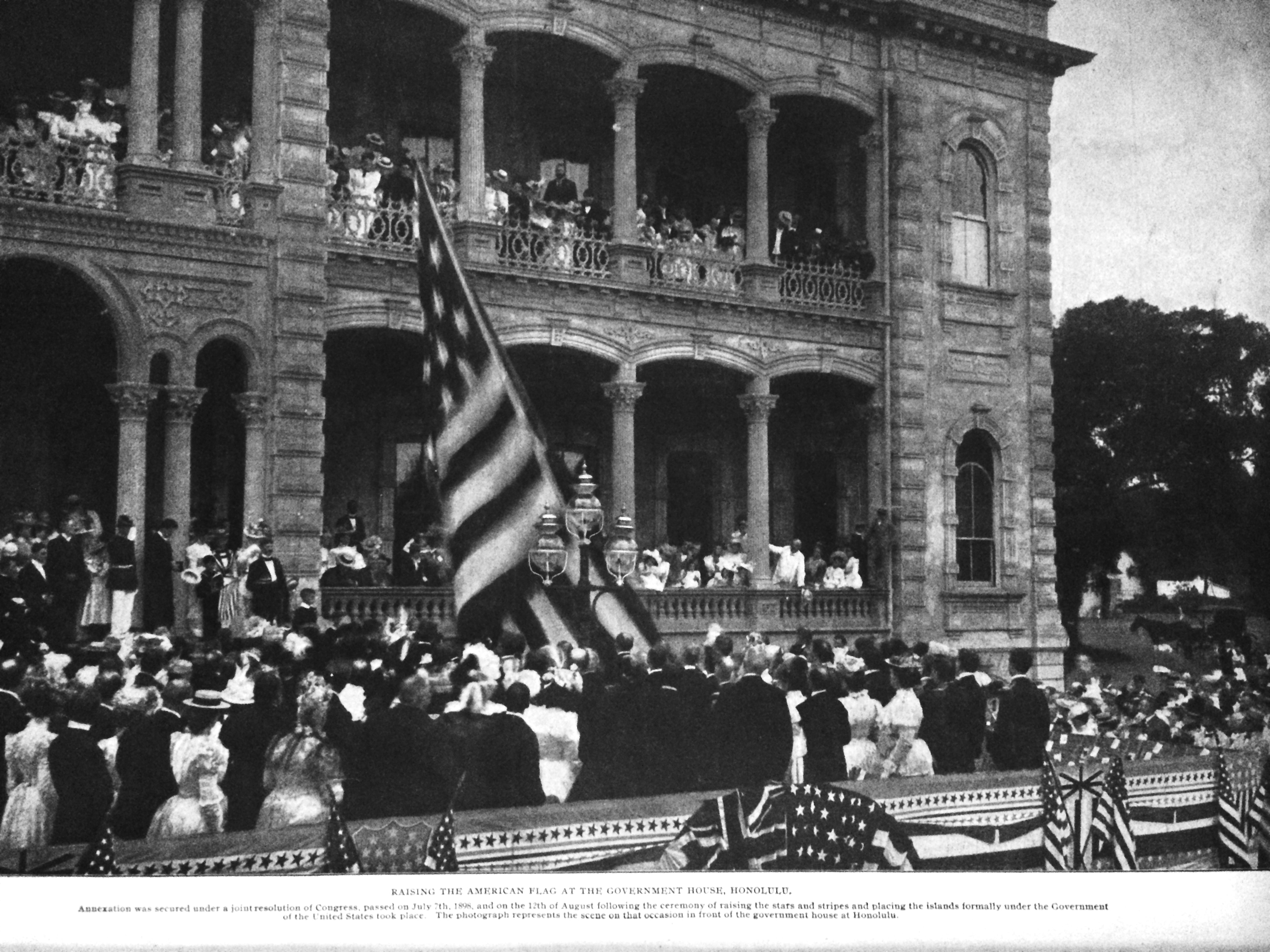
On August 23, 1898, the flag of Hawaii over Iolani Palace was lowered and the United States flag raised to signify annexation.

The Newlands Resolution, 30 Stat. 750, was a joint resolution passed on July 7, 1898, by the United States Congress to annex the independent Republic of Hawaii, for the purpose of colonizing the island. In 1900, Congress created the Territory of Hawaii.

The resolution was drafted by Representative Francis G. Newlands of Nevada, a member of the Silver Party. Annexation was a highly controversial political issue, along with the similar issue of the acquisition of the Philippines in 1898.

== Passage ==
In 1897, US President William McKinley signed a treaty of annexation for the Republic of Hawaii which lacked two-thirds support in the Senate, and thus never went into effect. In April 1898, the US went to war with Spain. The Republic of Hawaii decided not to support the war effort and declared its neutrality. However, according to Ralph S. Kuykendall, "The Hawaiian government threw aside its neutrality and did all it could to aid the Americans....Honolulu became a mid-ocean stopover for the United States troops that were sent across the Pacific to follow up Dewey's victory. The American soldiers were enthusiastically welcomed and given a taste of Hawaiian hospitality." This demonstrated Hawaii's value as a naval base in wartime, and the American colony on Hawaii won widespread American approval for its help. With the opposition weakened by this strategic importance, Hawaii was annexed through the Newlands Resolution, a joint resolution of Congress with executive assent, which required only a majority vote in both houses. Most of the bill's support came from Republicans. It passed the house by a vote of 209 to 91, with 182 of the votes in favor from Republicans. In the event, it passed the Senate by 42–21, with exactly two-thirds in favor. It was approved on July 6, 1898, and signed on July 7 by President McKinley. Queen Liliʻuokalani sent a letter of protest to the US House of Representatives in attempt to return control of her homeland to native Hawaiians, stating her throne had been taken illegally. On August 12, 1898, a ceremony was held on the steps of ʻIolani Palace to signify the official transfer of Hawaiian state sovereignty to the US. None of the former Hawaiian leadership attended.

This account illustrates the popular response to the ceremony: "An event of this magnitude would ordinarily call for gala celebrations that night. However, there were no celebrations as there was too much sadness, too much bitterness and resentment prevalent in the atmosphere and the authorities were afraid of riots by the unhappy frustrated Hawaiians."

The resolution established a five-member commission to study the laws that were needed in Hawaii. The commission included Territorial Governor Sanford B. Dole (R-Hawaii Territory), Senators Shelby M. Cullom (R-IL) and John T. Morgan (D-AL), Representative Robert R. Hitt (R-IL) and former Hawaii Chief Justice and later Territorial Governor Walter F. Frear (R-Hawaii Territory). The commission's final report was submitted to Congress, resulting in a debate that lasted over a year. Congress raised objections that establishing an elected territorial government in Hawaii would lead to the admission of a state with a non-white majority. Annexation allowed duty-free trade between the islands and the mainland, although this had mostly already been accomplished through a reciprocity trade agreement King David Kalakaua had made with the US in 1875, which had also given the US Navy a long term lease of Pearl Harbor as a naval base.

The creation of the Territory of Hawaii was the final step in a long history of dwindling Hawaiian sovereignty, and divided the local population. The annexation was opposed among the Polynesian population, and occurred without a referendum of any kind. Between September 11 and October 2, 1897, the Hui Aloha 'Aina and Hui Kulai'aina groups organised a mass petition drive that obtained 21,269 signatures on the "Petition Against Annexation"—more than half of the 39,000 native Hawaiians. The Hawaiian sovereignty movement still disputes the legality of the acquisition of Hawaii under the United States Constitution. However, the US Supreme Court gave tacit recognition to the legitimacy of Hawaii's annexation in DeLima v. Bidwell, 182 U.S. 1, 196 (1901). The legality of the Newlands Resolution has also been recognized by the Ninth Circuit Court of Appeals in Arakaki v. Lingle, 477 F.3d 1048 (2007)(recognizing that "the Newlands Resolution, provided that the Republic of Hawaii ceded all public lands to the United States").

== Cost ==
The US assumed $4 million in Hawaiian debt as part of the annexation. David R. Barker of the University of Iowa stated in 2009 that unlike the Alaska Purchase, Hawaii has been profitable for the country, with net tax revenue almost always exceeding non-defense spending. He estimated an internal rate of return for the annexation of more than 15%.

== Popular controversy ==
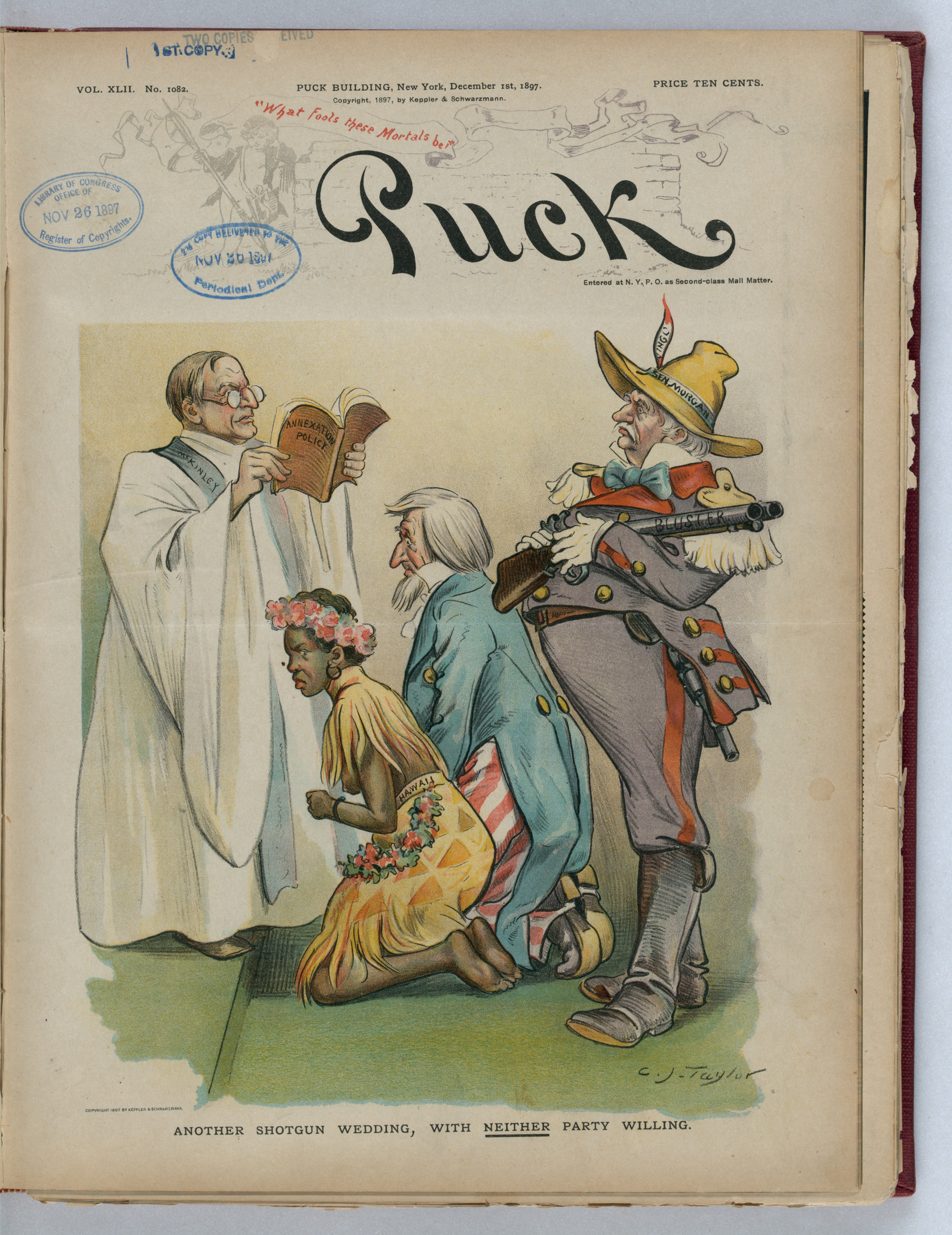
This 1897 political cartoon portrays the U.S. annexation of Hawaii as "Another shotgun wedding, with neither party willing".

Multiple viewpoints in the US and in Hawaii were raised for and against annexation from 1893 to 1898. Historian Henry Graff wrote that at first, "Public opinion at home seemed to indicate acquiescence.... Unmistakably, the sentiment at home was maturing with immense force for the United States to join the great powers of the world in a quest for overseas colonies."

President Grover Cleveland, on taking office in March 1893, rescinded the annexation proposal. His biographer Alyn Brodsky argued that it was a deeply personal conviction on Cleveland's part against immoral action against the little kingdom:

Just as he stood up for the Samoan Islands against Germany because he opposed the conquest of a lesser state by a greater one, so did he stand up for the Hawaiian Islands against his own nation. He could have let the annexation of Hawaii move inexorably to its inevitable culmination. But he opted for confrontation, which he hated, as it was to him the only way a weak and defenseless people might retain their independence. It was not the idea of annexation that Grover Cleveland opposed, but the idea of annexation as a pretext for illicit territorial acquisition.

Cleveland had to mobilize support from Southern Democrats to fight the treaty. He sent former Georgia Representative James H. Blount as a special representative to Hawaii to investigate and to provide a solution. Blount was well known for his opposition to imperialism. Blount was also a leading advocate for white supremacy, which effectively ended the right to vote for southern Blacks in the 1890s. Some observers had speculated that he would support annexation on the grounds of the inability of Asiatics to govern themselves. Instead, Blount opposed imperialism, called for the US military to restore Queen Liliuokalani, and argued that the Hawaii natives should be allowed to continue their "Asiatic ways".

Blount seemingly was unaware of the written policy set for Hawaii in Cleveland's first term by his Secretary of State Thomas F. Bayard for Hawaii. Bayard sent written instructions to the American minister George W. Merrill that in the event of another revolution in Hawaii, it was a priority to protect American commerce, lives, and property. Bayard specified that "the assistance of the officers of our Government vessels, if found necessary, will therefore be promptly afforded to promote the reign of law and respect for orderly government in Hawaii." In July 1889, during a small-scale rebellion, Merrill landed Marines to protect Americans, an action that the State Department explicitly approved. Stevens had read those 1887 instructions and followed them in 1893.

A vigorous nationwide anti-expansionist movement, organized as the American Anti-Imperialist League, emerged. Prominent anti-imperialists included Carl Schurz, Democratic leader William Jennings Bryan, industrialist Andrew Carnegie, author Mark Twain, sociologist William Graham Sumner, and many prominent intellectuals and politicians who came of age during the Civil War. The anti-imperialists opposed territorial expansion, believing that imperialism violated the fundamental principle that just, republican government derives from "consent of the governed". The League argued that such activity would necessitate the abandonment of American ideals of self-government and non-intervention that were expressed in the Declaration of Independence, George Washington's Farewell Address, and Lincoln's Gettysburg Address.

However, they could not stop the even more energetic forces of imperialism, which were led by Secretary of State John Hay, naval strategist Alfred T. Mahan, Republican Senator Henry Cabot Lodge, Secretary of War Elihu Root, and the young politician Theodore Roosevelt. Those expansionists had vigorous support from newspaper publishers William Randolph Hearst and Joseph Pulitzer, who whipped up popular excitement. There was deep concern that Japan would force Hawaii into its colonial empire, which was believed to pose a serious threat to the West Coast. Mahan and Roosevelt designed a global strategy calling for a competitive modern navy, Pacific bases, an isthmian canal through Nicaragua or Panama, and (above all) an assertive role for the United States as the largest industrial power. McKinley's position was that Hawaii could never survive on its own but would quickly be gobbled up by Japan, as about a quarter of the islands' population was already ethnically Japanese, and that this would allow Japan to dominate the Pacific and undermine American hopes for large-scale trade with Asia.

== See also ==
- Hawaiian Organic Act, approved in 1900 by Congress to adopt a form of government for the new territory, in supplement of the Newlands Resolution.
