= Chun Lung =

Chinese businessman

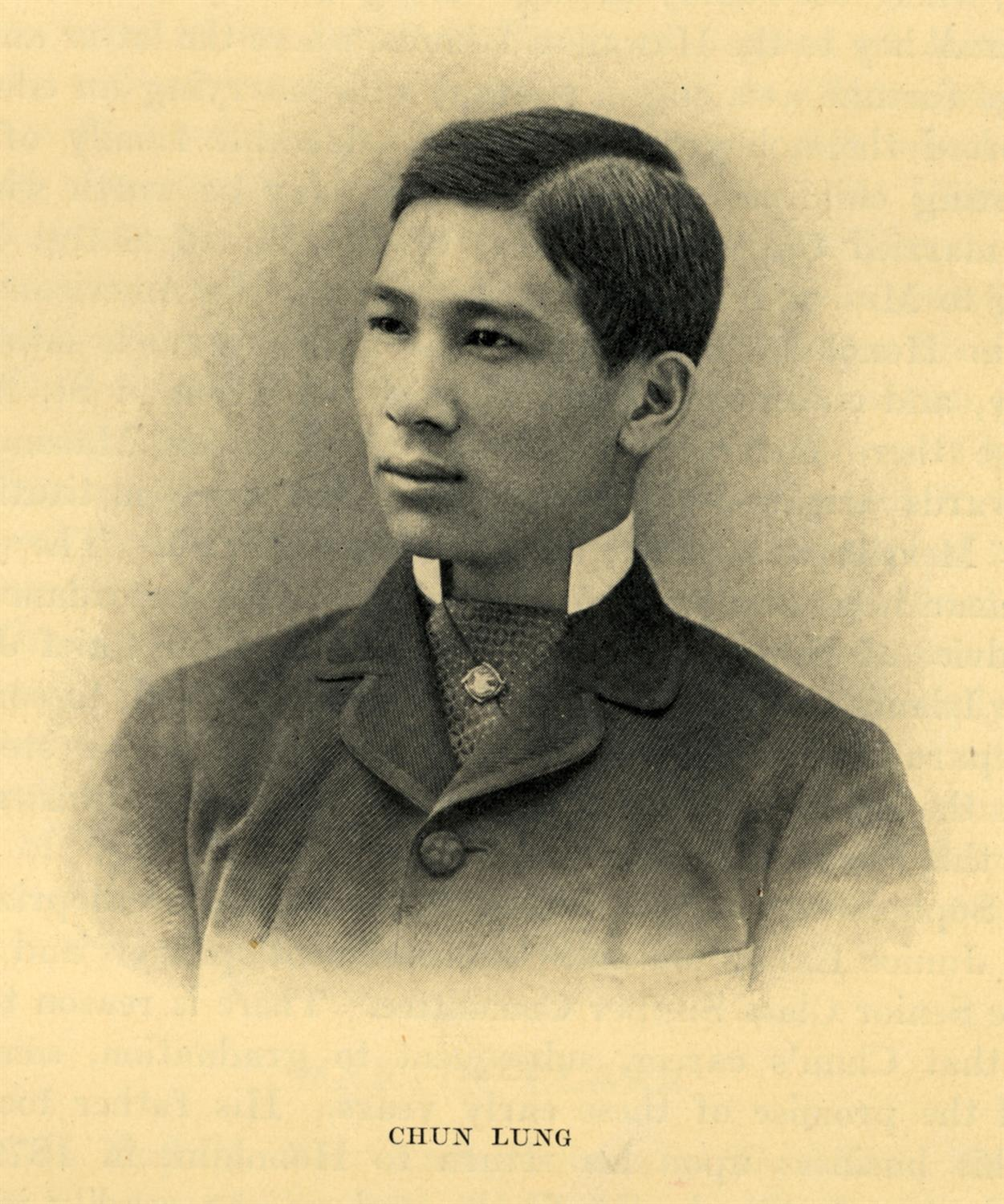
- Chun Lung at Yale University, 1879
- Born: c. 1852; Guangdong
- Died: August 11, 1889 (aged 37); Honolulu, Oahu, Hawaiian Kingdom
- Education: Yale University
- Occupation: Businessman
- Spouse: Ung See Soy
- Children: 3

Chinese name
- Traditional Chinese: 陳龍
- Simplified Chinese: 陈龙
Transcriptions
Standard Mandarin
- Hanyu Pinyin: Chén Lóng
Yue: Cantonese
- Jyutping: Can4 Long4

Chun Lung (Chinese: 陳龍; pinyin: Chén Long; c. 1852 – August 11, 1889) was a Chinese businessman in the Hawaiian Kingdom. He sometimes used his father's Hawaiianized surname and was known as C. L. Afong. He was also known as Alung or Ah Lung using the common Cantonese diminutive prefix Ah (阿) before his given name.

== Early life ==
Alung was born in about 1852, in the village of Kai Sheong-san, Zhuhai, Guangdong. He was the eldest son of Chun Afong and his primary kit-fat wife (结发妻), Lee Hong. His father resided in Honolulu where he became the first Chinese millionaire in Hawaii and traveled intermittently between the islands and China. Alung had two full brothers and sixteen half-siblings from his father's second marriage to Julia Fayerweather Afong, a British-Hawaiian woman of aliʻi (noble) descent.

His father Chun Afong and half-brother Toney (Chun Chik-yu) returned to China in June 1862. Chun Afong left his Hawaiian-born son to live with Lee Hong and his family in Meixi and took Alung back to Hawaii to raise in each other's respective culture for the next seven years. Afong returned to China in 1869 with Alung to retrieve Toney.

== Education ==
Back in Honolulu, Alung was instructed in the English language by either Anglican missionary Rev. Edmund Ibbotson or Charles William Turner at ʻIolani School (called St. Alban's College). He later studied at Oahu College.

Both brothers were prepared for college at Hartford Public High School in Connecticut. (Note: Toney was also said to have enrolled in either Trinity College, Yale or Harvard University, although there are no known records of his attendance in either of these institutions. According to historian Bob Dole, "Yale University has Chun Lung’s records, but I have yet to document that Toney went to Harvard. I am relying here on what some descendants were told. Also, Toney is thought by some descendants to have attended Trinity (Hartford) or Yale, but neither college has a record of his attendance.") Alung later enrolled in Yale University under the tutelage of Yung Wing. He was part of the class of 1879. During his junior year at Yale, Alung won an oratory prize with his essay titled "The Educational Element in Chinese Civilization".

== Career ==
After graduating from Yale, he was employed at the Chinese Legation at Washington, D.C., as an interpreter. In 1886–87, he was appointed as Special Commissioner by the Qing Dynasty government to inquire into the Coolie trade in Peru. He was awarded a tract of land and the decoration of the "White Button" by the Guangxu Emperor.

Around 1884, Alung returned to Hawaii to help his father manage his Hawaiian business interests. In 1886–87, he was involved in the so-called Aki opium scandal, an infamous bribery scandal involving King Kalākaua and his subordinate Junius Kaʻae who promised a government license to sell opium to Chinese businessman Tong Kee (Aki) after a bribe of $75,000. Despite the bribe, Alung was awarded the license and Aki demanded the return of the money. When the king refused Aki brought a lawsuit against the king.

Alung became seriously ill while on a business trip between Honolulu and the Pepeekeo Plantation on the island of Hawaii. Although given medical treatment on Maui, he died on August 11, 1889, of peritonitis, after he returned to Honolulu.

Alung married Ung See Soy and had three children: Chan Mui-Ngan, Chan Wing-On and an unnamed child.

== See also ==
- Chinese immigration to Hawaii

== Bibliography ==
- Dye, Bob (1997). Merchant Prince of the Sandalwood Mountains: Afong and the Chinese in Hawaiʻi. Honolulu: University of Hawaii Press. ISBN 978-0-8248-1772-5. OCLC 247424976.
- Dye, Robert Paul (2010). "Merchant Prince: Chun Afong in Hawaiʻi, 1849–90" (PDF). Chinese America: History & Perspectives. 15. San Francisco: Chinese Historical Society of America with UCLA Asian American Studies Center: 23–36. OCLC 818922702.
- Kuykendall, Ralph Simpson (1967). The Hawaiian Kingdom 1874–1893, The Kalakaua Dynasty. Vol. 3. Honolulu: University of Hawaii Press. ISBN 978-0-87022-433-1. OCLC 500374815.
- Lam, Margaret M. (1932). Six Generations of Race Mixture in Hawaii. Honolulu: University of Hawaii, Sociology MA Thesis. OCLC 16325277.
- Proctor, Mortimer Robinson, ed. (1912). History of the Class of 1912, Yale College. New Haven: Yale University.
- Spaulding, Thomas M. (July 22, 1939). Wilfred B. Shaw and Walter A. Donnelly (ed.). The Grand Duke of Gynbergdrinkenstein. Vol. XLV. Ann Arbor: The Alumni Association of the University of Michigan. pp. 299–305. OCLC 1771843. UOM:39015006955929.
- Teng, Emma Jinhua (2013). Eurasian: Mixed Identities in the United States, China, and Hong Kong, 1842–1943. Berkeley: University of California Press. ISBN 978-0-520-95700-8. OCLC 854611998.
- Williams, F. W. (1906). A History of the Class of Seventy-Nine. New Haven: Yale University. OCLC 235924119.
