= Junius Kaʻae =

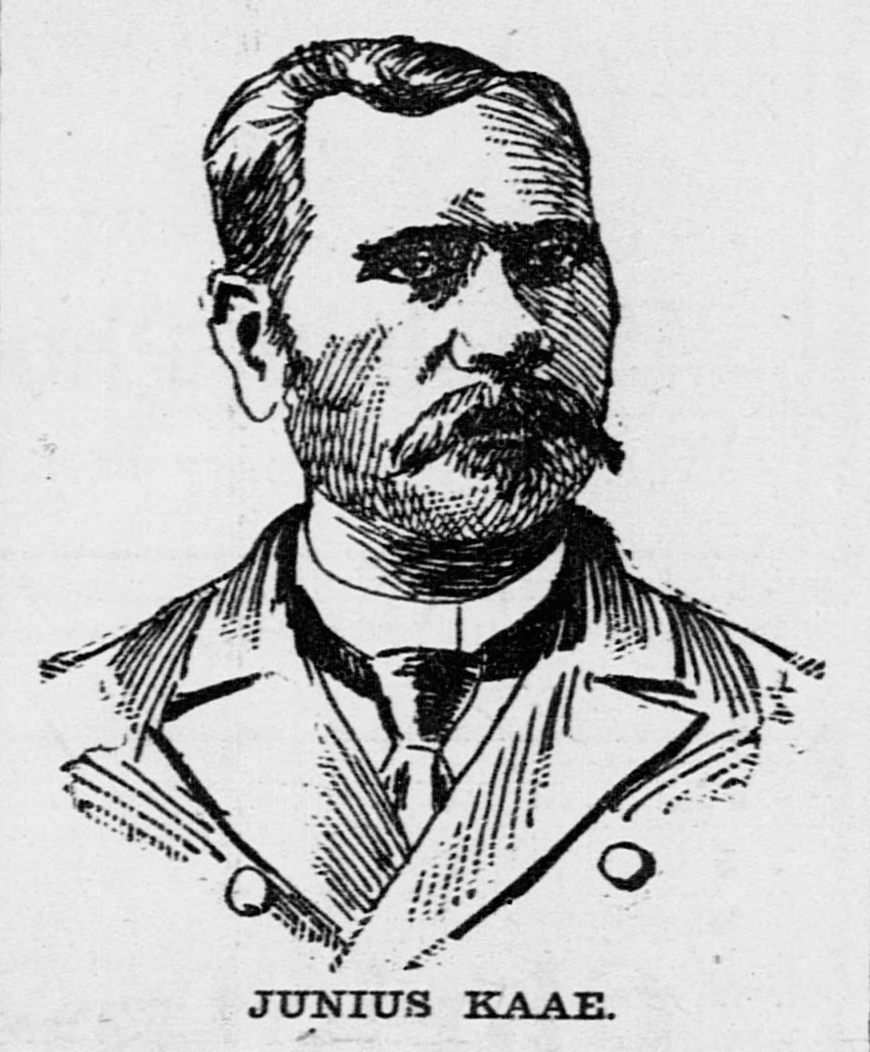

Member of the Kingdom of Hawaii House of Nobles
- In office 1882–1886
- Monarch: Kalākaua

Registrar of Conveyances
- In office October 30, 1886 – July 13, 1887
- Preceded by: Thomas Brown
- Succeeded by: Jonathan Austin

Personal details
- Born: September 17, 1845 Kaineha, Lahaina, Maui, Kingdom of Hawaii
- Died: December 19, 1906 (aged 61) Honolulu, Oahu, Territory of Hawaii
- Resting place: Kawaiahaʻo Church
- Party: Hawaiian National
- Spouse(s): Kukakina; Kamehaokalani; Jessie Kapaihi Lane

Junius Kaʻae (September 17, 1845 – December 19, 1906) was a Native Hawaiian politician of the Kingdom of Hawaii. In 1887, he was implicated in the infamous bribery scandal involving King Kalākaua over the sale of an opium license to Tong Kee.

== Life and career ==
Kaʻae served many positions during the Hawaiian monarchy. He worked as a notary public and agent of labor contract for the island of Kauai, receiving his first appointment on December 13, 1877, and a later reappointment on January 13, 1879. On April 29, 1882, he was appointed by King Kalākaua as a member of the House of Nobles, the upper house of the Legislature of the Kingdom of Hawaii. He served from 1882 to 1886 until the 1887 Bayonet Constitution removed all appointed nobles and made both legislative chambers elective. Around this time, he also served as Registrar of Conveyances from October 30, 1886, to July 13, 1887, and a member of the Hawaiian Board of Health on February 16, 1887. The latter was a brief governmental organization in charged of licensing kahuna or practitioners of traditional Hawaiian medicine.

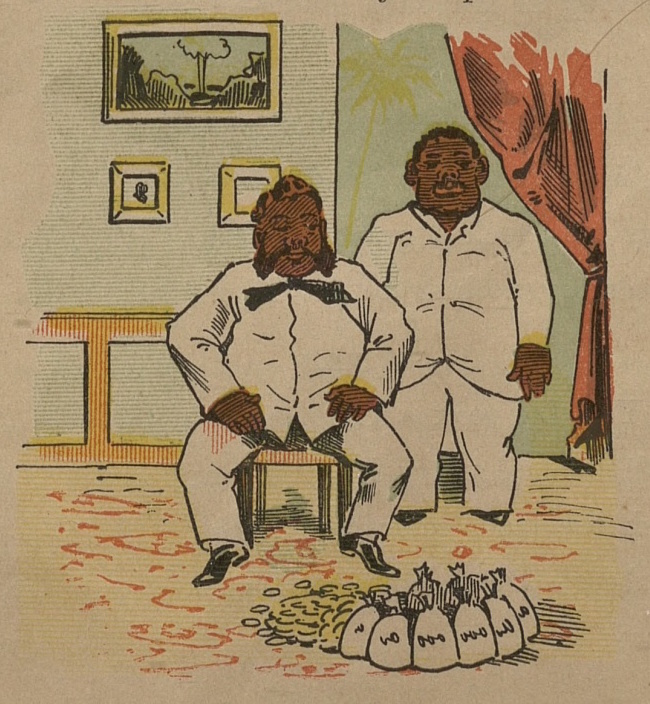
The Gynberg Duke and Kiyi, from the Gynberg Ballads, 1887

In the capacity of Registrar of Conveyance, Kaʻae was implicated in a corruption charge leveled on the king by his opponents. It was reported that Kaʻae had convinced a Chinese rice planter named Tong Kee, alias Aki, to make a bribe of $75,000 (of which only $71,000 was actually paid) to the king, in order to secure the grant of an opium sales license. It was rumored that the large sum of cash was smuggled into the palace in baskets and handed to Kaʻae. When the license was awarded to Chun Lung, another Chinese immigrant, Aki demanded the money back and when the money was not returned he outed the king and Kaʻae in twelve affidavits detailing the controversy.

The opium bribery scandal was satirized in the political satirical pamphlet, the Gynberg Ballads published by Alatau T. Atkinson, editor of the Hawaiian Gazette, and possibly coauthored by Edward William Purvis, a former member of the king's military staff. Shipments of the ballads arrived from San Francisco on May 13, 1887, and was distributed widely despite attempts by the government to seize the printed pamphlets. One of the parts titled "The Opium Racket" summarized the scandal although changing the names of the participants. Aki became "You Lie", the king was transformed into the "Gynberg Duke" and Kaʻae became "Kiyi". This became one of the corruption charges which led to the coup of the king by the Reform Party and the signing of the 1887 Bayonet Constitution which restricted his executive power. Kaʻae was forced to resign.

He was later appointed to the Privy Council of State, the advisory council for the monarch, on December 14, 1886, by King Kalākaua, and continued in this role even after the opium license controversy. The king died in 1891 and was succeeded by his sister Liliʻuokalani. After her accession to the throne, the new queen reappointed Kaʻae to her Privy Council on March 7, 1891. Records of the Privy Council indicate that he only served one year before ceasing to sit in this body in 1892.

== Personal life ==
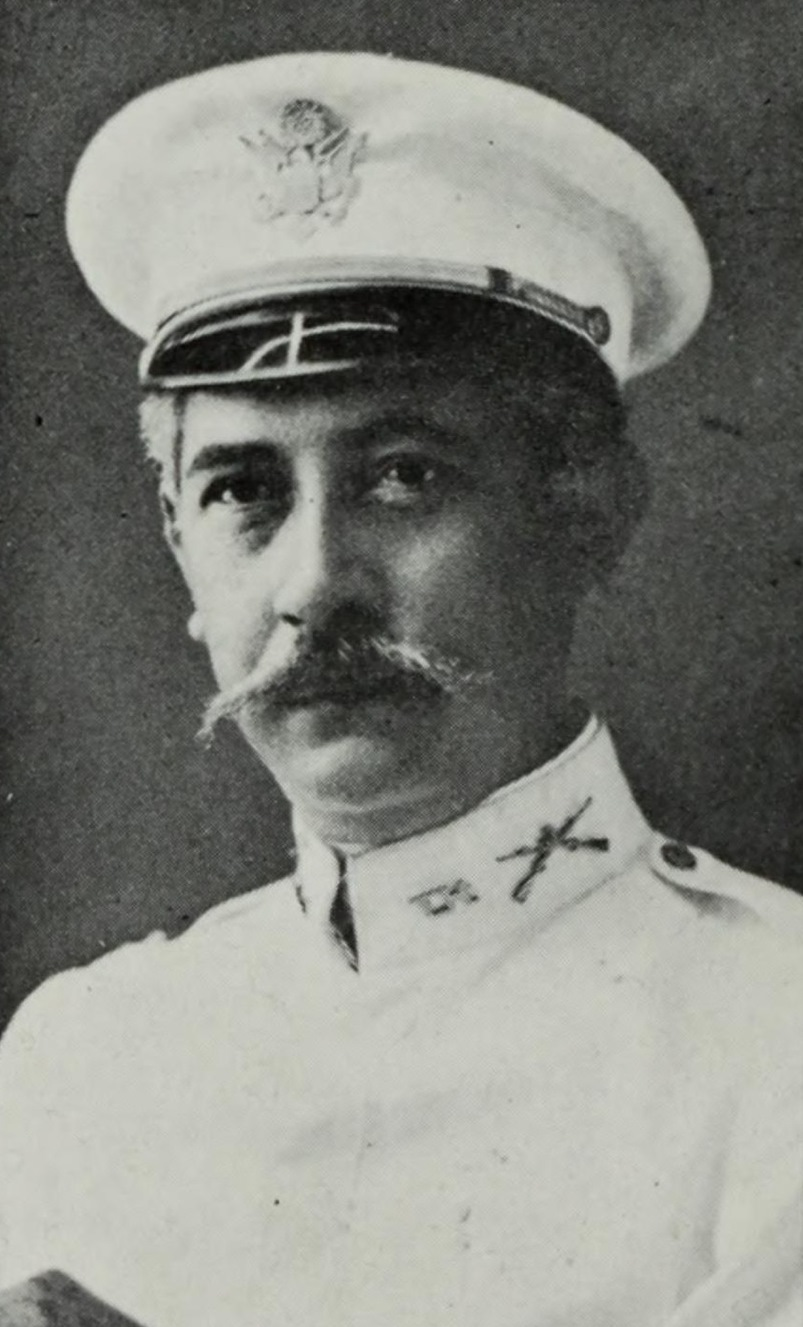
Son William F. Kaʻae

He married three times. With his first wife Kukakina, he had a son named William F. Kaʻae (1870–1938), who became a county official for the Territory of Hawaii. His second wife was Kamehaokalani, a relative of Queen Kapiʻolani, and they had three children. His third wife Jessie Kapaihi Lane (1857–1934), sister of Honolulu Mayor John C. Lane, survived him.

In later life, Kaʻae attempted to claim, on behalf of his deceased second wife, the lands of Kealiʻiahonui, the son of the last independent king of Kauai Kaumualiʻi. His suit stating that the last will of Kealiʻiahonui was forged was rejected by the courts. In 1893, almost immediately following the overthrow of the Kingdom of Hawaii, the Kaae petition was accepted and the probate of Kealiʻiahonui was reversed by the provisional government as the first case heard by Dole after the overthrow. Kaʻae died of blood poisoning at Queen's Hospital in Honolulu. His funeral was held at the Cathedral Basilica of Our Lady of Peace and he was buried at the Kawaiahaʻo Church cemetery.

== Bibliography ==
- Hawaii (1918). Lydecker, Robert Colfax (ed.). Roster Legislatures of Hawaii, 1841–1918. Honolulu: Hawaiian Gazette Company. OCLC 60737418.
- Karpiel, Frank (1999). "Notes & Queries – The Hale Naua Society". The Hawaiian Journal of History. 33. Honolulu: Hawaiian Historical Society: 203–212. hdl:10524/509. OCLC 60626541.
- Kuykendall, Ralph Simpson (1967). The Hawaiian Kingdom 1874–1893, The Kalakaua Dynasty. Vol. 3. Honolulu: University of Hawaii Press. ISBN 978-0-87022-433-1. OCLC 500374815.
- Osorio, Jon Kamakawiwoʻole (2002). Dismembering Lāhui: A History of the Hawaiian Nation to 1887. Honolulu: University of Hawaii Press. ISBN 0-8248-2549-7. OCLC 48579247.
- Spaulding, Thomas M. (July 22, 1939). Wilfred B. Shaw and Walter A. Donnelly (ed.). The Grand Duke of Gynbergdrinkenstein. Vol. XLV. Ann Arbor: The Alumni Association of the University of Michigan. pp. 299–305. OCLC 1771843. UOM:39015006955929.
