= The Money Dragon =

- Author: Pam Chun
- Language: English
- Genre: Historical fiction
- Publication date: March 1, 2001
- ISBN: 1-57071-866-0

The Money Dragon is an American historical fiction novel, written by Pam Chun in 2001. It tells the story of a Chinese immigrant to the Kingdom of Hawai'i, Lau Ah Leong, through the eyes of his daughter-in-law.

== Book structure ==
The Money Dragon opens with a foreword by former U.S. Senator Hiram Fong. Also included in the book before the story is a family tree. After the story there is a glossary and images of several historic documents and photos, including Lau Ah Leong's immigration form and obituary.

== Plot introduction ==
Phoenix, a Chinese girl, comes to the Kingdom of Hawaii in 1918 to marry Lau Tat-Tung, first son of Lau Ah Leong. Lau Ah Leong is a very prosperous merchant in Hawaii. Despite Phoenix's dreams of a good life as a rich merchant's wife, she soon learns that reality is not so golden—Lau Ah Leong has many conniving wives who control the family. While she fights to provide her children with a good life in this environment she learns more about Lau Ah Leong, who is the focus of the book.

== Plot summary ==
Phoenix first heard of Lau Ah Leong when she was eight, never suspecting then that she would become his daughter-in-law. Ten years later, after the death of her father, L. Ah Leong's first son, Lau Tat-Tung, then aged 30, is suggested as a good match for her. Shortly afterward it is agreed that they should marry. Phoenix is excited and happy about the match.

They are married at Ming Yang Tong, L. Ah Leong's largest China estate, having 118 bedrooms. After the wedding they enjoy eight months at that estate, but are forced to move because the civil war in China is causing concern that Tat-Tung will be kidnapped by a faction desperate for money. Phoenix and Tat-Tung go to Hong Kong to find a boat to Hawaii.

Unfortunately many other people have the same idea. Three months later their first child (though not Tat-Tung's oldest—he has another by his late wife, and one adopted), Fung-Tai is born. She is another two weeks old before they manage to book passage to Hawaii.

When they finally reach Hawaii, it seems a beautiful paradise, filled with beautiful women, a cheerful band, and many garlands of colorful flowers. However, immigration officials claim that it will take three weeks to get Phoenix processed—a worry, since she has no more milk for their baby.

This was due to the Chinese Exclusion Act of 1882. Hawaii had become part of the United States, and because of this act Chinese had to have a special Hawaiian Islands identification card and witnesses living in Hawai'i to testify for them upon exit or entry. Sometimes even Hawai'i born Chinese with papers in order and witnesses could be denied entry or exit. However, soon L. Ah Leong comes to clear things up, and pays a bribe of $1350 to get Phoenix off the boat after only an afternoon of waiting. This is the first time Phoenix meets L. Ah Leong face to face.

L. Ah Leong began as a poor beggar in China, and through luck and hard work was noticed by his boss, Ahuna, who brings with him to open a plantation store in Hawaii. He also taught Ah Leong the art of coffee brewing and chose Ah Leong's first wife, Dai-Kam. Ah Leong starts a store in Kapa'au, which goes bankrupt.

After his bankruptcy, in 1884, Ah Leong is referred to L. Ah Low for a stock boy and store cook. Dai-Kam is Ah Low's family cook. The store is in Honolulu, and Ah Leong lives there through the Bayonet Constitution and a bloody attempt by Hawaiians to return the monarchy to power in 1889.

By 1891 Ah Leong's first son is born, and Ah Leong has become a full citizen of the Kingdom of Hawaii, one of only a few non-Hawaiians to do so.

He used the dowry money from his first wife to purchase a shop in Kaka'ako. At first the community doubted he would succeed, as Kaka'ako was a predominantly white community, and Chinese usually patronized Chinese shops. This was lucky, because Ah Leong's shop was not burned when Chinatown was burned down after bubonic plague was discovered there. However, trade was very slow for him because many people lost everything to the flames.

Ah Leong interpreted the fire, which burned everything so completely, as purifying the ground, and believed that it would cause him good fortune to build on this ground. Therefore, he opened a new store at 11 North King Street (where it can still be seen). His store soon became the busiest in Honolulu.

Along with a rise in status and wealth, Ah Leong married three new wives. Dai-Kam was very unhappy about this, but Ah Leong was a charming man, and would talk his way around her.

Ah Leong also used his wealth to build huge estates in his home area in China. Tat-Tung supervised construction.

After the series of events, the first wife finally decided to take her children and return to China. His third and fourth wives died. Ah Leong was taken into court and fined for cohabitating with too many wives, since none of them were legally married in the United States. The second wife became the only one living in the house, and went behind Ah Leong's back to get a marriage license—she was the only wife legally married to him.

Ah Leong married another woman, who stayed in China to manage his property there. Dai-Kam returned from China, and in her absence Ah Leong's businesses grew even more.

At this time Phoenix comes into the picture. After her arrival she is treated badly until she moves with her husband to a separate house. Tat-Tung is also harassed by his father, who claims that he is cheating him. This ends when Tat-Tung fights back by not coming to work.

Then one day Ah Leong cuts his foot while trying to clip his nails with a knife. He believes that it will heal itself, and waits too long to get medical attention. It becomes so infected that doctors say they must amputate, but Ah Leong believes that he must go to death whole, so he dies after refusing the amputation. Before his death he repents making his will such that his second wife's children will inherit.

After Lau Ah leong's death there is a lot of fighting over his money by the children of his second wife. At the time of his death in 1934, Ah Leong had amassed a fortune of approximately a million dollars. At first, Tat-Tung and his family are struggling because they no longer have as much money. However, one of his half-brothers eventually gets him a store to manage, and this assures Tat-Tung and Phoenix's future.
