= Tong Kee =

Tong Kee, also known as T. Aki, (died October 7, 1887) was a Chinese immigrant and businessman who settled in the Kingdom of Hawaii. In 1886–87, he was embroiled in the Aki opium scandal, (Note: Also called the Aki Case and the Opium Scandal by historian William DeWitt Alexander.), a bribery corruption scandal involving King Kalākaua and Junius Kaʻae reneging on a bribe Aki made to secure the sale of an opium license.

== Biography ==
Tong Kee, who became known as Aki in Hawaii, was a rice plantation and mill owner at Waiau, in the ʻEwa District, on the island of Oahu. Chinese names were often written using the given name with the prefix Ah (阿), so Ah Kee became Aki in Hawaii. Because of the orientation of Chinese names, Aki became his surname instead of his Chinese family name Tong.

In December 1886, Junius Kaʻae, who served as Registrar of Conveyances under King Kalākaua, convinced Aki to present multiple bribes totaling $75,000 (of which only $71,000 was actually paid) to the king in order to secure the grant of a license to import and sell opium in the islands. Through multiple trips, the large sums of cash were smuggled into ʻIolani Palace where they were received by Kaʻae and the king. When the license was awarded to Chun Lung, the son of Chinese millionaire businessman Chun Afong, Aki demanded the return of the money and, when the king refused, he brought a lawsuit against the king. Twelve affidavits (totaling sixty-four pages) were released by Aki and others associated with the case detailing the scandal. The king's defense later claimed that the gifts were free-will offerings from Aki and that the money was accepted reluctantly by the king.

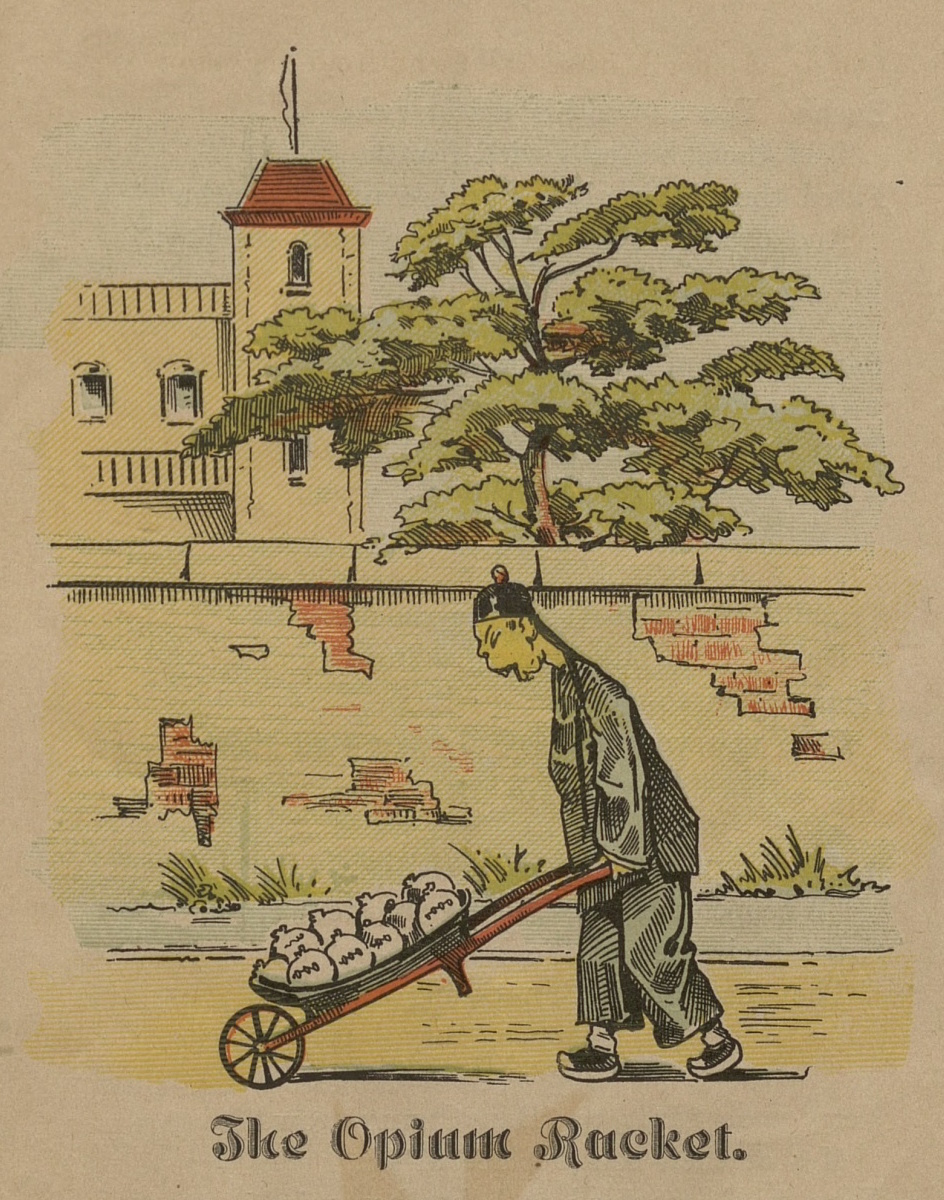
"The Opium Racket", from the Gynberg Ballads. An illustration on the ballad erroneously depicted Little You Lie wheeling a wheelbarrow full of bags of gold into the palace

The opium bribery scandal was satirized in the political satirical pamphlet, the Gynberg Ballads published by Alatau T. Atkinson, editor of the Hawaiian Gazette, and possibly co-authored by Edward William Purvis, a former member of the king's military staff. Shipments of the ballads arrived from San Francisco on May 13, 1887, and were distributed widely despite attempts by the government to seize the printed pamphlets. One of the pages titled "The Opium Racket" summarized the scandal although the names of the participants were changed. Aki became "You Lie", the king was transformed into the "Gynberg Duke" and Kaʻae became "Kiyi". This publication and the scandal would have a negative impact on the king's and his cabinet headed by Walter Murray Gibson and lead to increase anti-Chinese sentiments among the foreign white community.

Ultimately, this scandal became one of the corruption charges which led to the July 1887 coup of the king by his opponents and the forced signing of the 1887 Bayonet Constitution which restricted his executive power. Kaʻae was forced to resign. The new constitution also disenfranchised the naturalized Chinese residents of the kingdom and ushered in a race-based suffrage system which completely excluded Asians from voting or citizenship.

Aki died on October 7, 1887, before the case ended. Ultimately the court ruled that money given as a bribe cannot be returned in a civil suit and the Supreme Court of Hawaii ruled that the king also possessed legal immunity.

== See also ==
- Chinese immigration to Hawaii

== Bibliography ==
- Alexander, William DeWitt (1896). History of Later Years of the Hawaiian Monarchy and the Revolution of 1893. Honolulu: Hawaiian Gazette Company. OCLC 11843616.
- Char, Wai J.; Char, Tin-Uke (1988). Chinese Historic Sites and Pioneer Families of Rural Oahu. Honolulu: Hawaii Chinese History Center. ISBN 978-0-8248-1113-6. OCLC 17299656.
- Char, Wai-Jane (1974). "Chinese Merchant-Adventurers and Sugar Masters in Hawaii: 1802–1852: General Background". The Hawaiian Journal of History. 8. Honolulu: Hawaiian Historical Society: 3–10. hdl:10524/132. OCLC 60626541.
- Chou, Michaelyn P. (2010). "Ethnicity and Elections in Hawaiʻi: The Case of James K. Kealoha" (PDF). Chinese America: History & Perspectives. 15. San Francisco: Chinese Historical Society of America with UCLA Asian American Studies Center: 105–111.
- Dye, Bob (1997). Merchant Prince of the Sandalwood Mountains: Afong and the Chinese in Hawaiʻi. Honolulu: University of Hawaii Press. ISBN 978-0-8248-1772-5.
- Kuykendall, Ralph Simpson (1967). The Hawaiian Kingdom 1874–1893, The Kalakaua Dynasty. Vol. 3. Honolulu: University of Hawaii Press. ISBN 978-0-87022-433-1. OCLC 500374815.
- Lim-Chong, Lily; Ball, Harry V. (2010). "Opium and the Law: Hawaiʻi, 1856––1900" (PDF). Chinese America: History & Perspectives – the Journal of the Chinese Historical Society of America. San Francisco: Chinese Historical Society of America with UCLA Asian American Studies Center: 61–74. OCLC 679402743.
- Spaulding, Thomas M. (July 22, 1939). Wilfred B. Shaw and Walter A. Donnelly (ed.). The Grand Duke of Gynbergdrinkenstein. Vol. XLV. Ann Arbor: The Alumni Association of the University of Michigan. pp. 299–305. OCLC 1771843. UOM:39015006955929.
