= Chun Chik-yu =

Chinese-Hawaiian businessman

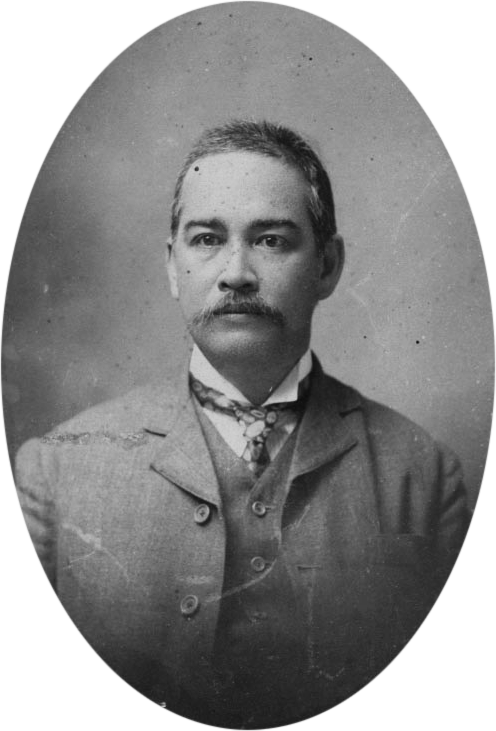
- Chun Chik-yu in western suit

Governor of Guangdong
- In office August 15, 1922 – January 19, 1923
- Preceded by: Wei Bangping
- Succeeded by: Hu Hanmin

Personal details
- Born: June 12, 1859 Honolulu, Oahu, Hawaiian Kingdom
- Died: October 18, 1936 (aged 77)
- Resting place: Meixi
- Spouse: Julien Chang
- Relations: Mary Jane Kekulani Fayerweather (aunt)
- Children: 3
- Occupation: Businessman

Chinese name
- Traditional Chinese: 陳席儒
- Simplified Chinese: 陈席儒
Transcriptions
Standard Mandarin
- Hanyu Pinyin: Chén Xírú
Yue: Cantonese
- Jyutping: can4 zik6 jyu4

Chun Chik-yu (Chinese: 陳席儒; Jyutping: can4 zik6 jyu4; June 12, 1859 – October 18, 1936) was a Chinese-Hawaiian businessman who served briefly as Governor of Guangdong Province from 1922 to 1923. He was born Toney Afong, full name Antone Abram Kekapala Keawemauhili Afong.

== Early life ==
He was born on June 12, 1859, (Note: His certificate of Hawaiian birth issued by the Territory of Hawaii in 1904 recorded his birth date as July 12, 1859 instead.) the eldest son and second child of Chun Afong and Julia Fayerweather Afong. Considered the first Chinese millionaire in Hawaii, his father was a wealthy Honolulu merchant originally from Zhuhai, Guangdong. His mother was an American-British-Hawaiian woman of aliʻi (noble) descent. He had fifteen siblings and at least three half-siblings from his father's first wife Lee Hong in China. (Note: Chun Afong maintained his marriage in China to Lee Hong, his primary kit-fat wife (结发妻), while he married Julia Fayerweather in Hawaii.)

Afong took Toney to China in June 1862. He left his Hawaiian son to live with his Chinese wife and family in Meixi and took his eldest Chinese son Alung back to Hawaii to raise in each other's respective culture for the next seven years. Toney returned with Afong and his half-brother in 1869. Back in Honolulu, Alung was enrolled at Punahou School (called Oahu College) and Toney at ʻIolani School (called St. Alban's College). Both brothers were prepared for college at Hartford Public High School in Connecticut. Alung later enrolled in Yale University under the tutelage of Yung Wing. Toney was also said to have enrolled in either Trinity College, Yale or Harvard University, although there are no known records of his attendance in any of these institutions. (Note: According to historian Bob Dole, "Yale University has Chun Lung’s records, but I have yet to document that Toney went to Harvard. I am relying here on what some descendants were told. Also, Toney is thought by some descendants to have attended Trinity (Hartford) or Yale, but neither college has a record of his attendance.")

== Career ==
Unlike his Hawaiian siblings, Toney later left Hawaii and settled in China with his father. He became a successful businessman in Hong Kong and Macau with another half-brother Chun Kang-yu. They invested heavily in real estate, shipping, railroads, merchandising, and agriculture. He was influential in the Chinese General Chamber of Commerce in Hong Kong and instrumental in the founding of the University of Hong Kong.

The brothers were early supporters of Sun Yat-sen, the founder of the Republic of China who had also been a student at Punahou School in Honolulu. They later allied themselves with Guangdong warlord Chen Jiongming who advocated for a federalist model of government based on the United States against Sun's centralized approach based on Russia. With the backing of Chen, Toney was elected as governor of Guangdong from 1922 to 1923 before being ousted by supporters of Sun. His son Chun Wing-Sen, who became a general under Chen, was shot and killed in the streets of Hong Kong in 1924, possibly a political assassination. Toney retired to Macau and spent the rest of his life collecting Chinese antiques.

== Personal life ==
He married Julien Chang and had three children: Chun Wing-Sen (陳永善), Irene Chun Wing-Luen, Chun Wing-Keu. He also had six concubines but did not have children with them. Irene married T. Y. Lau, the son of Lew Yuk Lin, the last Qing Dynasty ambassador to the Court of St James's. His son Chun Wing-Sen (1827–1924) was a member of the Yale College class of 1912 and became a general under Chen Jiongming before his death.

== Bibliography ==
- Chang, Toy Len; Lum, Arlene; Luke, Terry K. W. (1988). Sailing for the Sun: The Chinese in Hawaii, 1789–1989. Honolulu: University of Hawaii Press. ISBN 978-0-8248-1313-0. OCLC 19270041.
- Dye, Bob (1997). Merchant Prince of the Sandalwood Mountains: Afong and the Chinese in Hawaiʻi. Honolulu: University of Hawaii Press. ISBN 978-0-8248-1772-5. OCLC 247424976.
- Dye, Robert Paul (2010). "Merchant Prince: Chun Afong in Hawaiʻi, 1849–90" (PDF). Chinese America: History & Perspectives. 15. San Francisco: Chinese Historical Society of America with UCLA Asian American Studies Center: 23–36. OCLC 818922702.
- Lam, Margaret M. (1932). Six Generations of Race Mixture in Hawaii. Honolulu: University of Hawaii, Sociology MA Thesis. OCLC 16325277.
- Proctor, Mortimer Robinson, ed. (1912). History of the Class of 1912, Yale College. New Haven: Yale University.
- Restarick, Henry Bond (1924). Hawaii, 1778–1920, from the Viewpoint of a Bishop: Being the Story of English and American Churchmen in Hawaii with Historical Sidelights. Honolulu: Paradise of the Pacific. OCLC 1337282.
- Teng, Emma Jinhua (2013). Eurasian: Mixed Identities in the United States, China, and Hong Kong, 1842–1943. Berkeley: University of California Press. ISBN 978-0-520-95700-8. OCLC 854611998.
