= Edward William Purvis =

British army officer (1857–1888)

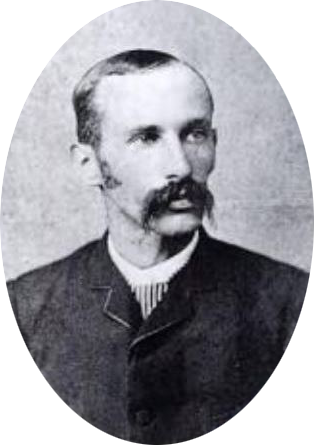
- Born: July 4, 1857
- Died: August 16, 1888 (aged 31); Colorado Springs, Colorado, US
- Burial place: Evergreen Cemetery
- Military career
- Allegiance: United Kingdom; Kingdom of Hawaii
- Branch: 70th (Surrey) Regiment; 31st (Huntingdonshire) Regiment; King's Staff (Hawaii)
- Rank: Colonel, Major, Sub-Lieutenant

Colonel Edward William Purvis (July 4, 1857 – August 16, 1888) was a British army officer and settler of the Kingdom of Hawaii who served as Vice-Chamberlain during the reign of King Kalākaua. After resigning from the royal household, Purvis published two political satires aimed at undermining the image of the king and his prime minister, Walter M. Gibson, who had been responsible for the removal of Purvis' superior. These actions and other factors led to the demise of the Gibson regime and the Bayonet Constitution of 1887. Purvis died in the following year, after going to the United States to seek medical attention for his health. According to popular legend, he was an expert player of the Portuguese machete or cavaquinho and was believed to be the inspiration for the name of the Hawaiian ukulele.

== Early life ==
Purvis was born on July 4, 1857, into a family of Scottish descent. His parents were Robert Raaf Purvis and Annie Silburn Marshall. His paternal grandfather, William Purvis, who worked as a trader and ship captain, had settled in the Dutch East Indies in the 1810s while it was still part of the British Empire. The family lived in many places including Dutch East Indies, Brussels, and London. Educated at Cheltenham College and the Royal Military College, Sandhurst, Edward William Purvis served as a sub-lieutenant of the 70th (Surrey) Regiment of Foot in Bengal, where he learned Hindi, and later as a sub-lieutenant for the 31st (Huntingdonshire) Regiment of Foot in Chatham, Kent. Around 1879 he resigned his British Army post and traveled to the Hawaiian Islands, where his father and older brother Robert William Theodore Purvis had already settled, having arrived on December 13, 1877; his brother Theodore had started a sugar plantation business on the island of Kauai. A distant cousin of theirs was William Herbert Purvis, known for introducing macadamia nuts to Hawaii.

== Career in Hawaii ==
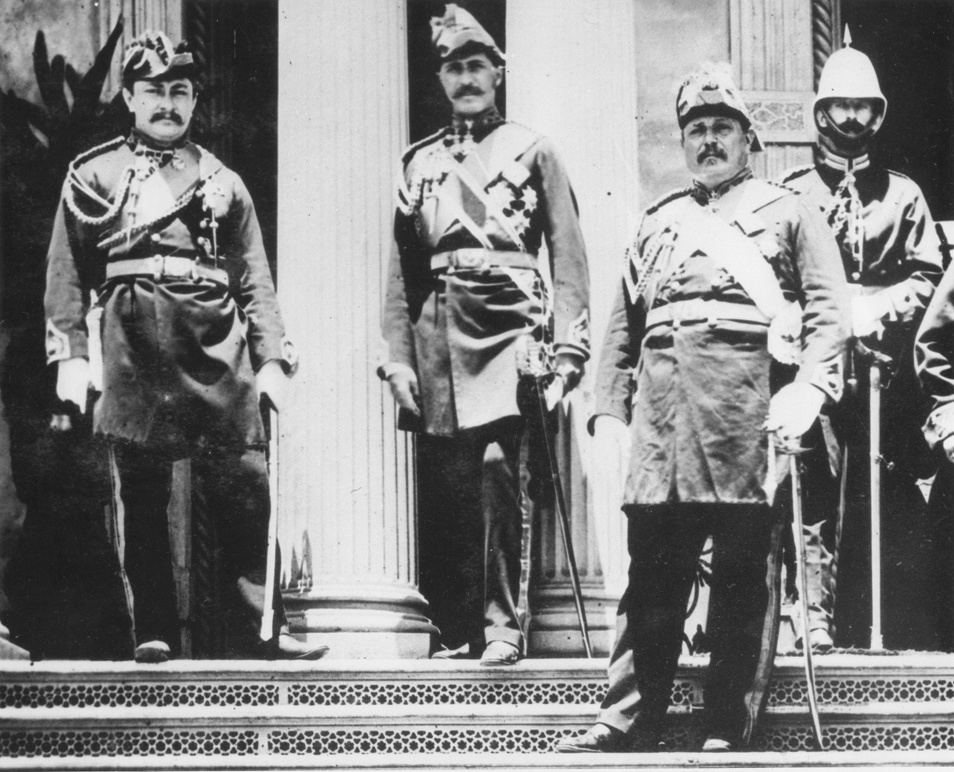
Purvis standing on far right with Hawaiian Army Colonels James Harbottle Boyd, Curtis P. Iaukea and Charles Hastings Judd on the steps of the ʻIolani Palace, 1882

Purvis settled in Honolulu around 1879. On August 26, 1882, he was created a major in the Hawaiian military and appointed as military instructor. He was also appointed as King Kalākaua's Vice-Chamberlain under Chamberlain Charles Hastings Judd. In 1882 he served as acting chamberlain during Judd's trip to Europe and was appointed as a member of the King's Staff with the rank of colonel on December 23, 1884. By the end of August 1886, he had resigned the office of vice chamberlain after his superior Judd was dismissed from his post. Purvis had been asked to resign by the king at the instigation of the newly appointed prime minister, Walter M. Gibson, and the cabinet ministers.

Between 1886 and 1887 Purvis attempted to undermine the Gibson administration. He was alleged to be the author or co-author, along with Alatau T. Atkinson, of The Grand Duke of Gynbergdrinkenstein and the Gynberg Ballad, two anonymous political satires that parodied the corruption of the Hawaiian court and mocked Kalākaua, Gibson, and other people in their inner circle. According to Ralph Simpson Kuykendall, these were "a satirical take-off on various features and incidents of the Kalakaua–Gibson regime" used "to convince the public that the administration of the kingdom was not only corrupt and unworthy of trust, but also ridiculous". To the annoyance of the government, these two pamphlets were widely circulated in Honolulu and even sent to London by the British ambassador to Hawaii. These works and other factors including the Aki opium scandal and the failed attempt to form a Polynesian Confederacy contributed to the demise of the Gibson administration and the passage of the Bayonet Constitution of 1887, which severely limited the power of the king.

Purvis made many friends among Hawaii's Portuguese immigrant community and became an expert player of the machete (otherwise known as the cavaquinho). Thus, it is popularly believed that the Hawaiian musical instrument, the ukulele (an adaption of these Portuguese instruments), was named for Purvis, as the term can be translated as "jumping flea" – a nickname of the small, excitable, and quick-fingered Purvis. Modern scholarship has cast doubt on this popular legend, though. According to historians John King and Jim Tranquada, "it is unlikely that the nickname of a man who sought to undermine the king in the months prior to the imposition of the Bayonet Constitution of 1887 would have been applied to an instrument favored by native Hawaiians".

== Later life and death ==
After 1886 Purvis became a resident of Hanamaulu, on the island of Kauai. He was appointed Animal Inspector for Kauai on November 14, 1887. In May 1888 he left the Hawaiian Islands for the United States for his health. Settling in Colorado Springs, Colorado, he initially wrote home stating that he was improving, but his condition worsened. His brother Theodore traveled all the way from Hawaii to see him for the last time before he died on August 16, 1888. He was 31 years old at the time of his death. His brother-in-law Edmund William Holdsworth was chosen as administrator of his estate; Purvis' will, written on April 22, left everything to his brother Theodore Purvis. His remains were interred in the Evergreen Cemetery in Colorado Springs.

== Honors ==
- Royal Order of Kapiolani, Commander, 1884

== Bibliography ==
- Dixon, Daniel; Dixon, Dixie; McKay, Jayne (2014). Ukulele: The World's Friendliest Instrument. Layton, Utah: Gibbs Smith. ISBN 978-1-4236-1812-6. OCLC 886540256.
- Forbes, David W., ed. (2003). Hawaiian National Bibliography, 1780–1900, Volume 4: 1881–1900. Vol. 4. Honolulu, Hawaii: University of Hawaii Press. ISBN 978-0-8248-2636-9. OCLC 123279964.
- Fordyce, George Dingwall, ed. (1861). The Scottish Jurist: Being Reports of Cases Decided in the Supreme Courts of Scotland, and in the House of Lords on Appeal from Scotland. Vol. XXXIII. Edinburgh: Thomas Constable. pp. 404–415. OCLC 15194668.
- Great Britain. Ministry of Defence (May 1879). The Army List. London: H. M. Stationery Office. p. 244. OCLC 11100917.
- Hart, H. G. (1877). The New Annual Army List, Militia List, and Indian Civil Service List. London: John Murray. p. 83. OCLC 944332175.
- Hart, H. G. (1879). The New Annual Army List, Militia List, and Yeomanry Cavalry List. London: John Murray. p. 216. OCLC 558488183.
- Hunter, Andrew Alexander, ed. (1890). Cheltenham College Register, 1841–1889. London: Bell. p. 280. OCLC 152407676.
- Insight Guides (2014). Insight Guides: Hawaii. Singapore: APA Publications. ISBN 978-1-78005-794-1. OCLC 888186117.
- King, John; Tranquada, Jim (2003). "New History of the Origins and Development of the 'Ukulele, 1838–1915". The Hawaiian Journal of History. 37. Honolulu, Hawaii: Hawaiian Historical Society: 1–32. hdl:10524/382. OCLC 60626541.
- Kuykendall, Ralph Simpson (1967). The Hawaiian Kingdom 1874–1893, The Kalakaua Dynasty. Vol. 3. Honolulu, Hawaii: University of Hawaii Press. ISBN 978-0-87022-433-1. OCLC 500374815.
- Merriam-Webster, Inc (January 1991). The Merriam-Webster New Book of Word Histories. Springfield, Massachusetts: Merriam-Webster. p. 481. ISBN 978-0-87779-603-9. OCLC 234200711.
- Shigeura, Gordon Tokiyoshi; Ooka, Hiroshi (1984). Macadamia Nuts in Hawaii, History and Production (PDF). Honolulu, Hawaii: University of Hawaii. OCLC 632022107.
- Siddall, John William (1921). Men of Hawaii. Vol. 2. Honolulu, Hawaii: Honolulu Star-Bulletin. p. 323. OCLC 16326675.
- Siler, Julia Flynn (2012). Lost Kingdom: Hawaii's Last Queen, the Sugar Kings and America's First Imperial Adventure. New York: Atlantic Monthly Press. ISBN 978-0-8021-9488-6. OCLC 881683650.
