= Pam Chun =

American writer

Pam Chun is a writer and marketing consultant. Chun's novels include The Money Dragon, When Strange Gods Call, and The Perfect Tea Thief. She has been a fiction judge for the 2006 and 2007 Kiriyama book Prize.
