= Tai Sing Loo =

American photographer (1886–1971)

- Born: 1886
- Died: 1971 (aged 84–85)
- Known for: Photography

Tai Sing Loo (1886–1971) was a photographer of Pearl Harbor and many sporting events in Hawaii.

From 1909 to 1918, he worked with the Gurrey studio. From 1919 until his retirement in 1949, he served as an official Navy photographer. In that capacity, he photographed the Pearl Harbor Naval Shipyard and the battleships, and recorded VIP visits, funerals and recreational events. He also photographed for the Interisland Steamship Company and was an accomplished landscape photographer. Some of his well-known photographs include many of Duke Kahanamoku, Pearl Harbor before and after the bombing, celebrities and presidential visits to Hawaii. In 1984, the US Navy honored Tai Sing Loo with a calendar chronicling his career (see bibliography). Loo also helped to break the Japanese Codes that were put into false newspaper advertisements that detailed when the attack would occur and the formations of the planes for the attack.

Loo and his wife Florence had two sons and two daughters; Florence Loo (Baptist) (b.1929), Evelyn Loo (Lee) (b. 1932), Franklin Ting Fai Loo (1934–2002), Robert Ting Ho Loo (1938–?).

Tai Sing's father, Sam Choy Loo, arrived in Hawaii in the 1880s on a ship called the Cassandra. The Loo family came from Kwangtung, China, Chung Shan (Koon sheoung Doo Society). Sam Choy Loo was a Gold Leaf Sign Painter. Tai Sing had two brothers; Tai Chung, Hoon ("Cowboy"), three sisters (names not known). Sisters married into the Choy family, Young/Lum family (Broom Factory). One daughter never married and is buried in a plot at the Pauoa Chinese Cemetery. Parents and brothers are buried in Manoa Chinese Cemetery. Tai Sing grew up in Honolulu in what is now Foster Botanical Garden. The first listing of the Loo family was in 1908 in the Honolulu city directory and the 1910 Census. Tai Sing's mother used to pray for people at Kwan Yin Temple on Vineyard Boulevard and River Street. The only Christian of the Loo family, the others practiced Daoism and Buddhism and honored Kwan Yin. Tai Sing lived on the US mainland in Twentynine Palms, California. Moved to Manoa Marquis Lane.

== Gallery ==
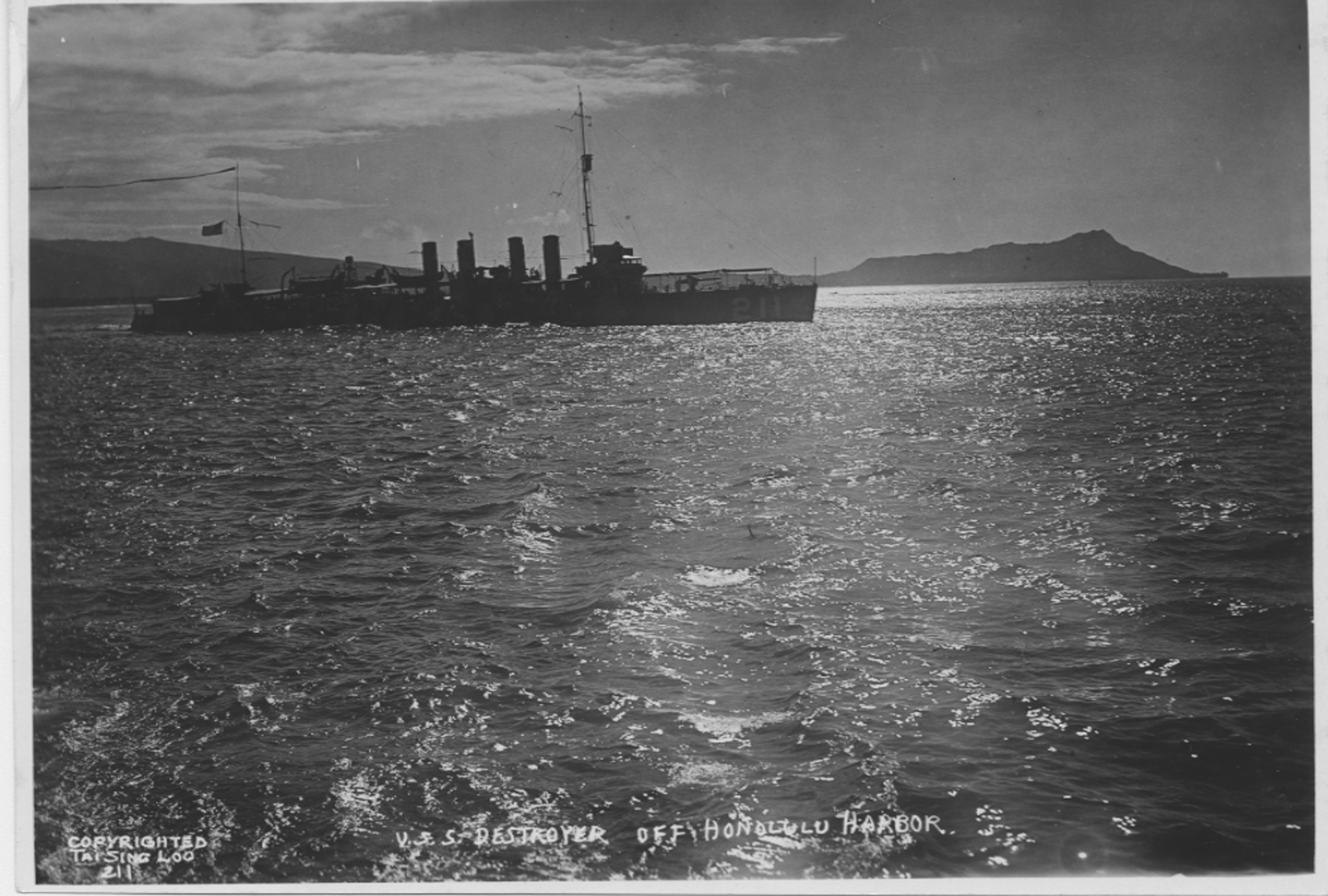
USS Alden

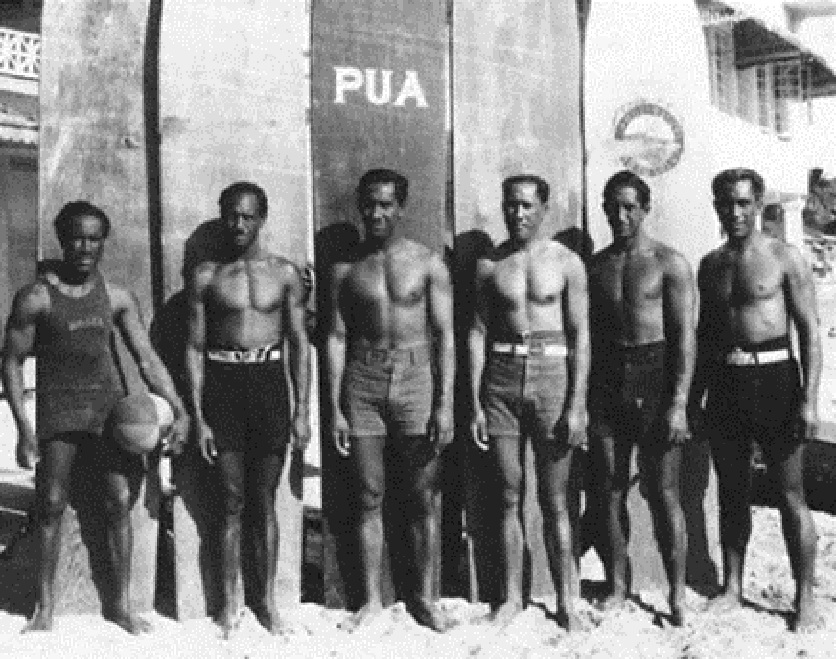
Duke Kahanamoku (far right) and his brothers

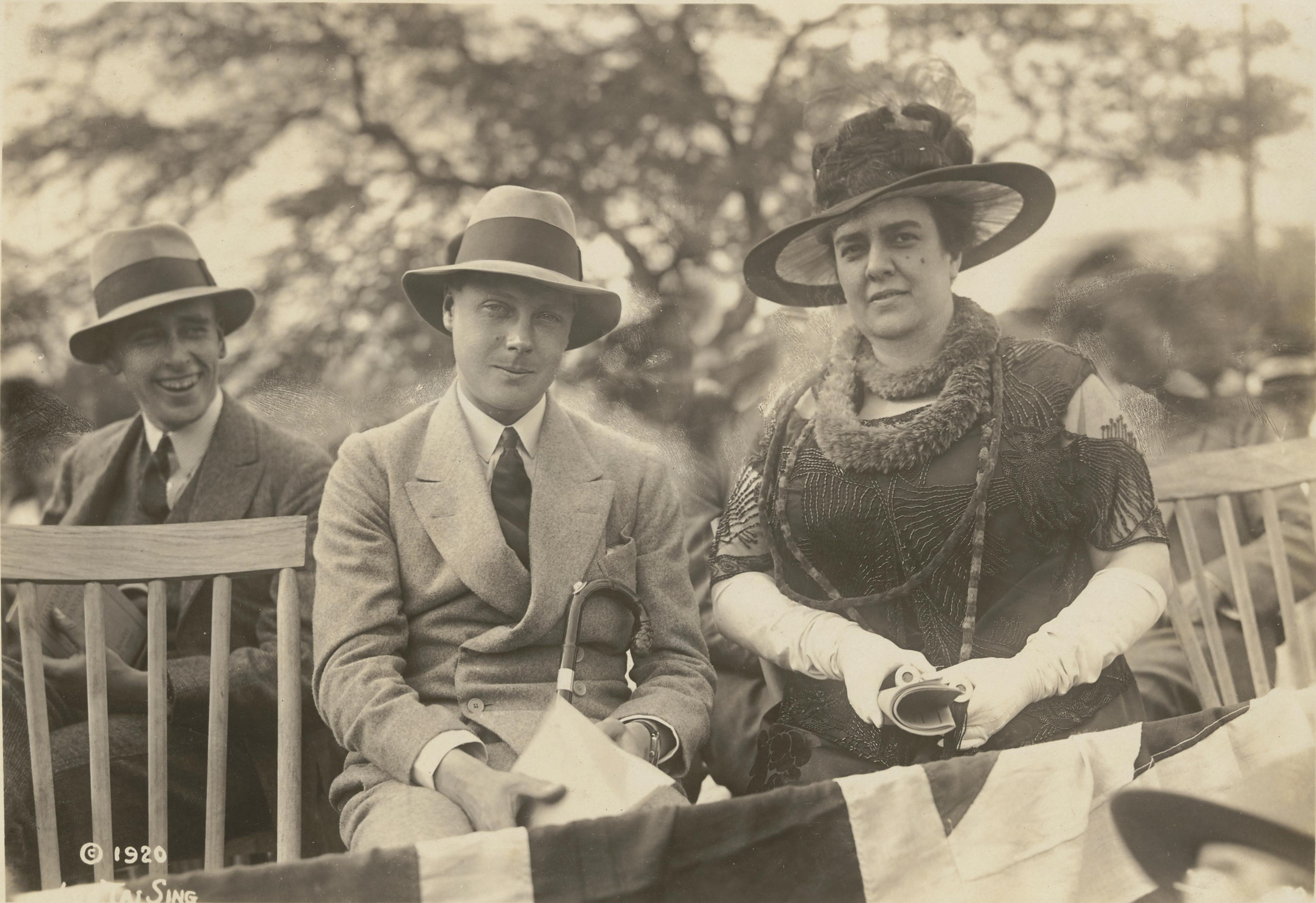
Abigail Kawānanakoa and Edward, Prince of Wales

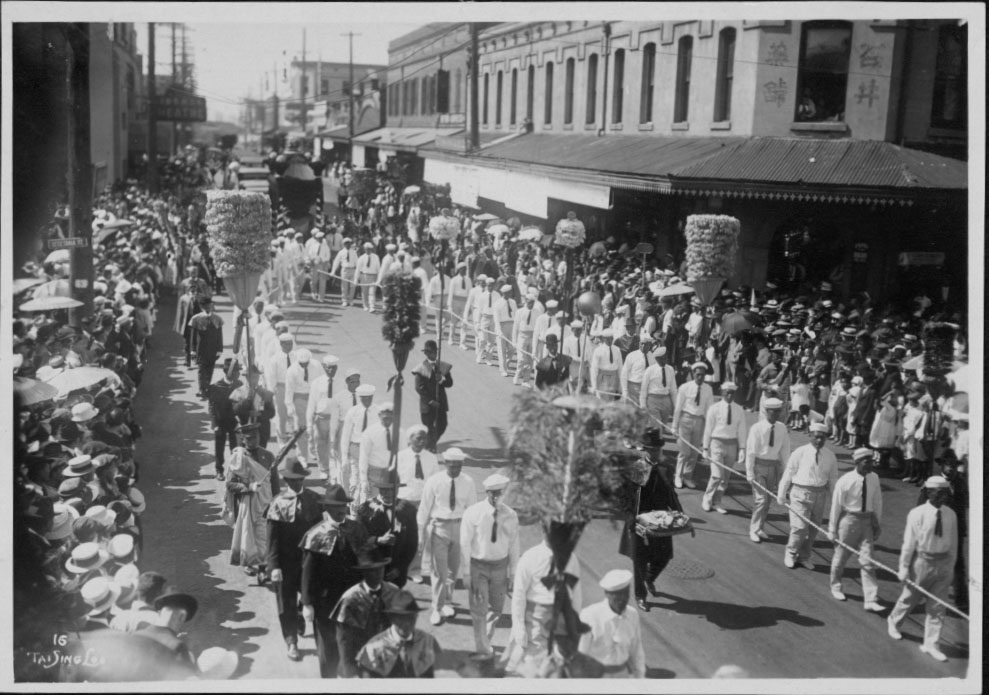
Funeral of Prince Jonah Kūhiō Kalanianaʻole

== Bibliography ==
- The U.S. Navy in Hawaii: One Man's Perspective : a Pictorial Calendar for 1984. United States Naval Institute. 1983. ISBN 9780870210426.
