= Julia Fayerweather Afong =

Hawaiian high chiefess and wife of Chun Afong (1840–1919)

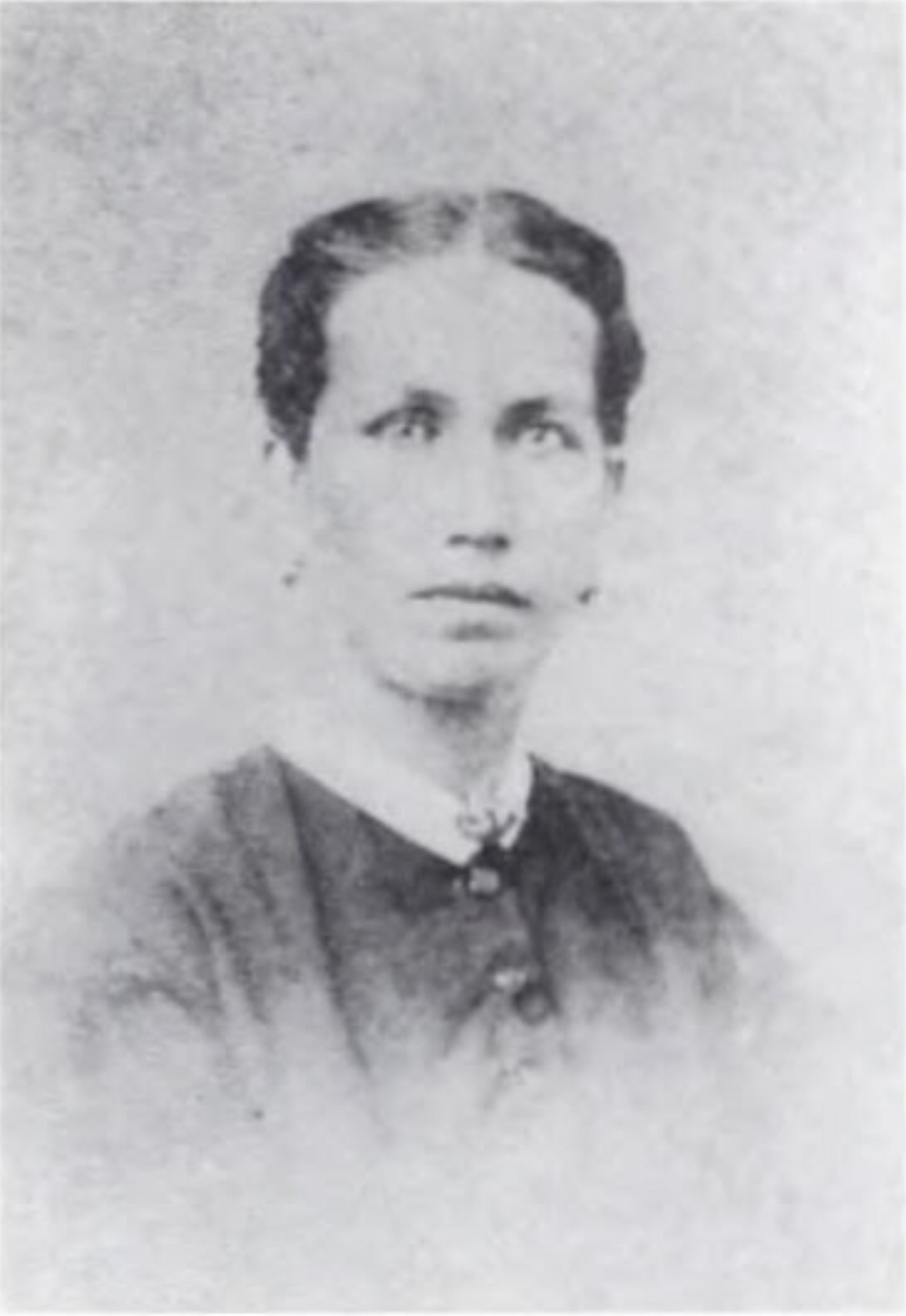
- Julia Fayerweather Afong in her youth
- Born: Julia Hope Kamakia Paaikamokalani o Kinau Beckley Fayerweather; February 1, 1840; Honolulu, Kingdom of Hawaii
- Died: February 14, 1919 (aged 79); Honolulu, Territory of Hawaii
- Spouse: Chun Afong (1857–1906; his death)
- Children: 16
- Relatives: Mary Jane Kekulani Fayerweather (sister), George Charles Beckley (maternal grandfather)

Julia Hope Kamakia Paaikamokalani o Kinau Beckley Fayerweather Afong (February 1, 1840 – February 14, 1919) was a Hawaiian high chiefess who married Chinese millionaire merchant Chun Afong with whom she had sixteen children. She was of British, American and Hawaiian descent.

== Life ==
Julia Hope Kamakia Paaikamokalani o Kinau Beckley Fayerweather was born on February 1, 1840, in Honolulu, Kingdom of Hawaii, the first-born child and daughter of Abraham Henry Fayerweather (1812–1850) and Mary Kekahimoku Kolimoalani Beckley (1820–1850). Her family was considered part of the aliʻi (noble) class.

Her father was originally from New Canaan, Connecticut, and settled in Hawaii, where he was a business associate of Hunnewell and Peirce before becoming chief accountant of C. Brewer & Co.. Her mother was a daughter of English sea captain George Charles Beckley and Native Hawaiian high chiefess Elizabeth Ahia (1797–1854). Beckley came to Hawaii in 1806, served in the councils of Kamehameha I, and was appointed the first commandant of the Honolulu fort in 1816. Ahia was a distant relation of the reigning House of Kamehameha and a descendant of the 15th-century King Līloa.

Julia's younger siblings were William Malulani Fayerweather (1841–1843), who died young; Mary Jane Kekulani Fayerweather (1842–1930), who married Benoni Richmond Davison and later Andreas Avelino Montano; and Hannah Kealiipuahao o Kinau Fayerweather (1843–1870), who married Thomas Kamukamu Bell.

On May 28, 1857, she married Chinese millionaire merchant Chun Afong. The wedding ceremony was officiated by American Protestant missionary Reverend Lowell Smith. This marriage connected Afong to the reigning Kamehameha family and the ruling Hawaiian elite class. In 1874, her husband supported the political aspirations of Kalākaua (who shared a wet nurse with Julia and was considered a foster brother). Afong quietly gave financial support to Kalākaua in the election of 1874 against Queen Emma (the widow of Kamehameha IV). After the king's election, he appointed Afong to his Privy Council of State. The family business in Hawaiʻi steadily grew with investments in retail, shipping, opium sales, and sugar and coffee plantations.

After the death of Afong's eldest son Chun Alung in 1889, he sold or reorganized most of his business holdings in Hawaiʻi and invested in the Douglas Steamship Company in Hong Kong. He named Samuel Mills Damon as administrator of an estate left in Hawaiʻi to support Julia and their many children. Afong never returned to Hawaiʻi and died in Hong Kong in 1906.

Julia Afong died in Honolulu, at the age of 79, on February 14, 1919. She was buried at the O'ahu Cemetery next to her son Jimmie.

== Children ==
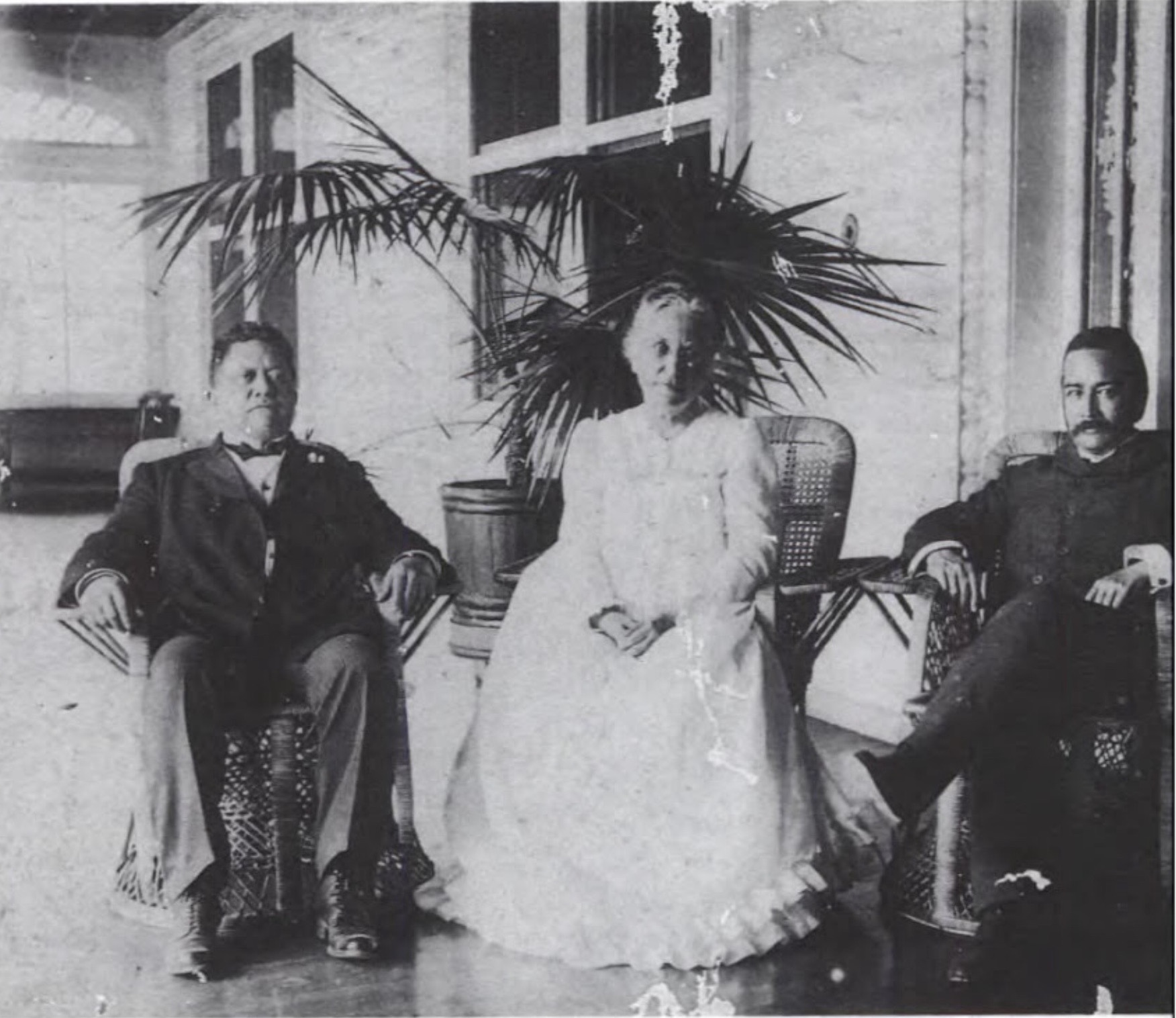
Julia Afong (center) with her cousin George Charles Beckley and son Toney Afong

Julia and Afong had sixteen children. The following list of descendants is compiled from the family in Dye's Merchant Prince of the Sandalwood Mountains: (Note: Dye's wife Tessa Gay Magoon was a great-great granddaughter of Chun Afong. The "Sandalwood Mountains" in the title was the Chinese name for the Hawaiian Islands later Honolulu in the 19th-century, after the abundant trees which were exported to Asia during the reign of Kamehameha I.)

Their sixteen children included:

1. Emmeline Agatha Marie Kailimoku Afong (1858–1946), married firstly Henry Giles and had one daughter; and married secondly John Alfred Magoon and had seven children.
2. Antone "Toney" Abram Kekapala Keawemauhili Afong / Chun Chik-yu (1859–1936), married Julien Chang and had three children, Chun Wing-Sen, Irene Chun Wing-Luen, and Chun Wing-Keu. He served as governor of Guangdong from 1922 to 1923.
3. Nancy Eldorah Luhana Frederica Afong (1861–1940), married Francis Blately McStocker and had three children. Her husband served as chairman of the Executive Committee of the Annexation Club and helped form the Citizens' Guard, the armed militia of the Republic of Hawaiʻi.
4. Mary Catherine Afong (1862–1945), never married.
5. Julia Hope Afong (1864–1953), married Arthur Miller Johnstone and had eight children.
6. Marie K. Afong (1867–1925), married Abram Stephanus Humphreys and had four children.
7. Elizabeth K. Afong (1869–1965), married Ignatius R. Burns and had no children.
8. Henrietta (Etta) Patrinella Kealaiki Afong (1870–1940), married firstly United States Navy Rear Admiral William Henry Whiting and had a daughter; and married secondly Rear Admiral Ammen Farenholt and had no children.
9. Alice Lillian Afong (1872–1953), married Edson Lewis Hutchinson and had one son.
10. Helen Gertrude Afong (1873–1953), married firstly William A. Henshall and had one son; and married secondly George F. Henshall and had no children.
11. Caroline Bartlett Afong (1874–1942), married first Jacob Morton Riggs and married secondly Leonard Camp. No children from either marriage.
12. James "Jimmie" Edward Fayerweather Afong (1875–1875), died young.
13. Albert Fayerweather Leialoha Afong (1877–1948), married Anna Elizabeth Whiting and had four children: Elizabeth Kamakia Afong, Mary Katherine Afong, Katherine Whiting Afong, and Julia Fayerweather Afong. He became the first person of Chinese descent to head the Honolulu Stock Exchange.
14. Martha Muriel Afong (1878–1983), married Andrew J. Dougherty and had three children.
15. Beatrice Melanie Afong (1880–1959), married firstly James Walter Wall Brewster and had two children; and married secondly Frank Moss and had no children.
16. Abram Henry Afong (1883–1933), married May Harvey and had one son Alvin Henry Afong.

== Legacy ==
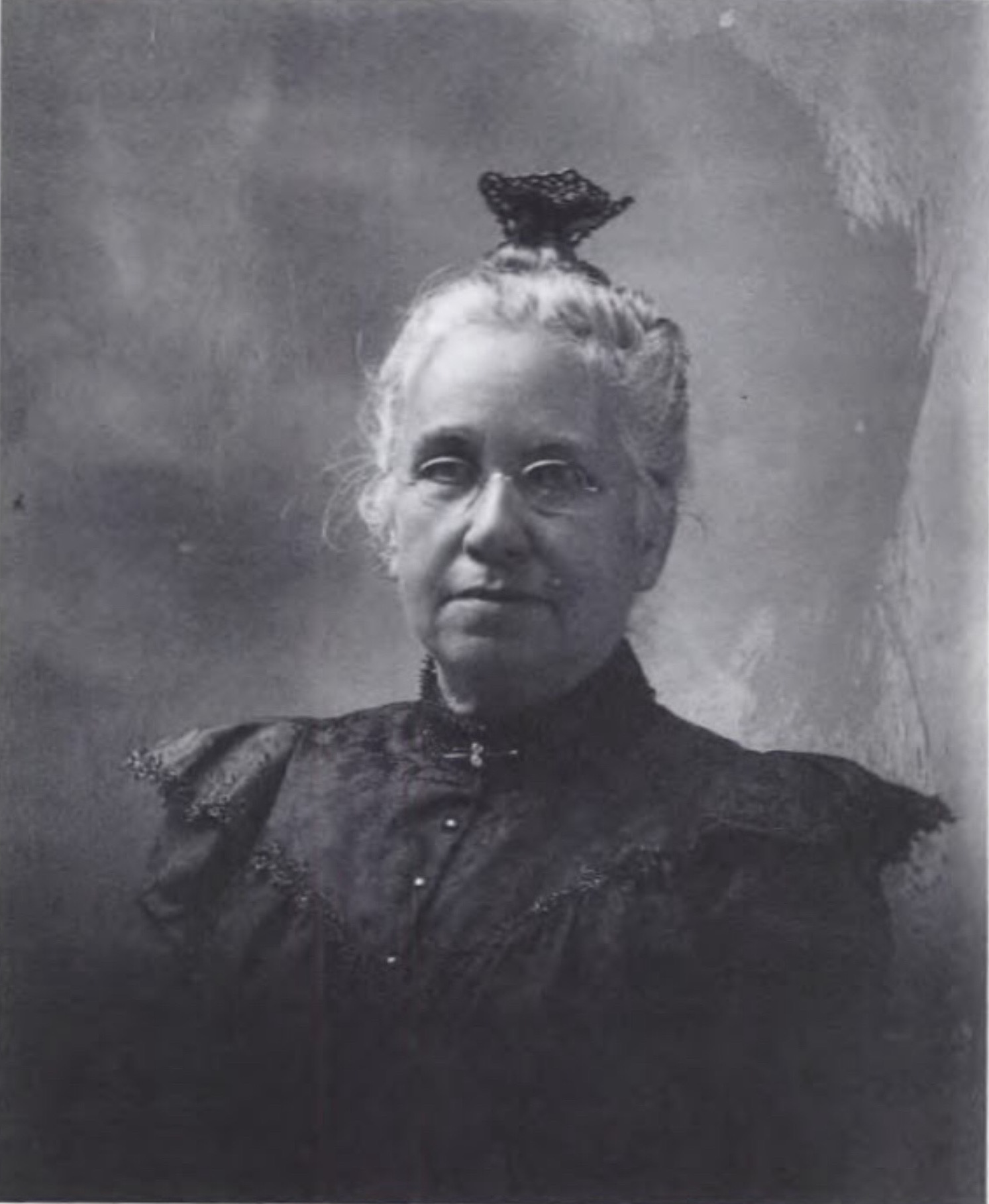
An elderly Julia Fayerweather Afong

In 1909, Julia and Afong's life was fictionalized in the short magazine story, “Chun Ah Chun”, by American novelist Jack London. It was later published in his 1912 book The House of Pride: And Other Tales of Hawaiʻi. London's highly embellished story of Afong depicts him as a "crafty coolie" who spites the white capitalist establishment through his own business success. He also entices white men with money to marry his racially-mixed daughters across the color-line. Julia was portrayed as "Stella Allendale, herself a subject of the brown-skinned king, though more of Anglo-Saxon blood ran in her veins than of Polynesian". In 1961, his great-grandson Eaton "Bob" Magoon Jr. wrote the book, music and lyrics to 13 Daughters, a short-lived Broadway musical. Don Ameche played the eponymous Chun while Monica Boyar portrayed his wife Emmaloa (based on Julia).

The site of the Afong family's Waikīkī villa, where royalty and dignitaries were entertained, was sold in 1904 to the United States Army Corps of Engineers for the construction of Battery Randolph and Battery Dudley, built to defend Honolulu Harbor from foreign attacks. It is now part of the property of the U.S. Army Museum of Hawaiʻi and Fort DeRussy Military Reservation. An informational marker describing the villa and Afong's legacy and is a stop on the Waikīkī Historic Trail.

== Bibliography ==
Newspapers and online sources

- Creamer, Beverly (November 28, 2002). "Ballet dancer Tessa Dye, who toured Asia and Europe, dead at 56". The Honolulu Advertiser. Honolulu.
- Gee, Pat (November 27, 2002). "Tessa Gay Dye / Magoon Estate Director: Ballerina embraced family life, community service". Honolulu Star-Bulletin. Honolulu.
- Prats, J. J.; Miller, Richard E.; Pfingsten, Bill, eds. (November 16, 2008). "Afong Villa — Waikīkī Historic Trail". The Historical Marker Database. Archived from the original on March 6, 2012.
- Sigall, Bob (July 26, 2013). "Chun Afong arrived in 1849 and got right to business". Honolulu Star-Advertiser. Honolulu.
- Sigall, Bob (August 2, 2013). "The Hungry Lion lived large at shopping plaza". Honolulu Star-Advertiser. Honolulu.
- Sigall, Bob (May 1, 2015). "Chinese businesses enjoy profitable history in Hawaii". Honolulu Star-Advertiser. Honolulu.
- Tsai, Michael (February 7, 2010). "Dye, Suwa: Isle visionaries". The Honolulu Advertiser. Honolulu.

Books and journals

- Day, Arthur Grove (1984). History Makers of Hawaii: a Biographical Dictionary. Honolulu: Mutual Publishing of Honolulu. ISBN 978-0-935180-09-1. OCLC 11087565.
- Day, Arthur Grove (1987). Mad About Islands: Novelists Of A Vanished Pacific. Honolulu: Mutual Publishing. ISBN 978-0-935180-46-6. OCLC 17445516.
- Dye, Bob (1997). Merchant Prince of the Sandalwood Mountains: Afong and the Chinese in Hawaiʻi. Honolulu: University of Hawaii Press. ISBN 978-0-8248-1772-5. OCLC 247424976.
- Dye, Robert Paul (2010). "Merchant Prince: Chun Afong in Hawaiʻi, 1849–90" (PDF). Chinese America: History & Perspectives. 15. San Francisco: Chinese Historical Society of America with UCLA Asian American Studies Center: 23–36. OCLC 818922702.
- Lam, Margaret M. (1932). Six Generations of Race Mixture in Hawaii. Honolulu: University of Hawaii, Sociology MA Thesis. OCLC 16325277.
- New England Historic Genealogical Society (1992). The New England Historical and Genealogical Register. Boston: New England Historic Genealogical Society. OCLC 2564052.
- Ng, Franklin (1999). "Chun Afong". In Kim, Hyung-chan (ed.). Distinguished Asian Americans: A Biographical Dictionary. Westport, CT: Greenwood Publishing Group. pp. 6–8. ISBN 978-0-313-28902-6. OCLC 237359631.
- Peterson, Barbara Bennett, ed. (1984). Notable Women of Hawaii. Honolulu: University of Hawaii Press. ISBN 978-0-8248-0820-4. OCLC 11030010.
