= Chinese immigration to Hawaii =

Pākē
Total population
- 198,711 (2010)

Languages
- Cantonese, English, Hawaiian, Hawaiian Pidgin, Hakka

Religion
- Catholicism, Protestantism; Buddhism, Confucianism, Taoism

Related ethnic groups
- Hakka Americans, Cantonese people

The Chinese in Hawaii constitute about 4.7% of the state's population, most of whom (75%) are Cantonese people with ancestors from Zhongshan in Guangdong. This number does not include people of mixed Chinese and Hawaiian descent. If all people with Chinese ancestry in Hawaii (including the Chinese-Hawaiians) are included, they form about 1/3 of Hawaii's entire population. As United States citizens, they are a group of Chinese Americans. A minority of this group have Hakka ancestry.

== History ==
Historical records indicated that the earliest presence of Chinese in Hawaii dates back to the late 18th century: a few sailors in 1778 with Captain James Cook's journey, more in 1788 with John Meares, and some in 1789 with American trader Simon Metcalfe, who reached Maui from Macau. Visiting the Sandwich Islands in 1794, Captain George Vancouver reported seeing one Chinese resident.

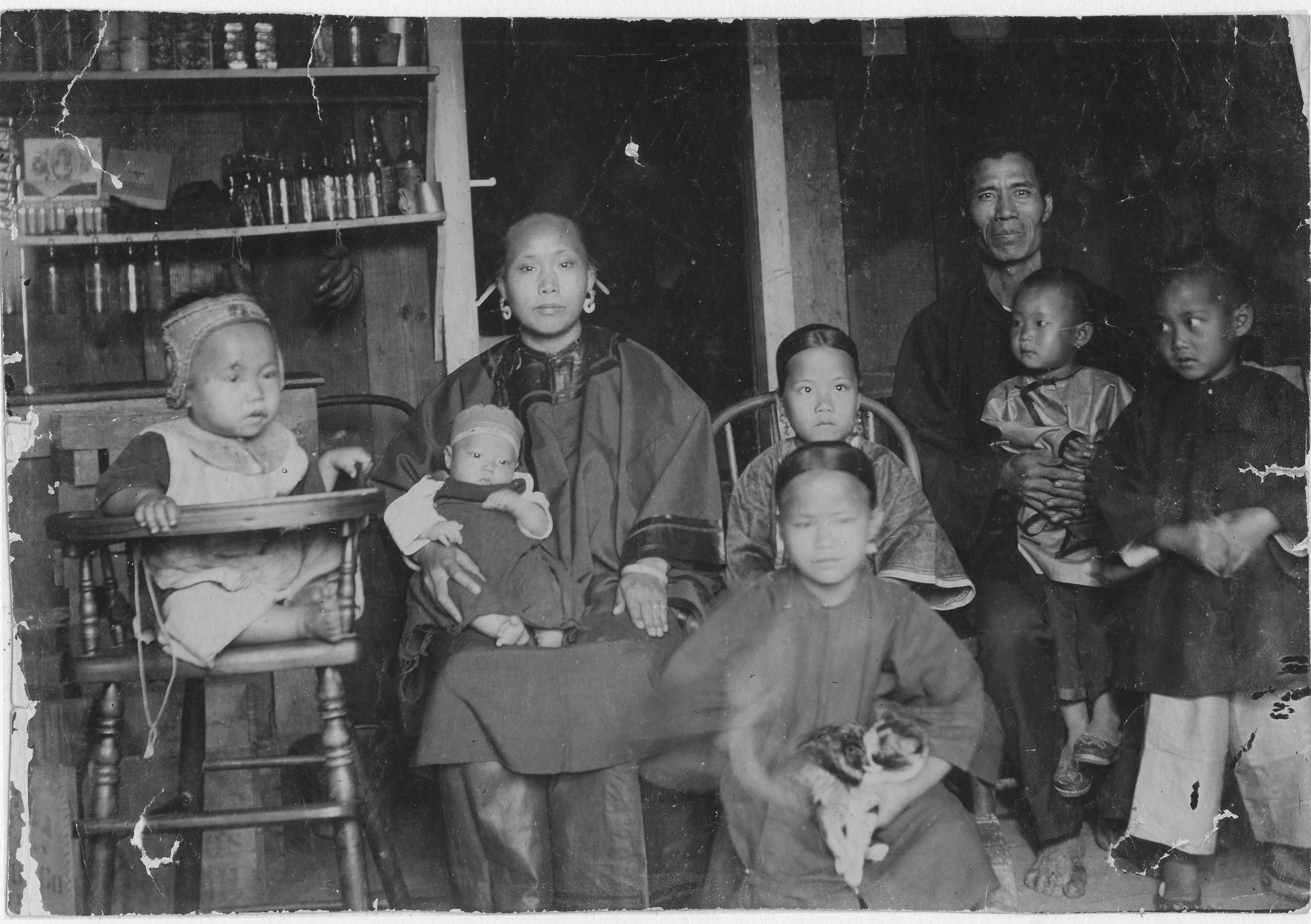
Chinese immigrant family living in Honolulu in 1893.

Encouraged by King Kamehameha I, Hawaii exported sandalwood to China from 1792 to around 1843. As a result, Chinese people dubbed the Hawaiian Islands "Tan Heung Shan" (Chinese: 檀香山), roughly "Fragrant Sandalwood Hills" in Cantonese. Between 1852 and 1899, around 46,000 Chinese immigrated to Hawaii. In 1900, the Chinese population in Hawaii was 25,767. More of these migrants were from Fukien and spoke Fukienese rather than Cantonese. An American missionary observing Maui in 1856 found that the primarily Cantonese shopkeepers and Fukienese laborers communicated in the Hawaiian language.

Although many came as laborers for sugar plantations in Hawaii, they concentrated on getting education for their children. When their contracts expired, many decided to remain in Hawaii and opened businesses in areas such as Chinatown. By 1950 most Chinese American men in Hawaii were educated and held good jobs. Today 95% of Chinese Americans in Hawaii live in Honolulu.

A significant minority of early Chinese immigrants to Hawaii, and even fewer to the Continental US, were Hakka, and much of the animosity between the Hakka and Punti Cantonese people carried over. In the first half of the 1800s, around 30 percent of Chinese in Hawaii were of Hakka, while only about 3 percent in the West Coast were Hakka. The largest surge of immigration in that century occurred after an 1876 treaty between the US and Kingdom of Hawaii led to an increased need for labor.

The majority of marriages between Chinese men and European women in Hawaii were between Cantonese men and Portuguese women. Portuguese and other European women married Chinese men. These unions between Cantonese men and Portuguese women resulted in children of mixed Cantonese-Portuguese parentage, called Cantonese-Portuguese. For two years to June 30, 1933, 38 of these children were born, they were classified as pure Chinese because their fathers were Chinese. A large amount of mixing took place between Chinese and European, Chinese men married Portuguese, Spanish, Hawaiian, Caucasian-Hawaiian, etc. Only one Chinese man was recorded marrying an American woman. Chinese men in Hawaii also married Puerto Rican, Portuguese, Japanese, Greek, and half-white women. There was a communal ban on intermarriages between the two groups for the first generation of migrants. In the middle of the 19th century, Hakka immigrants in America were excluded from membership in the Chinese organizations.

== Religion ==
Prior to the arrival of Christian missionaries in Hawaii, the early Chinese settlers were adherents of Buddhism, Taoism, and Confucianism. Some even blended aspects of native Hawaiian beliefs into their own belief systems.

Today, due to the work of Christian missionaries in the late 19th century and the 20th century, many of the Chinese in Hawaii are adherents of Protestant and Roman Catholic Christianity. Still, about 100 Buddhist and ancestral temples remain. The minority who adhere to traditional Chinese religions pay pilgrimage to their ancestors annually. However, no accurate statistics of adherents within the Chinese community in Hawaiʻi are available.

== List of notable Chinese people from Hawaiʻi ==
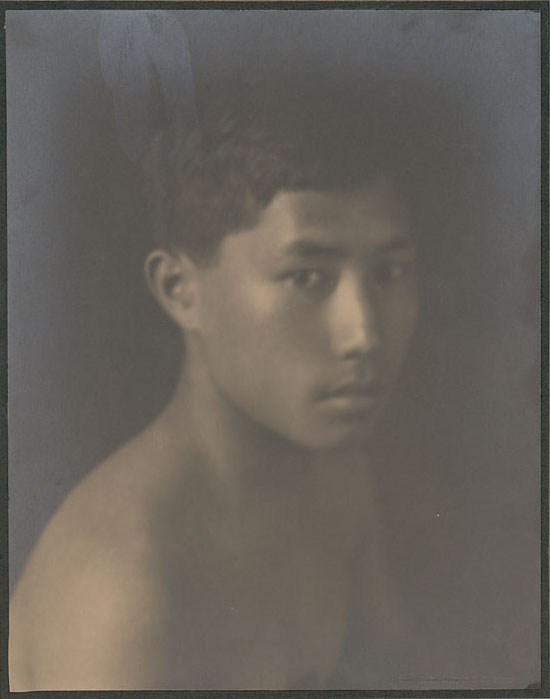
Hapa-pake (Chinese-Hawaiian) boy, 1909

- Sneeze Achiu
- Chun Afong
- Daniel K. Akaka
- Joseph Apukai Akina
- Chang Apana
- Brian Ching
- Madison Chock
- Norm Chow
- William K. S. Chow
- Sam Choy
- Kam-Fong Chun
- Gordon Pai'ea Chung-Hoon
- Auliʻi Cravalho
- Hiram L. Fong
- Clayton Hee
- Don Ho
- Hoku Ho
- Kelly Hu
- Jason Scott Lee
- Richard Loo
- Tai Sing Loo
- Agnes Lum
- Carissa Moore
- William S. Richardson
- Megan Skiendiel
- Logan Tom
- Hinaleimoana Wong-Kalu
- Khalil Fong

== See also ==
- Filipinos in Hawaii
- Japanese in Hawaii
- Puerto Rican immigration to Hawaii
- Korean immigration to Hawaii
- Chinese immigration to Puerto Rico
