= Manoa Chinese Cemetery =

Cemetery in Honolulu, Hawaii

Coordinates: 21°19′07″N 157°48′08″W

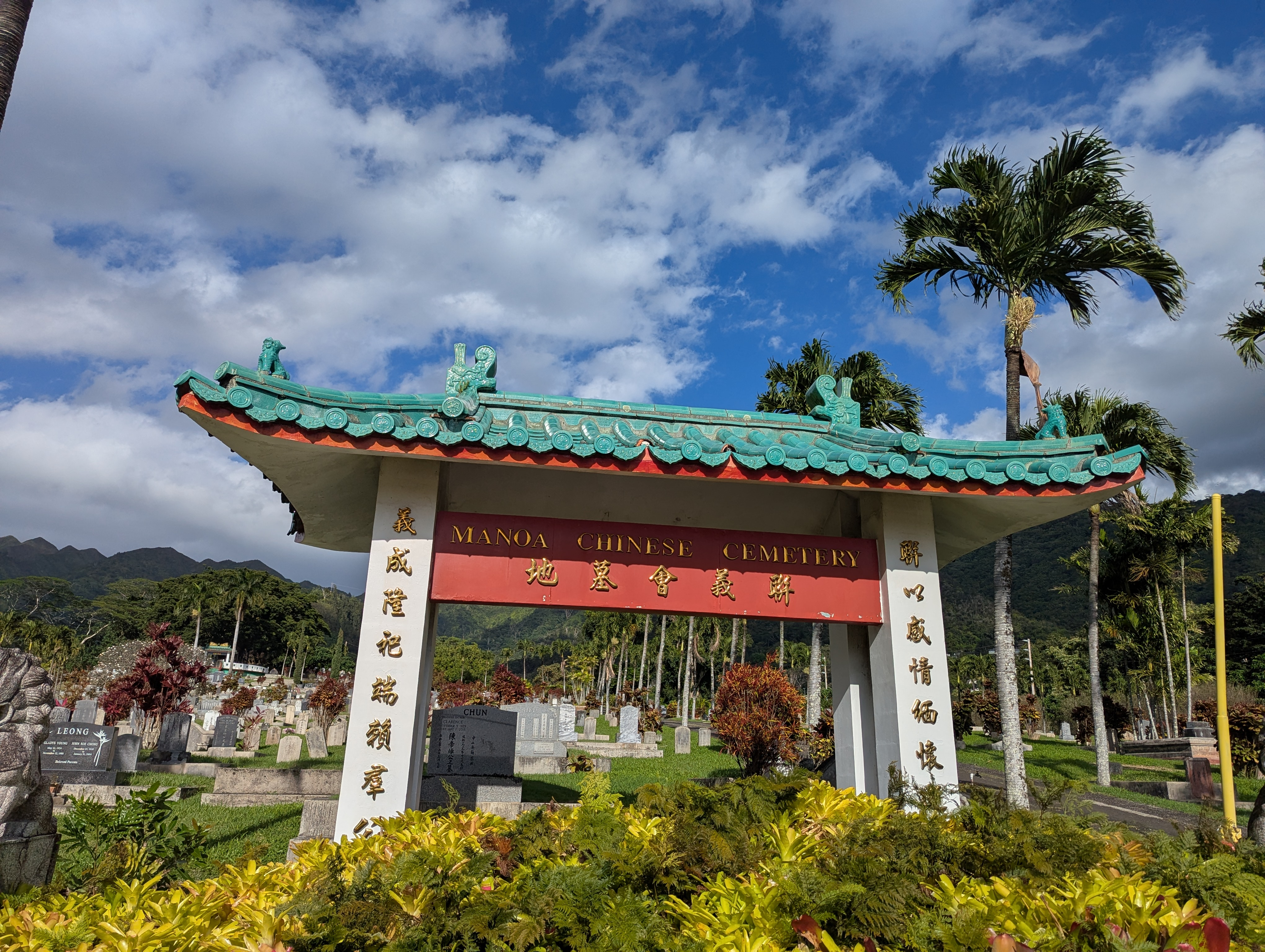
The cemetery gate

The Manoa Chinese Cemetery is a cemetery in Manoa, Honolulu, Hawaii.

== Notable burials ==
- Chang Apana (1871–1933), Honolulu Police Department detective and inspiration for the fictional character Charlie Chan
