= 1887 Constitution of the Hawaiian Kingdom =

Legal document drafted by anti-monarchists

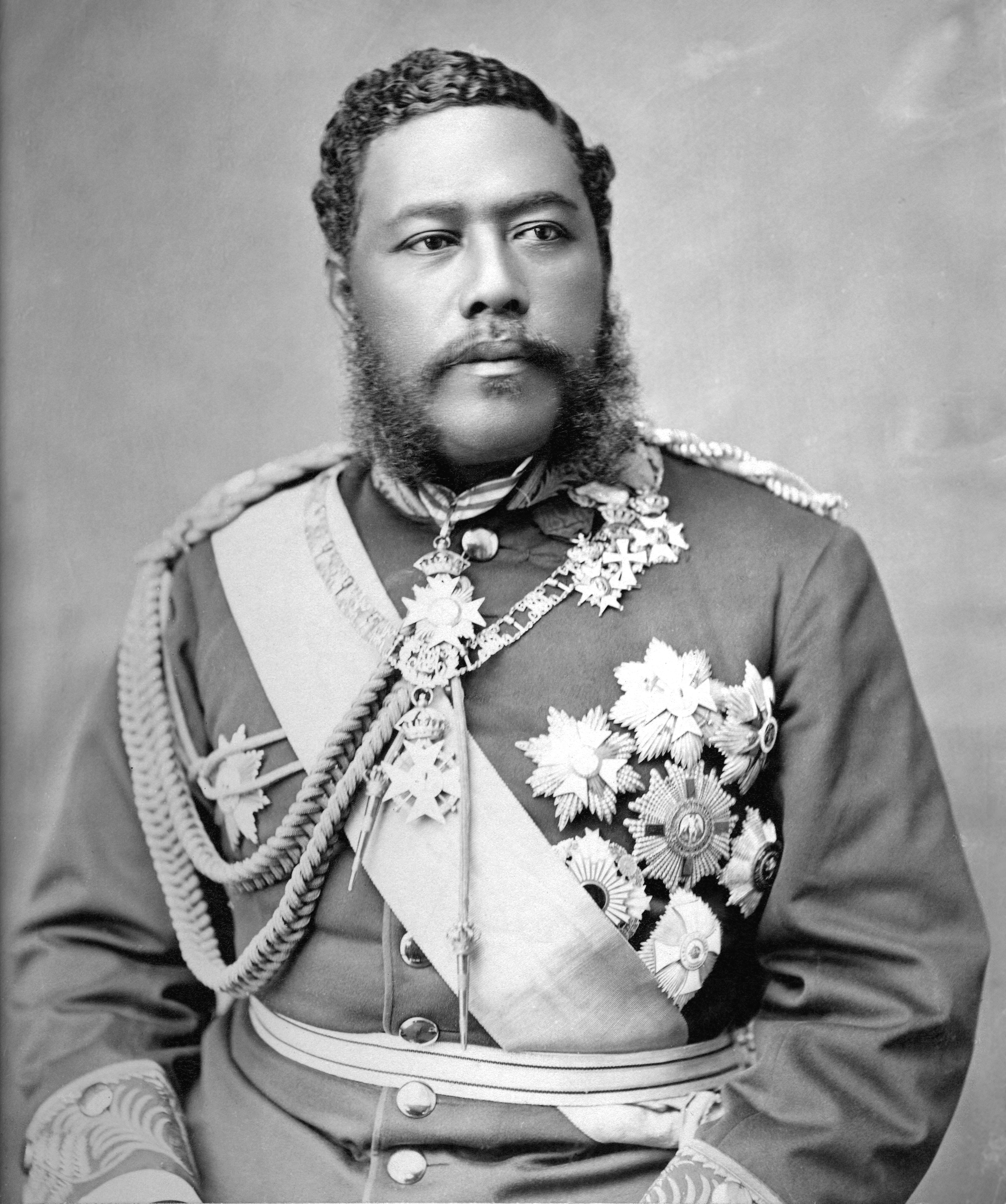
King David Kalākaua signed the 1887 Constitution under threat of deposition.

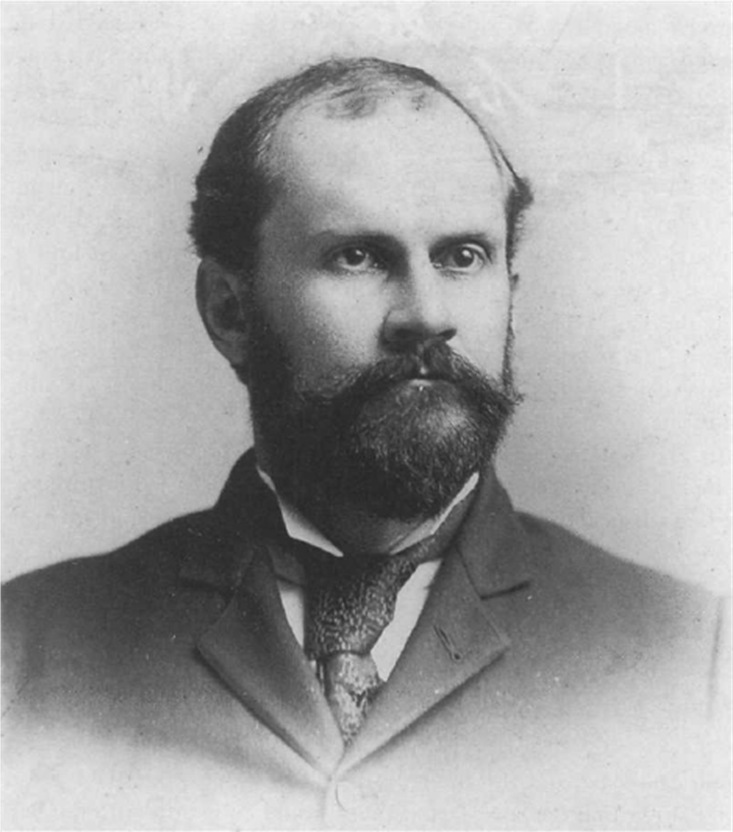
Lorrin A. Thurston was one of the constitution's writers.

The 1887 Constitution of the Hawaiian Kingdom was a legal document prepared by anti-monarchists to strip the absolute Hawaiian monarchy of much of its authority, initiating a transfer of power to a coalition of American, European and native Hawaiian people. It became known as the Bayonet Constitution for the rising by the armed militia which forced King Kalākaua to sign it or be deposed.

== Rebellion of 1887 ==
On June 30, 1887, a meeting of residents including the armed militia of the Honolulu Rifles, a group of soldiers that were secretly the Hawaiian League's military arm, and politicians who were members of the Reform Party of the Hawaiian Kingdom, demanded from King Kalākaua the dismissal of his Cabinet, headed by Walter M. Gibson. Their concerns about Gibson stemmed from the fact that he supported the king's authority.

The meeting was called to order by Sanford B. Dole (cousin of then 9-year-old James Dole) and chaired by Peter Cushman Jones, the president of the largest sugarcane plantation agency in Hawaii. The Hawaiian League and Americans had developed a vast majority of the Hawaiian Kingdom's wealth. Lorrin A. Thurston, the main instigator of the subsequent overthrow of the Hawaiian monarchy, prepared a list of demands to the king.

On the next morning, July 1, 1887, a shipment of arms was discovered from a neutral Australian ship (later found to be smooth-bore hunting guns used to scare birds from farmers' fields). The Honolulu Rifles took control and arrested and almost hanged Gibson. Kalākaua called in US Minister George W. Merrill, and the British, French, Portuguese, and Japanese representatives and requested help, but they all suggested that he should comply with any demands, which he did.

Thurston then became the powerful interior minister although Englishman William Lowthian Green was nominally head of the Cabinet as Minister of Finance. Gibson was later exiled to San Francisco.

Over less than a week, the new constitution was drafted by a group of lawyers, including Thurston, Dole, William Ansel Kinney, William Owen Smith, George Norton Wilcox, and Edward Griffin Hitchcock. All were also associated with the Hawaiian League, which had explicitly wanted the end of the kingdom and its annexation by the United States since its inception.

It stripped the king of most of his personal authority, empowering the legislature and cabinet of the government. It has since become widely known as the "Bayonet Constitution" because of the threat of force used to gain Kalākaua's cooperation. While Thurston and Dole denied this use of coercion and threats, Queen Liliuokalani asserted that Kalākaua's life was threatened: "He signed that constitution under absolute compulsion."

The new constitution was never ratified in the Hawaiian Kingdom's legislature.

== Provisions ==
The 1887 constitution followed modern liberal principles. It replaced the previous absolute veto, allowed to the king, to one that two-thirds of the legislature of the Hawaiian Kingdom could override.

It also took away the power of the king to act without the consent of his cabinet and gave the legislature the power to dismiss the cabinet instead of the king. It also removed language from the 1864 constitution implying that the king was above the law, replacing it with language that the king was required to obey his laws to the level of his subjects. The cabinet was now allowed to vote in the legislature, but to reduce the king's influence, he was not allowed to appoint legislators to any other government post. The legislature also gained the authority to imprison those that disrespected, published false reports or comments about or threatened or assaulted any of its members.

The constitution also removed the monarch's power to appoint members of the House of Nobles (the upper house of the legislature), instead making it a body elected by the wealthy landowners to six-year terms and enlarging it to 40 members. Qualifications to serve as a noble or representative now came to include high property and income requirements as well, which stripped almost all of the native population of the ability to serve in the legislature until they met the requirements.

The 1887 constitution had also attempted to limit profligate spending, which had become a problem under Kalākaua's reign, namely with the costly construction and maintenance of Iolani Palace. The constitution stipulated that the King was required to appoint a Minister of Finance to oversee government spending and submit an annual budget proposal to the legislature.

The 1887 constitution made significant changes to voting requirements. It allowed foreign resident aliens to vote, not just naturalized citizens. Asians, including subjects who previously enjoyed the right to vote, were specifically denied suffrage. Hawaiian, American, and European men were granted full voting rights only if they met the economic and literacy thresholds.

The 1864 constitution required that voters generate annual income of at least US$75 (equivalent to US$1544 in 2025) or own private property worth at least US$150 (equivalent to $3088 in 2025). The wealth requirements were removed during the short reign of Lunalilo in 1874. That change extended voter eligibility to many more Hawaiians and was kept for the lower house. The legislature still had little power, however, this being concentrated in the monarch.

The 1887 constitution required an income of $600 (equivalent to US$21500 in 2025) or taxable property of US$3000 (equivalent to $107500 in 2025) to vote for the upper house (or serve in it). That excluded an estimated two-thirds of the Hawaiian population. Disproportionately, it was white male residents, wealthy from the sugar industry, who retained suffrage with the Bayonet Constitution.

Allocating the government's power to the Cabinet and then promptly appointing their members to the Cabinet, and securing the disenfranchisement of their opposition, the Hawaiian League seized complete control over the Hawaiian Kingdom.

The Bayonet Constitution was the first great implement in the decline of the monarchy. Though it did not depose the King, it did place considerable limitations on his power.

== Native Hawaiian response ==
Immediately after the adoption of the Bayonet Constitution, the Native Hawaiian population of the Hawaiian Kingdom sought to restore King Kalākaua's power and authority. A committee of Hawaiians met with Kalākaua to discuss dismantling the constitution because the king signed it under duress. According to Thurston, Kalākaua even defended the constitution to protesting natives. Queen Liliuokalani affirmed that he was threatened with violence should he attempt to undo the new constitution. She also said there were several petitions from natives that asked for a new constitution to restore her absolute rule. Out of 9,500 registered voters, 6,500 signed the petitions. Based on this, Queen Liliuokalani proposed the removal of power from the legislature in January 1893, by a new constitution that would restore absolute monarchy. In response, the Hawaiian League overthrew her monarchy and the legislature took control of the country.

== See also ==
- Junius Kaʻae
- Tong Kee
