= Leper War on Kauaʻi =

Rebellion in Hawaii

- Part of Hawaiian rebellions (1887–1895)
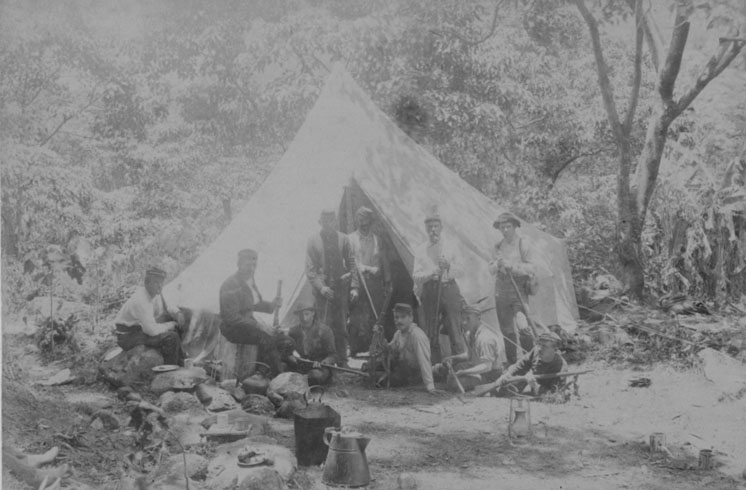
- Soldiers of the National Guard Auxiliary of the Provisional Government of Hawaii camped in Kalalau Valley.
| Date | July 1–13, 1893 |
| Location | Kalalau Valley, Kauaʻi |
| Result | Disputed; Pyrrhic victory for both sides: Leper colony collapses; Provisional Government withdraws |

Belligerents
| Kalaupapa Leprosy Settlement | Provisional Government of Hawaii |

Commanders and leaders
| Kapahei Kauai (POW) Kaluaikoolau | Sanford B. Dole; Edward G. Hitchcock; William O. Smith William Larsen |

Casualties and losses
| 27 captured | 3 killed |

The Leper War on Kauaʻi also known as the Koʻolau Rebellion, Battle of Kalalau, or the short name, the Leper War. Following the overthrow of the Hawaiian Kingdom, the stricter government enforced the 1865 "Act to Prevent the Spread of Leprosy" carried out by Attorney General and President of the Board of Health William Owen Smith. A revolt broke out in Kauaʻi, against the forced relocation of all infected by the disease to the Kalaupapa Leprosy Colony of Kalawao on the island of Molokai.

== Background ==
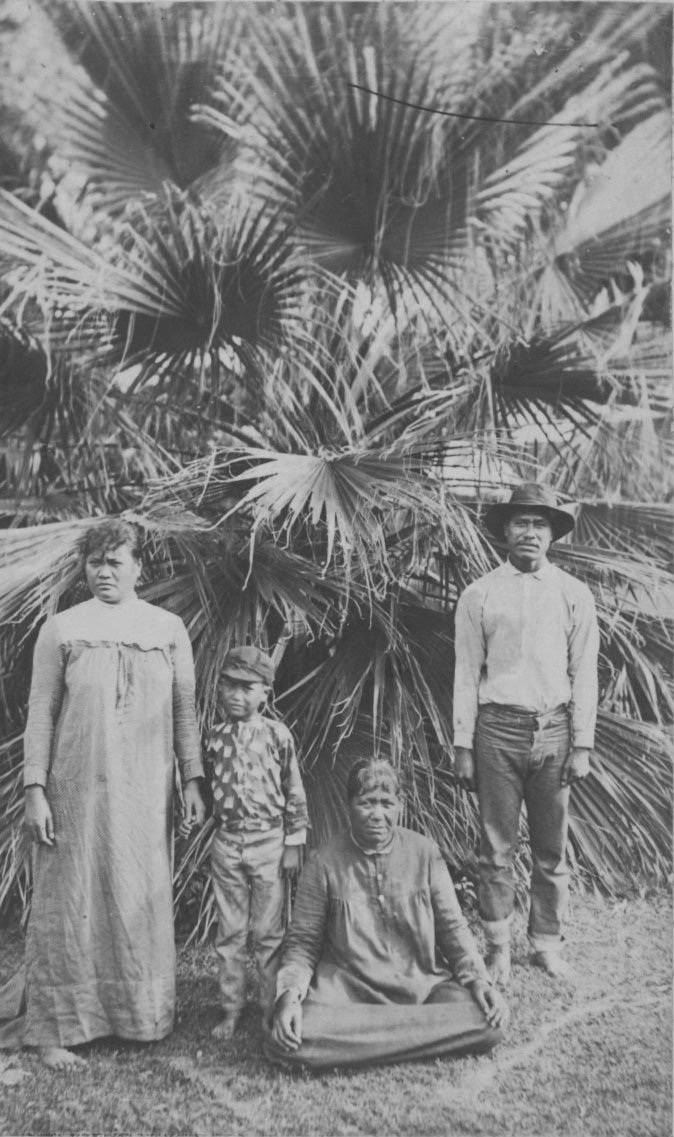
Kaluaikoʻolau and Piʻilani with their son, Kaleimanu, and Kaluaikoʻolau's mother, Kukui Kaleimanu.

The Leper War started when Louis H. Stoltz, a deputy sheriff, attempted to force an isolated leprosy colony in Kalalau Valley, Kauaʻi to be deported. He was shot and killed by a leper named Kaluaikoolau known as "Koʻolau" on June 27, 1893.

In an effort to preserve Hawaii's economy, the Republic of Hawaii decided to put in an effort to control leprosy. Their wish was to transfer anyone who had the disease to the island of Molokai and seclude them from the rest of the population. On June 24, 1893, Deputy Sheriff Louis H. Stolz, along with two other policemen by the names of Penikila and Peter Noland, sailed to Kalalau to enforce the quarantine law to relocate lepers to Kalaupapa. They stayed at the house of a resident on the coast of Kalalau. The policemen spent the next day devising a strategy for their task. On Monday, 26th, Stoltz's group ventured deep into the valley where they pitched a tent. Shortly after they established themselves a band of lepers led by Koʻolau seized the camp and chased the lawmen back to the coast. The following day Koʻolau intended to drive the sheriffs out of the valley. Koʻolau with his wife Piilani found Stoltz approaching the residence of a man named Kala. Stoltz had already arrested one man by the name of Paoa who was in handcuffs and was about to arrest Kala. Stoltz had Kala at gunpoint when Kala rushed to the door of his house and Koʻolau put Stoltz at his gunpoint in defense of Kala. According to Piilani, Koʻolau tripped in the process of maneuvering during the standoff. In the process of the stumble Koʻolau's rifle discharged wounding Stoltz. Paoa took the opportunity to pummel Stoltz utilizing his handcuffed wrists on the sheriff. Stoltz reclaimed his rifle and weakly got to his feet. Koʻolau fired once more dispatching Stoltz before he could bring his rifle to bear on his enemies.

== Kalalau expedition ==
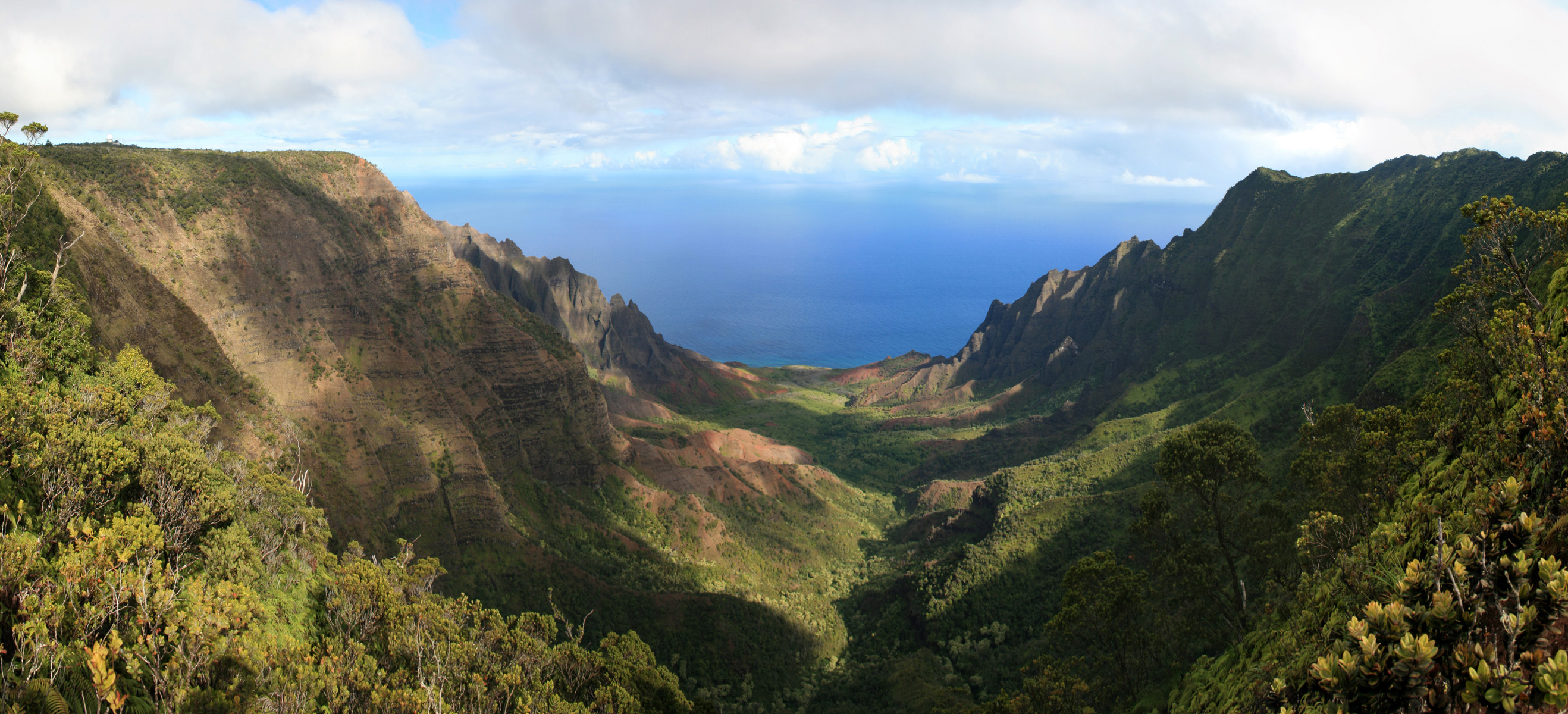
Kalalau Valley viewed from the Nā Pali Kona Forest Reserve Pihea Trail

The killing was received by President Sanford B. Dole as an offense to the new government. Following the killing, Marshal Edward G. Hitchcock dispatched the Kalalau expedition commanded by Captain William Larsen comprising a 35-man platoon from the National Guard of Hawaii, a 7cm howitzer, and representative of the Board of Health, Executive Officer Charles B. Reynolds. The men were transported to Kalalau by the Waialeale. They first stopped at Hanalei on June 30 to get information about the situation in Kalalau. They found that police were guarding the paths between Hanalei and Kalalau. At this point, they were informed of the proclaimed martial law that all lepers were to be imprisoned within 24 hours, and after this time is up, they were to be taken dead or alive if they had not yet complied.

Koʻolau was to lead a party of 12 armed with six rifles and six pistols. The party included himself, his son Kaleimanu, his wife Piilani being one of two women of the group, and Paoa. At the last moment Koʻolau decided to leave his group with the belief the party would be pursued more vigorously because of him. Piilani refused to go with the group and stayed with her husband despite his protests, Kaleimanu also went with Koʻolau to stay with his parents.

=== Landing ===
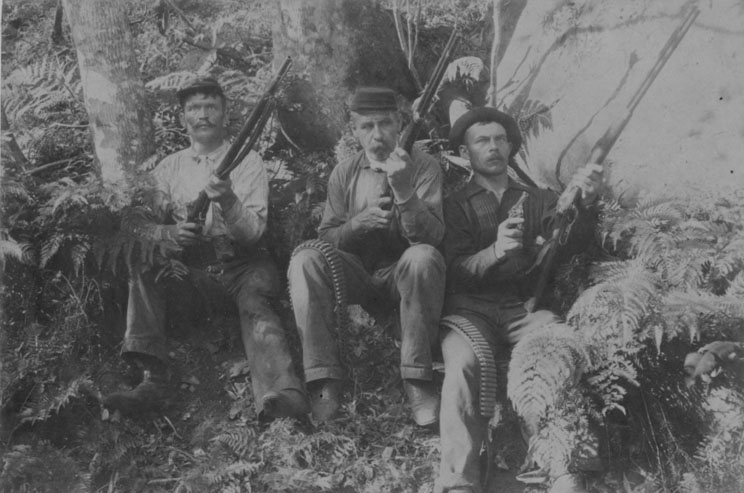
Soldiers of the Provisional Government

The Waialeale arrived at Kalalau July 1. Fifteen soldiers landed at noon in two skiffs without incident, only encountering civilians. Finding the shore safe the rest of the expedition was delivered and set up camp a mile inland. Soldiers were sent to guard the stream and the colony was searched finding leper leader Reverend Kapahei "Judge" Kauai, three lepers were captured from a cave on the coast and a leper collaborator.

On July 2, Wahinealoha, the collaborator, was deputized with the intent he would talk the lepers into surrender. The expedition moved another mile inland and established a base camp called "Camp Dole". Larsen fired five rounds from the howitzer against the eastern ridge of the valley with the intention of intimidating the lepers with the cannon's reports. The platoon advanced deeper into the valley. At noon, Wahinealoha returned with the message that a group of lepers were willing to surrender if Luther Wilcox were to meet with them. Wahinealoha, Kunuiakea, and Wicox met with a leper, after assuring well treatment the other eight lepers of Koʻolau's party came out of hiding and surrendered. The next day, the soldiers searched for Koʻolau around the east ridge of the valley. They used his sister as a way of capturing him; she was to call out to him and lure him out of his hiding place. This strategy failed because the valley was deserted and they did not find Koʻolau.

=== First assault ===
On July 4, Koʻolau was discovered by Sergeant Major J. W. Pratt's group of 15 men. Koʻolau was with his wife Piilani and son Kaleimanu in caves in the slope of one of the western ridge of the valley. Pratt sent a four-man assault team to the cave while the remainder provided cover fire. Koʻolau shot the point man Private John Anderson, a Norwegian, from the well-camouflaged ledge of the cave entrance as the team neared. After being shot, Anderson knocked two of his comrades off the mountain. He would die of his wound; the other two guardsmen survived their fall but Private Johnson was badly injured and the group withdrew back to Camp Dole.

That afternoon the Waialeale arrived in Honolulu with 15 lepers.

Manuia led a group of four other lepers to Hanalei, but were caught near Haena and sent to Hanalei.

=== Second assault ===
On July 5, Larsen commanded the second assault himself with 15 men. They found the body of Anderson. Larsen had one group commanded by him to provide fifteen minutes of suppressive fire on the cave while an assault group, commanded by Reynolds, entered the cave. This time the point man was a combat veteran of the American Civil War, Private John McCabe who served in the Union Army. McCabe led the assault group up to the entrance of the cave. As he attempted to climb over the ledge to the entrance of the cave, Ko'olau shot him in his chin and the bullet went through his brain. Once again the group retreated, but during the withdrawal, Private John Herschberg snagged his rifle on foliage and the gun went off killing him. The soldiers returned to camp with the three bodies. On July 6, Pratt commanded an artillery barrage of the leper's position with the howitzer and the guardsmen moved on with their hunt for lepers. Unbeknownst to them Koʻolau and his family fled the cave during the night before the bombardment.

On July 7, Reynolds with six soldiers collected ten lepers at Hanalei that had been caught outside Kalalau aboard the Iwalani and sent them to Honolulu.

=== Third assault ===
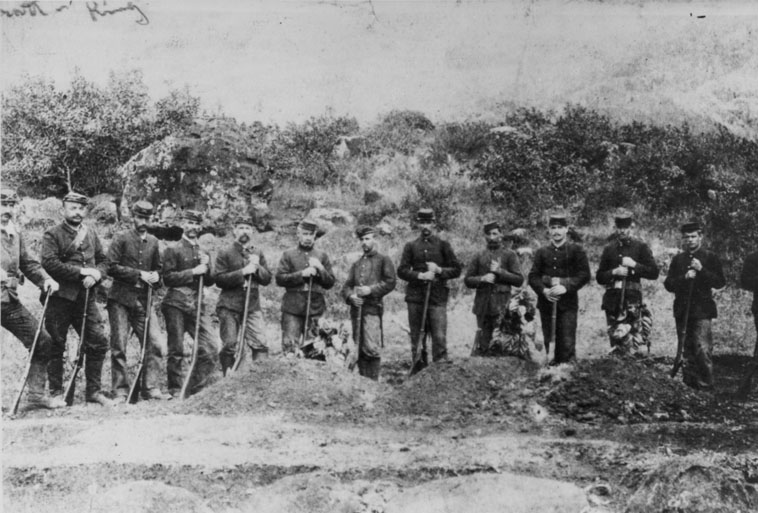
Soldiers burying the three dead bodies.

William Owen Smith from the Board of Health found the war embarrassing and went to Kalalau himself aboard the Iwalani that had delivered the prisoners to Honolulu and was to return to Kalalau. Smith arrived on July 10 with ten fresh soldiers, supplies, and three coffins. Smith found Larsen had given up on Koʻolau and went to the next valley with his men, searching for lepers. After hours of argument between the two, they returned to the cave with men to find it abandoned. Patrols were sent into the surrounding area to no avail. Smith, seeing the dense vegetation for himself, decided the manhunt was in vain and called off Larsen's campaign.

== Aftermath ==
The soldiers left boarded the Iwalani, the campaign had captured twenty seven prisoners. The remaining lepers were never harassed again, while the captured lepers were sent to Kalawao. The leper community in Kalalau had dissolved and lived in individual households. Koʻolau and his family remained unharmed, yet still fearful of being captured, staying in the original valley in which they were hiding for many more years until the first son and Koʻolau died. Piilani, Koʻolau's wife, left the valley following their deaths and shared her story which was later published. In 1897, William Smith's brother physician Jared K. Smith was killed in what was suspected as retaliation by a relative of lepers who were threatened with deportation. Smith's law partner William Ansel Kinney was sent as special prosecutor. A native Hawaiian named Kapea was arrested, tried, and hanged for the murder.

== Popular culture ==
The Leper War has been cited as a successful act of defiance directed at discrimination toward leprosy and Hawaiians.

Piilani wrote about her experience which was published in 1906 titled Ka Moolelo oiaio o Kaluaikoolau, Hawaiian for The True Story of Kaluaikoolau.

The event would inspire the narrative The Folding Cliffs by W. S. Merwin.

Jack London wrote a short story about the incident titled "Koolau the Leper".

Carlos Giménez adapted Jack London's short story Koolau the Leper into a comic titled Koolau el leproso. According to his biography, Giménez began the adaptation in 1978 and it was published from 1979 in the magazine Totem before later appearing in collected form.

In 2022, a feature film about the rebellion called The Wind & the Reckoning was released.
