= The Wind & the Reckoning =

- Directed by: David L. Cunningham
- Written by: John Fusco
- Based on: Ka Moʻolelo ʻoiaʻiʻo o Kaluaikoʻolau by Piʻilani
- Produced by: Dale Armin Johnson
- Starring: Jason Scott Lee; Johnathon Schaech; Ron Yuan
- Cinematography: Scott Lee Mason
- Release date: November 4, 2022 (Hawaii)
- Country: United States
- Languages: Hawaiian; English

The Wind & the Reckoning is an American Hawaiian Western historical drama film produced and directed by David L. Cunningham. The film is "a story inspired by real-life events" that are known as the Koʻolau Rebellion in Hawaiʻi, particularly a 1906 Hawaiian-written account by Piʻilani, the wife of one of its combatants.

The film had a limited released on November 4, 2022 in Hawaiʻi before playing in the mainland United States.

== Plot ==
The film is set in 1893 on Kauaʻi, after the overthrow of the Kingdom of Hawaiʻi. As an outbreak of leprosy engulfs the island, the new government orders all Native Hawaiians suspected of having the disease banished permanently to the Kalaupapa Leprosy Colony on the island of Molokaʻi that is known as 'the island of the living grave'. When a local cowboy named Koʻolau (Jason Scott Lee) and his young son Kalei (Kahiau Perreira) contract the disease, they refuse to allow their family to be separated, sparking an armed clash with the white island authorities. The film is based on real-life historical events as told through the memoirs of Piʻilani published in 1906, titled Ka Moʻolelo ʻoiaʻiʻo o Kaluaikoʻolau (The True Story of Kaluaikoʻolau).

== Cast ==
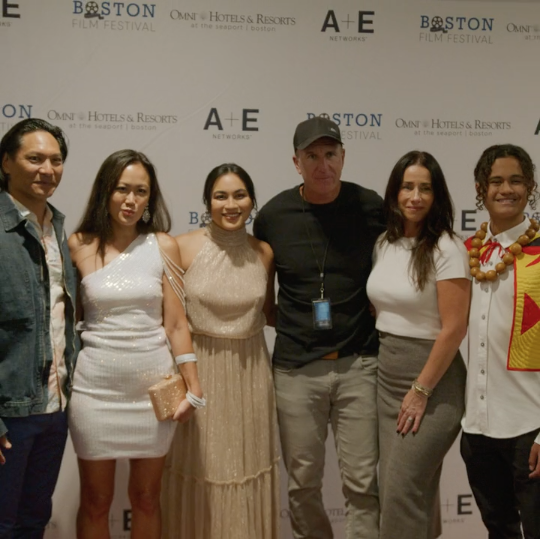
Boston Film Festival

- Jason Scott Lee as Koʻolau
- Lindsay Watson as Piʻilani
- Kahiau Perreira as Kaleimanu
- Johnathon Schaech as Marshall Hitchcock
- Henry Ian Cusick as McCabe
- Lance Kerwin as Anderson
- Matt Corboy as Sheriff Stoltz
- Ron Yuan as Lee
- Sisa Grey as Patch
- Nick Masciangelo as Babcock
- Kelemete Misipeka as Kapahei "Judge" Kauai
- Alex Farnham as Henriquez
- Mark Medeiros as Kamu
- Patrick Gilbert as Eben Sinclair
- Stuart Featheran as Paoa
- Hoku Pavao as Keawe
- Winton Nicholson as Sgt. Grimes
- Joel Angyal as Bounty Hunter

== Production ==
The film is spoken primarily in Hawaiian and subtitled in English, which makes it one of the first Hawaiian language films with an international distribution. For cultural and linguistic accuracy, Hawaiian cultural experts were called upon, including Leināʻala Fruean, Kumu Kaʻea Lyons, Kumu Kauhane Heloca, and Kumu Naʻauao Viva.

The cultural experts helped translate the script by John Fusco into Hawaiian. They worked with the cast to teach them the language, and they were on set giving notes while filming. The cultural experts also ensured the costumes were accurate, using historical photographers for inspiration.

The film was shot in late 2020. Due to the COVID-19 pandemic, the film's crew and cast were sequestered on a 50-acre (20 ha) ranch on the island of Hawaiʻi. This was the final film appearance of Lance Kerwin.

== Release ==
The Wind & the Reckoning had its world premiere at the Boston Film Festival on September 24, 2022 where it won Best Film. The film also won the Kumeyaay Award and the Audience Choice Best Feature Film award at the San Diego International Film Festival.

== Reception ==
The film has a 50% rating at Rotten Tomatoes. The New York Times found the film "too self-contained and the characters too one-note" and said "the film does not carry the emotional punch that the subject matter warrants."
