= Royal Guards of Hawaii =

Ceremonial unit of the Hawaii Air National Guard

Royal Guard of the Hawaii National Guard
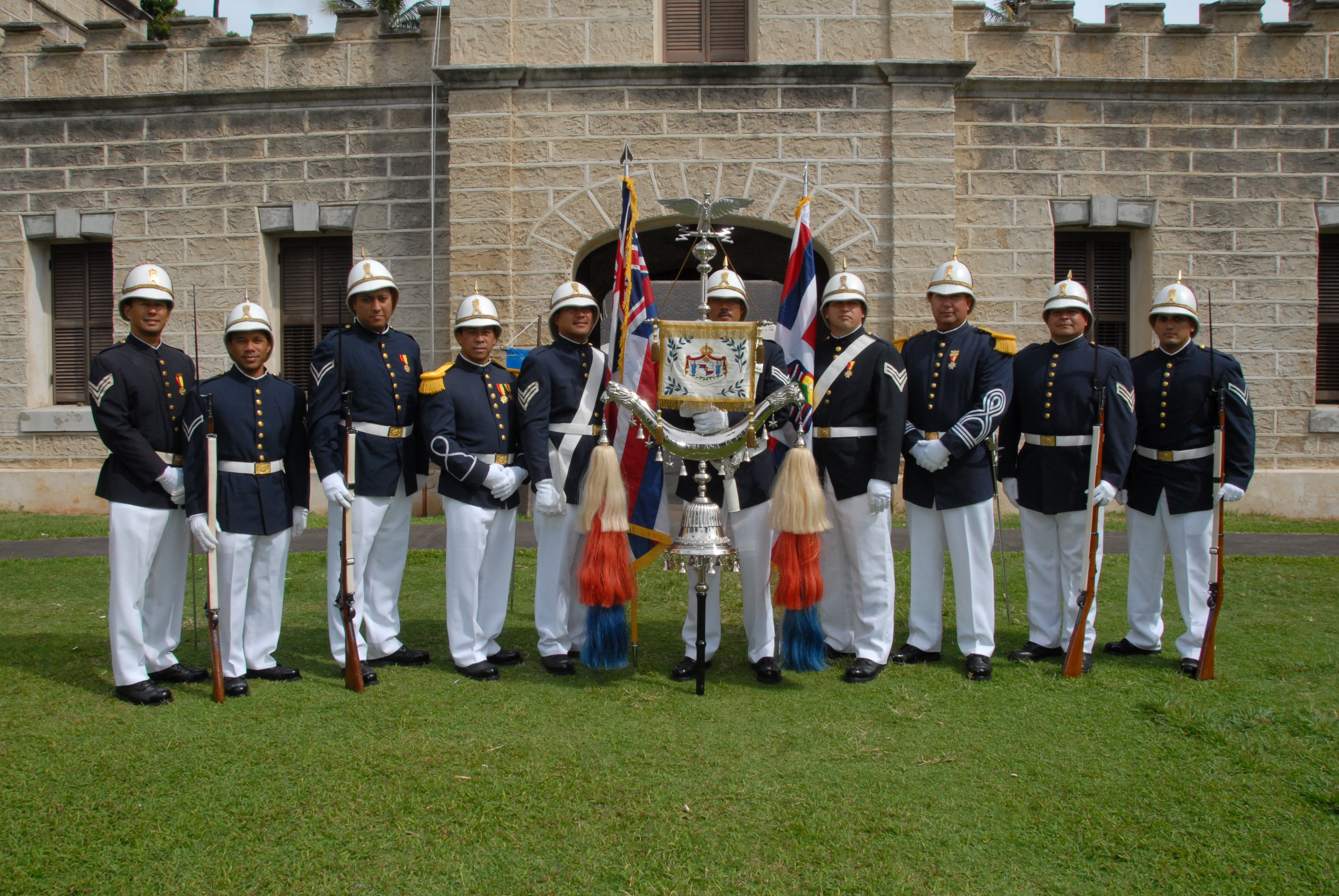
- The Royal Guards group photo outside ʻIolani Barracks, 2011.
- Active: 1854–1873; 1874–1893; 1963–present
- Country: Hawaii; United States
- Allegiance: Hawaiian Kingdom; State of Hawaii
- Branch: Air National Guard
- Type: Honor guard (current)
- Size: 42; 75 (1884)
- Part of: Hawaii Air National Guard
- Motto: “Ua Mau ke Ea o ka ʻĀina i ka Pono”
- Anniversaries: Birthday of David Kalākaua
- Engagements: 1868 Kaona uprising 1873 Barracks Revolt; Rebellion of 1887; Rebellion of 1888; Rebellion of 1889; Rebellion of 1893

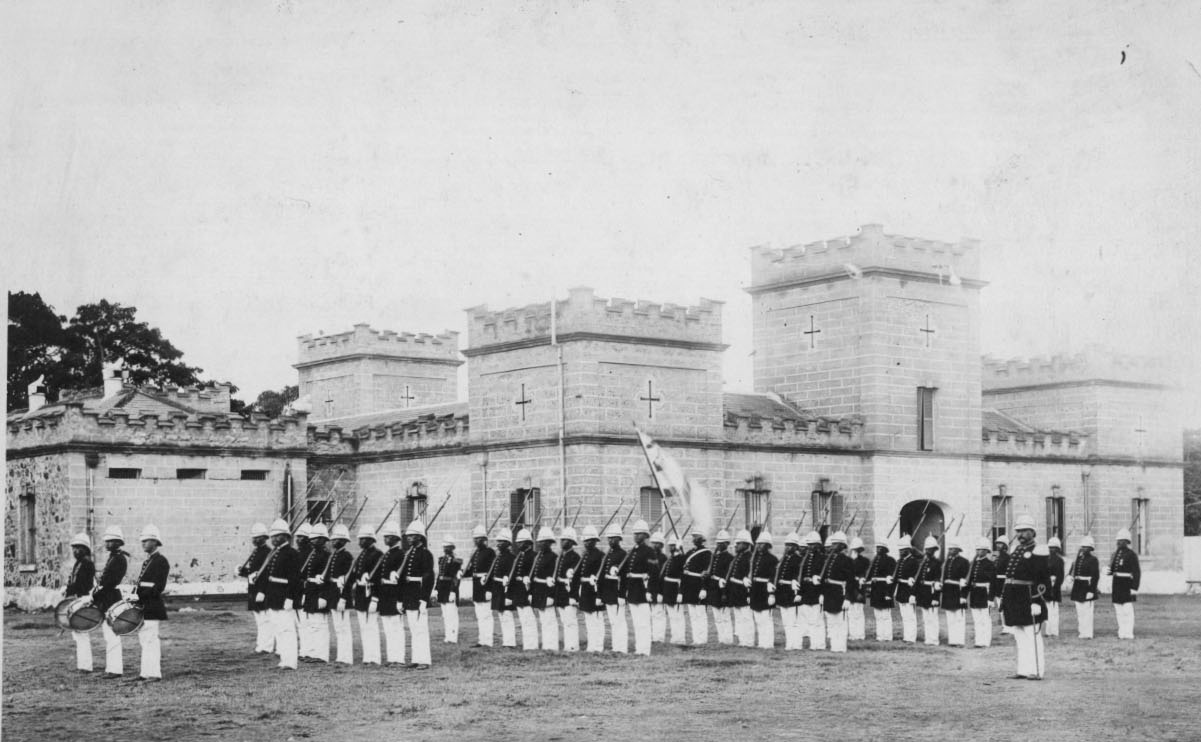
The Royal Guards at ʻIolani Barracks.

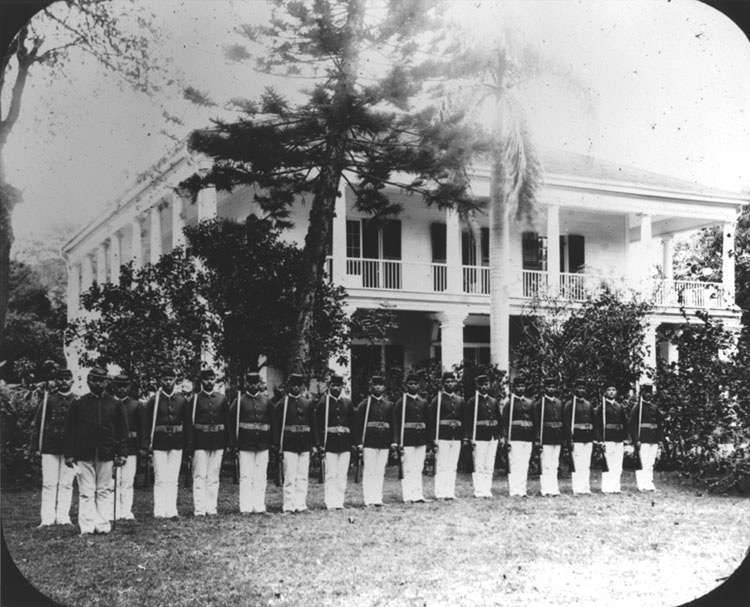
The Royal Guards at Washington Place.

The Royal Guard of the Hawaii National Guard is an Air National Guard ceremonial unit which is uniformed in a manner similar to the royal bodyguard of the Hawaiian Kingdom of the late 19th century.

The last remaining Royal Guard unit of Hawaiian Kingdom was abolished after the monarchy fell during the overthrow of the Hawaiian Kingdom at the end of the 19th century.

== Original Royal Guard ==
Under the reforms of King Kamehameha III's reign, Hawaii's standing army would be reduced from a battalion sized force to little more than a single company, assigned to guard the sovereign, the treasury, and for ceremonial duties, with further companies limited to volunteer reserve status to be mustered as necessary.

The remaining Royal Guard, also known as the King’s Guard (or Queen's Guard, depending on the reigning monarch) and the Household Troops were established in 1854. One of the first ceremonial events the guard participated in was the 1854 funeral procession of King Kamehameha III, which featured the guard and other military companies, such as the Royal Hawaiian Band and the volunteer haole First Hawaiian Guard.

In 1873, under the reign of King Lunalilo, the Royal Guard was disbanded after a mutiny occurred concerning the strict treatment of the soldiers under their haole captain, Joseph Jajczay.

=== Reestablishment ===
Lunalilo would die the next year, and the Royal Guard was reestablished as an elite, all native force of 60 men following the ascension of King David Kalākaua.

In 1884, Robert Hoapili Baker, referencing the small scale of the guard and its inability to properly defend the nation, reported the conditions of the state of the guard and the military of the kingdom, and that while they were well capable of performing their duties as a trained force; though they only had so far been involved in a riot at an immigration depot in 1883 and were in poor condition:

“It is to be regretted that an institution such as this [Military], which ought to be considered as one of the fundamental institutions of the Government, should be allowed to remain inoperative and in a condition discreditable to a nation ranking on a political scale and influence with other powers, but unable to provide for its own safety…”

In 1885, the guard participated in Queen Emma's funeral procession, during which they introduced the uniforms they're now associated with. Also in attendance were the newly-formed Honolulu Rifles and other volunteer companies.

Following the overthrow of the Hawaiian Kingdom, most of what remained of Hawaii's standing and volunteer native forces were disbanded on January 18, 1893, their duties taken over by U.S. forces. For a brief period, the Provisional Government of Hawaii kept a small Royal Guard unit left to protect Queen Lili‘uokalani at Washington Place, though it too was soon disbanded on February 28, 1893.

== Current Royal Guard ==
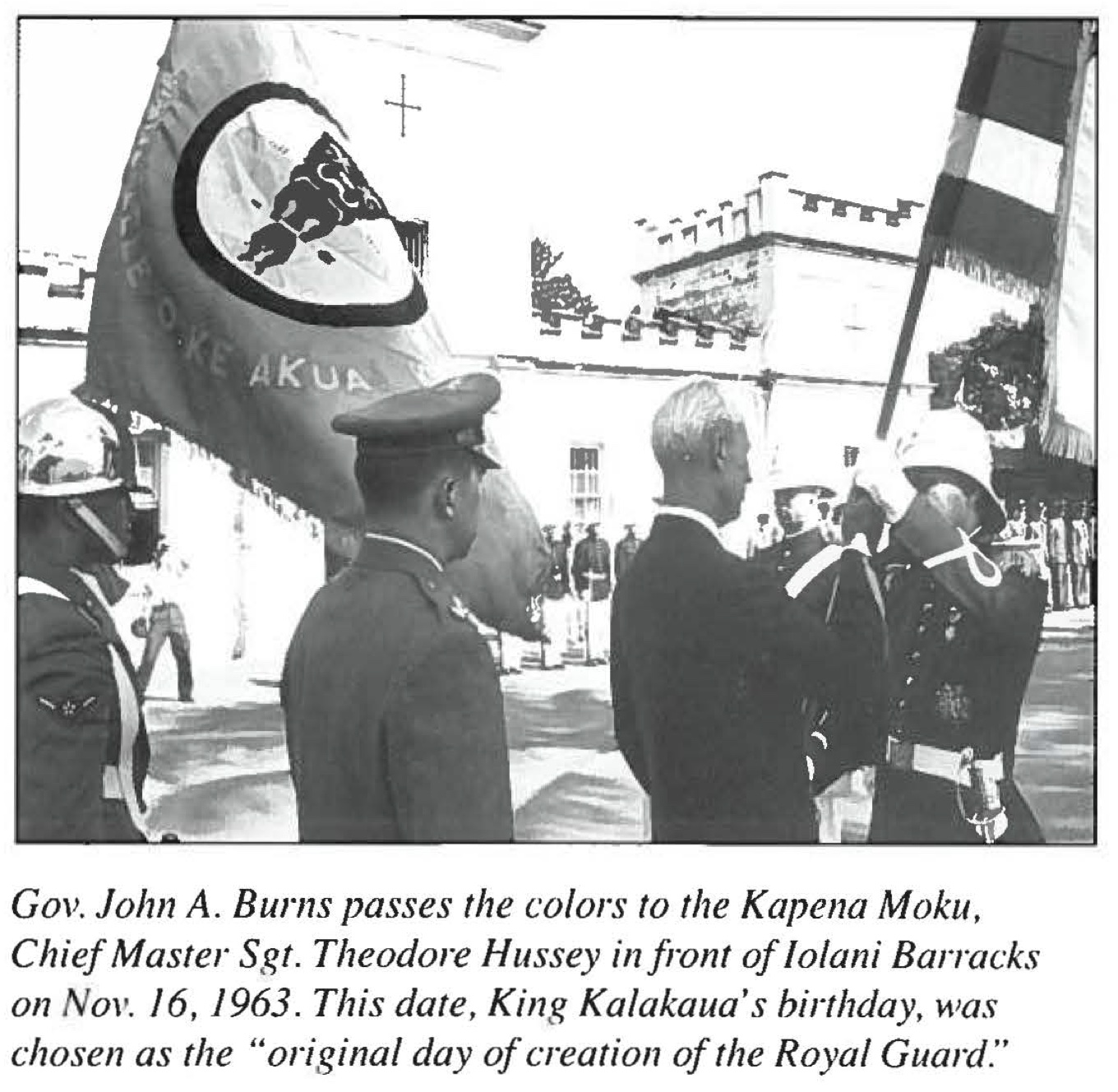

Following Hawaii's admission as a U.S. state, Colonel Walter Judd, a descendant of Gerrit P. Judd, sought to create a volunteer ceremonial unit to honor and inspire Native Hawaiian members of the Hawaii Air National Guard. The unit that would become the Royal Guard was modeled after King David Kalākaua’s personal guard that his grand-uncle Col Charles Hastings Judd served as Adjutant general of.

Col Judd stood up the unit with Chief Master Sgt Theodore Hussey as the first Kapena Moku overseeing a single squad of 14 men, receiving the unit colors from Governor John A. Burns at Iolani Palace on 16 November 1963. The date was chosen to coincide with King Kalākaua's birthday, where they stand a ceremonial guard at the Palace during the annual celebrations.

With a mandate to preserve historical ties to Hawaii's rich heritage, the unit is now a platoon of 42 men, composed of members of the Hawaii Air National Guard of full or partial Native Hawaiian descent. The unit's members maintain period correct uniforms and call commands during their drill and ceremony in ʻŌlelo Hawaiʻi. They carry the State of Hawaii's colors in support of the Governor and the Hawaii National Guard at official state and other ceremonial functions.

The current unit has marched in four Presidential Parades in Washington, D.C., and has participated in countless State and community functions (including the annual Aloha Week Festivals Parade) throughout its now 60-year history.

=== Ranks ===
The current composition of the Royal Guard is organized as one platoon of 4 squads, divided as follows:

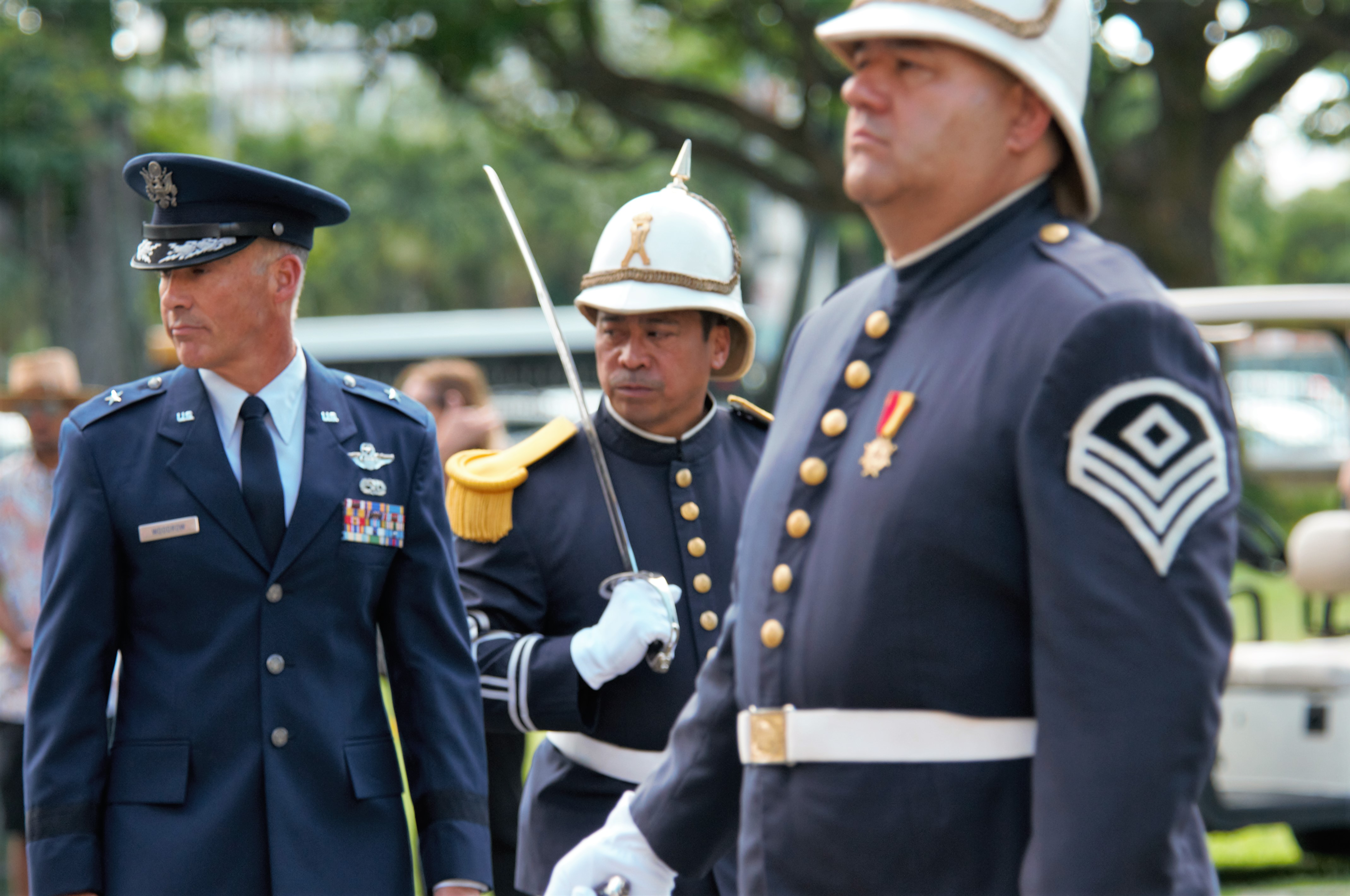
HIANG Brig Gen Gregory Woodrow inspects the Royal Guard with Kapena Moku Darrell Bactad in 2017.

- Kapena Moku (Captain)
- Luna Koa (1st Lieutenant)
- Lutanela (2nd Lieutenant)
- He Kakiana (First Sergeant)
- Kakiana Ekahi (Sergeant 1st Squad)
- Kakiana Elua (Sergeant 2nd Squad)
- Kakiana Ekolu (Sergeant 3rd Squad)
- Kakiana Eha (Sergeant 4th Squad)
- Kaiana Pu (Ordnance Sergeant)
- Kapala Ekahi (Corporal 1st Squad)
- Kopala Elua (Corporal 2nd Squad)
- Kopala Ekolu (Corporal 3rd Squad)
- Kopala Eha (Corporal 4th Squad)
- Kopala Hae (Color Guard Corporal)
- 1 Hookani Pahu (Drummer)
- 27 Koa (Soldiers)

== Uniform ==
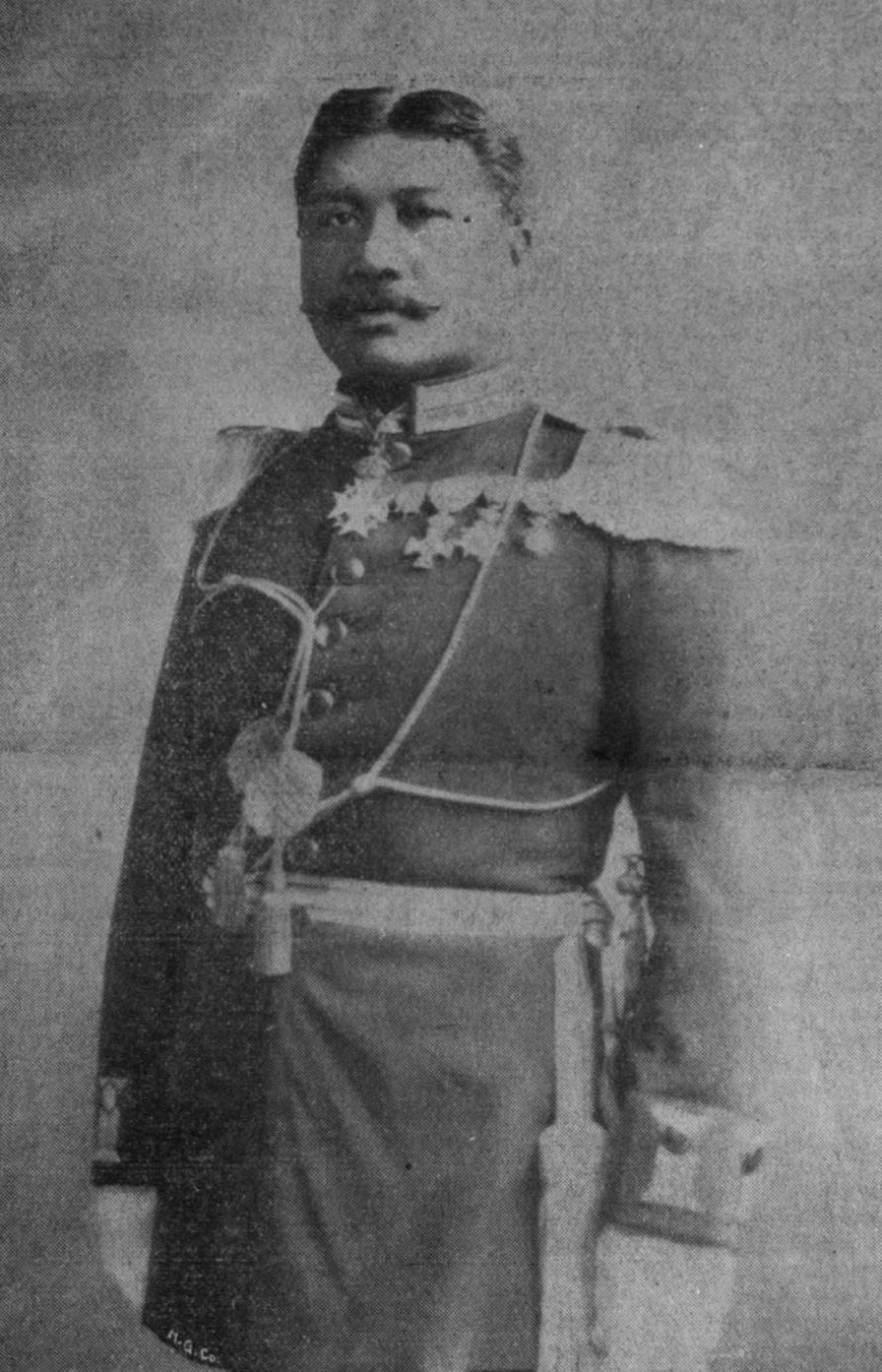
Robert Hoapili Baker, Lieutenant of the King's Guard.

The uniform of the Royal Guard prior to the 1880s is mostly unknown due to the lack of photographs and scarce documentation. However, after the 1880s, enlistees of the guard are seen wearing a dark blue service dress tunic and a white spiked cork pith helmet during formal occasions. Officers in the guard during the reign of Kalākaua often wore double-breasted tunics with a spiked pith helmet and plume during formal occasions. Enlisted soldiers wore undress white uniforms with a peaked cap (early 1880s) or a Glengarry bonnet during non-formal occasions. Before the uniform changes in 1885, the guard wore Prussian pickelhaubes.

The Royal Guard's historical uniform and helmet represent the Hawaii National Guard at the National Guard Heritage Room at Joint Base Fort Myer-Henderson Hall in Virginia, and are currently the only unit in the U.S. Military authorized to wear a pith helmet.

== Weapons ==
- Springfield 45-70 rifles
- Winchester 45-75 Muskets
- 8cm & 7cm Uchatius Field and Mountain guns
- Gatling gun
