= Hawaiian News Company =

The Hawaiian News Company was a printer, publisher and bookbinder in Hawaii. It had offices in Honolulu in the Young Building on Bishop Street, and on Merchant Street. It was the only representative in Hawaii of the American Type Founders Company. The company provided services, such as book binding, and sold products, such as printing devices. It carried paper stock for billheads, noteheads, commercial bond, news, cover, book, cardboard, as well as envelopes, society stationery and cards. New books arrived by steamer. The magazine and general news department carried a variety of titles, with subscriptions available for magazines published in the United States, Canada or Europe. In addition, the company sold musical instruments, sheet music, and records.

John Harris Soper arrived in Honolulu in 1886 and acquired the business of J.M. Oat, Jr. & Co., a stationery store and newspaper company, which he incorporated as the Hawaiian News Company on August 1, 1891, becoming its president. In 1897, his son, John Frederick, became the company manager. In 1920, the company merged with Thrum's Limited, becoming Hawaiian News and Thrum's Limited. Five years later, it became the Honolulu Paper Company.
