= ʻIolani Barracks =

- Iolani Barracks
- U.S. Historic district – Contributing property
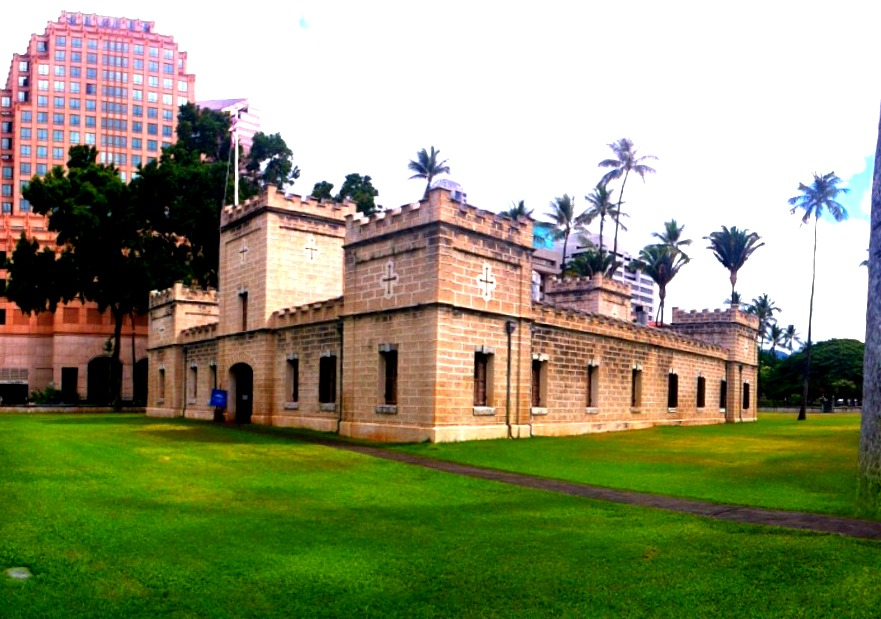
- ʻIolani Barracks

- Location within Hawaii
- Location: Hawaii State Capitol grounds, Honolulu, Hawaii
- Coordinates: 21°18′27″N 157°51′32″W
- Built: 1870
- Architect: Theodore Heuck
- Part of: Hawaii Capital Historic District (ID78001020)
- Added to NRHP: 1 December 1978

ʻIolani Barracks, or hale koa (house [of] warriors) in Hawaiian, was built in 1870, designed by the architect Theodore Heuck, under the direction of King Lot Kapuaiwa. Located directly adjacent to ʻIolani Palace in downtown Honolulu, it housed about 80 members of the monarch's Royal Guard until the overthrow of the Monarchy in 1893. It was added to the National Register of Historic Places in 1978 as part of the Hawaii Capital Historic District.

== Design ==
The structure clearly hearkens to the architecture of medieval castles of Europe with its crenelated parapets and towers. It was constructed with 4,000 coral block walls from the same limestone source used to build Kawaiahaʻo Church and the Cathedral of Our Lady of Peace and has a slate roof. It is surrounded by rooms once used by the guards as a mess hall, kitchen, dispensary, berth room, and lockup. ʻIolani Barracks was originally built a block behind (mauka, or inland of) ʻIolani Palace, where the Chiefs Children's School used to situate.

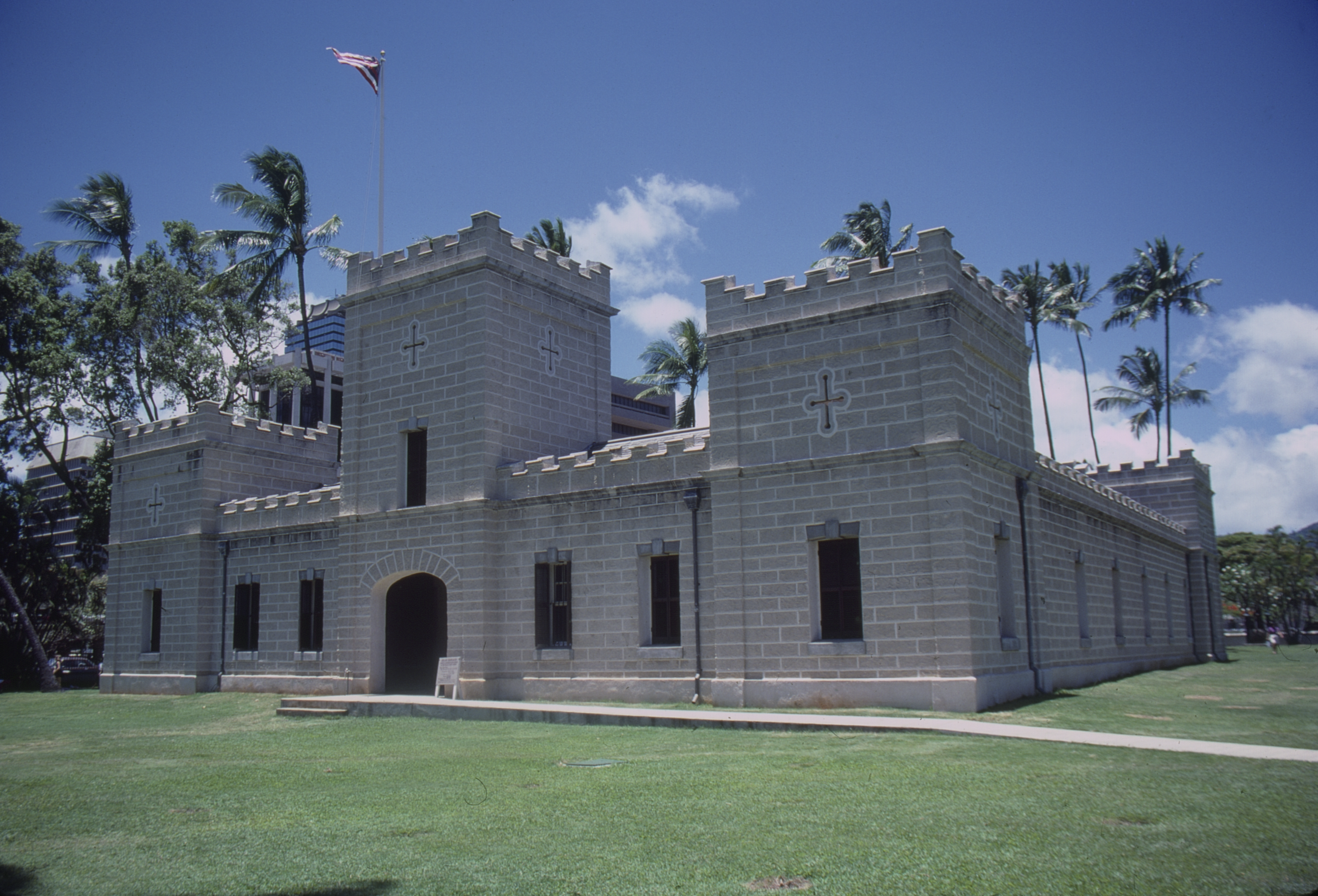
Facade of barracks at Iolani Palace. Photograph by Alan Gowans. National Gallery of Art Library.

== 1873 Barracks Revolt ==
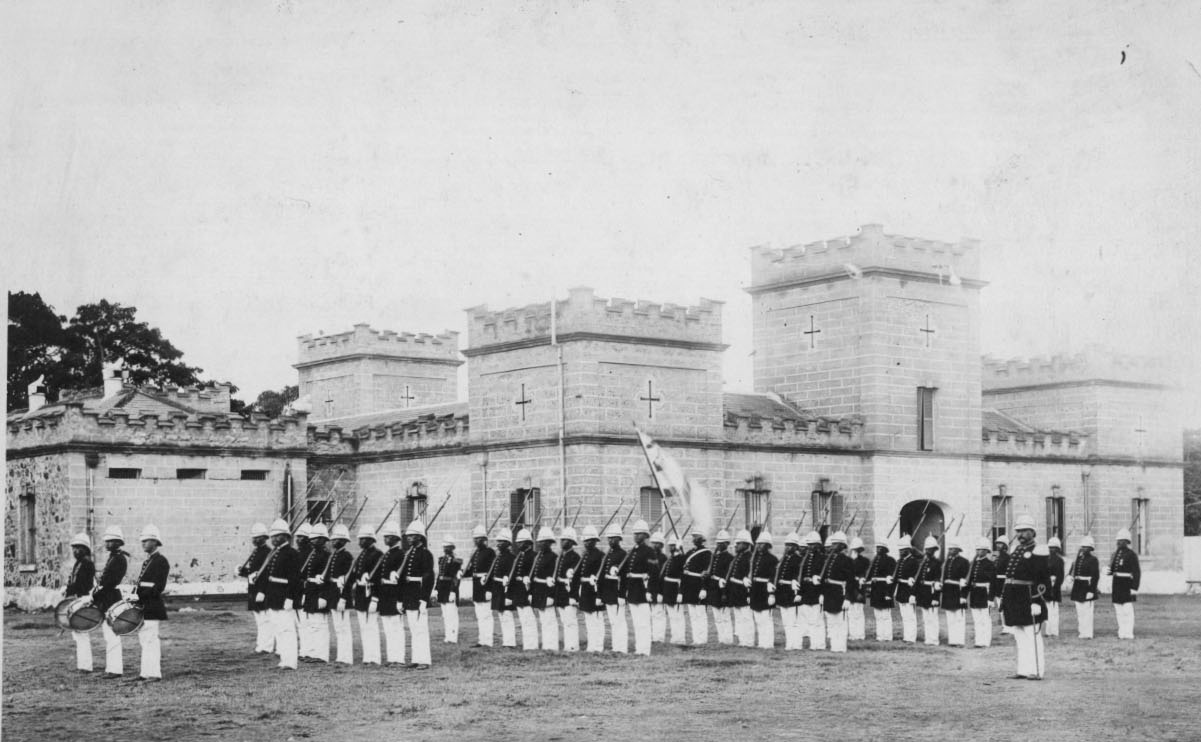
The Royal Guards in front of ʻIolani Barracks.

On September 6, 1873, growing tensions between the enlisted men and the officers resulted in a mutiny after the Hungarian Captain Joseph Jajczay sent four men to the brig for deserting their post guarding the treasury. On the 6th, Jajczay returned from church to the barracks and was attacked by his own soldiers and the prisoners. When Adjutant General Charles Hastings Judd tried to calm the situation he was also attacked. The mutineers took control of the ʻIolani Barracks and later retrieved and loaded two cannons from near the palace. Authorities decided to wait out the mutiny by surrounding the barracks, but did not attack. On the 9th, King Lunalilo interviewed the mutineers and issued an offer to them; 13 agreed and surrendered. The Hungarian-born Jajczay was replaced by native Hawaiian Major William Luther Moehonua.

On the 12th, the 24 remaining mutineers agreed to another offer by the king granting full amnesty to end the mutiny. After this revolt, Lunalilo disbanded the Hawaiian Army; it was not restored until King Kalākaua came to power.

== Post-Monarchy ==
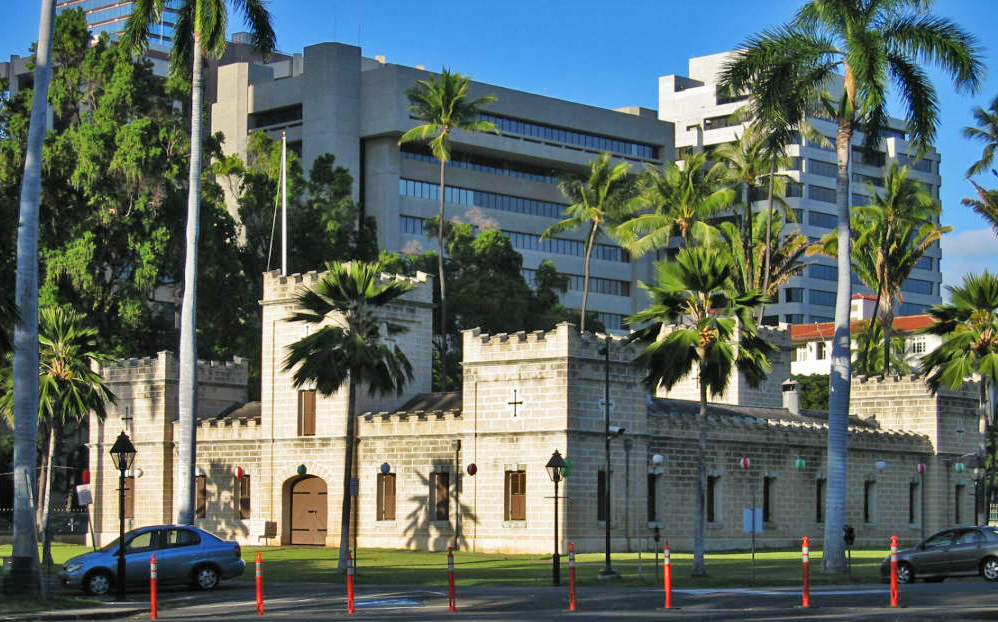
ʻIolani today

After the overthrow of the Hawaiian monarchy in 1893, the Royal Guard were paid their month's salary and disbanded. The barracks was used on several occasions as the headquarters of the National Guard of Hawaiʻi. The building was used as temporary shelter for victims of the 1899 Chinatown fire. It also housed government offices and at one point served as a warehouse.

In 1965, the structure was moved, stone by stone, to its current location to make room for the Hawaiʻi State Capitol. Today, the building serves as a visitors center for ʻIolani Palace and houses a gift shop, ticket office, video theater, and membership office.
