= John Harris Soper =

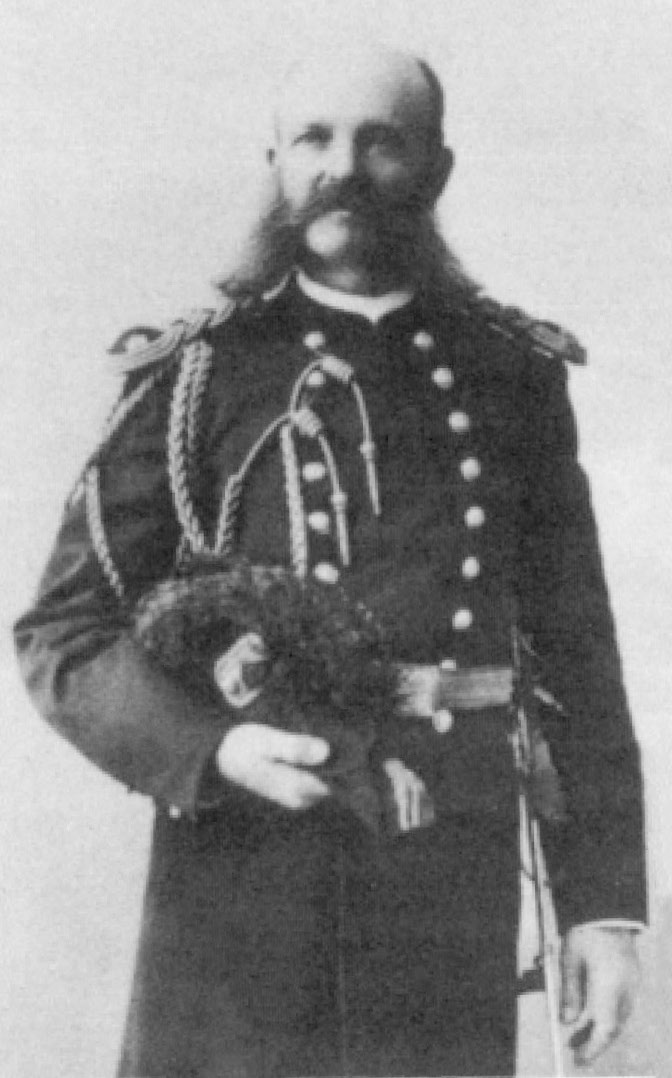
John Harris Soper

John Harris Soper (1846–1944) was Marshal of the Kingdom of Hawaii during the period of 1884-86 and 1888-90. He was born November 17, 1846, in Plymouth, Devon, England to Thomas Harris Soper and Mary Kipling Soper. A military man, he became Commander-in-chief of military forces of the Provisional Government of Hawaii in 1893; Adjutant General and Chief of Staff during the period of 1894-1907; and retired as Brigadier General of the National Guard of Hawaii in 1907, having previously served in the California National Guard. Also a businessman, he was President of Hawaiian News Company in Honolulu; and also managed Soper, Wright & Company, a sugar plantation, on ʻŌʻōkala, Hawaii. He served as honorary vice-president of the Societe des Sauveteurs du Dernier Adieu; and was a member of the Hawaiian Lodge No. 21, F. & A. M. Soper married Mary Elizabeth Wundenberg at Vallejo, California, in 1871; they had five children.

Soper died July 26, 1944, in Honolulu.

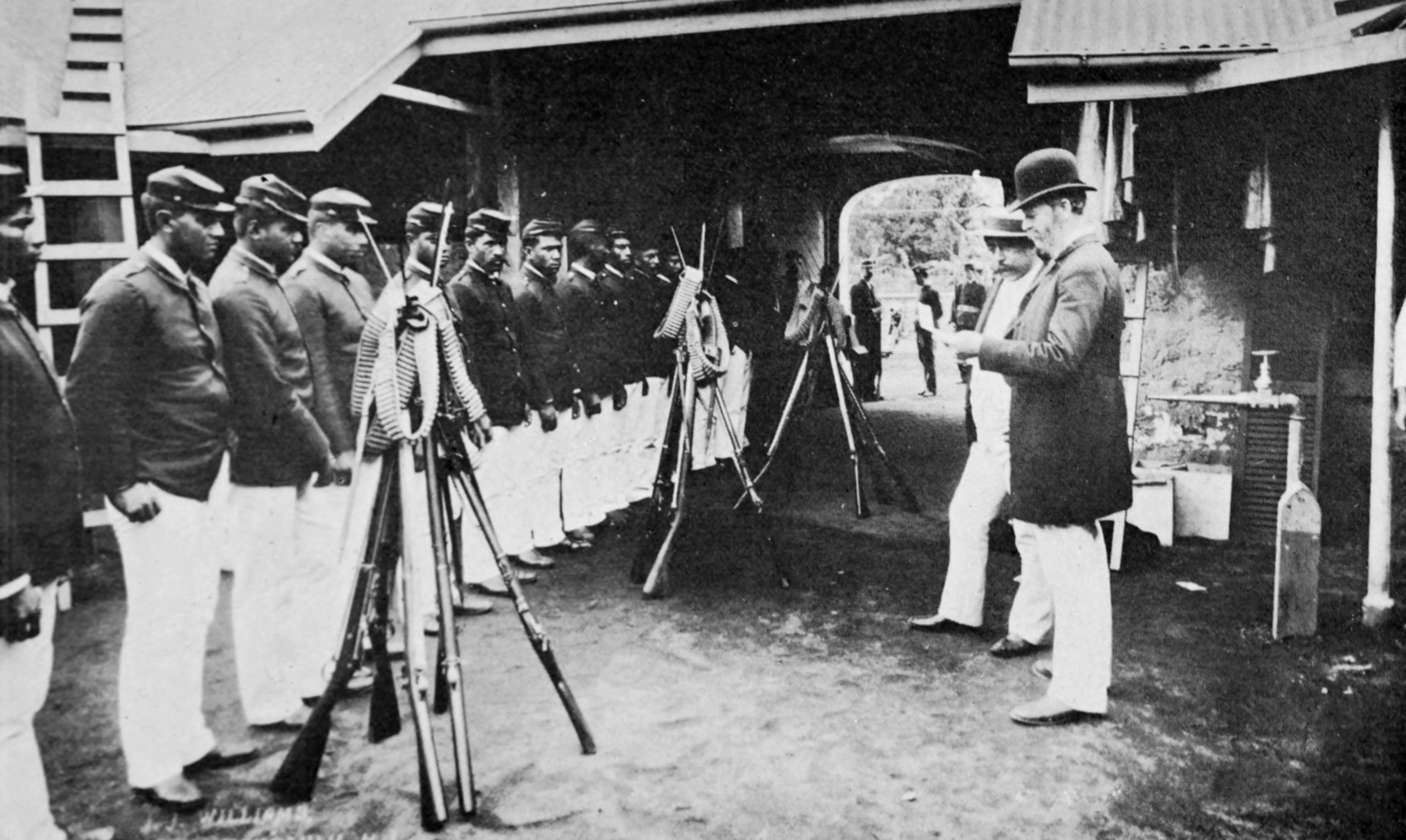
Queen Liliuokalani's Household Guard being disarmed by Col. Soper following the overthrow of the monarchy in January, 1893.

== Partial works ==
- 1906, Hawaiian phrase book: na huaolelo a me na olelo kikeke ma ka olelo Beritania a me ka olelo Hawaii
