= The Queen's Medical Center =

Hospital in Honolulu, Hawaiʻi

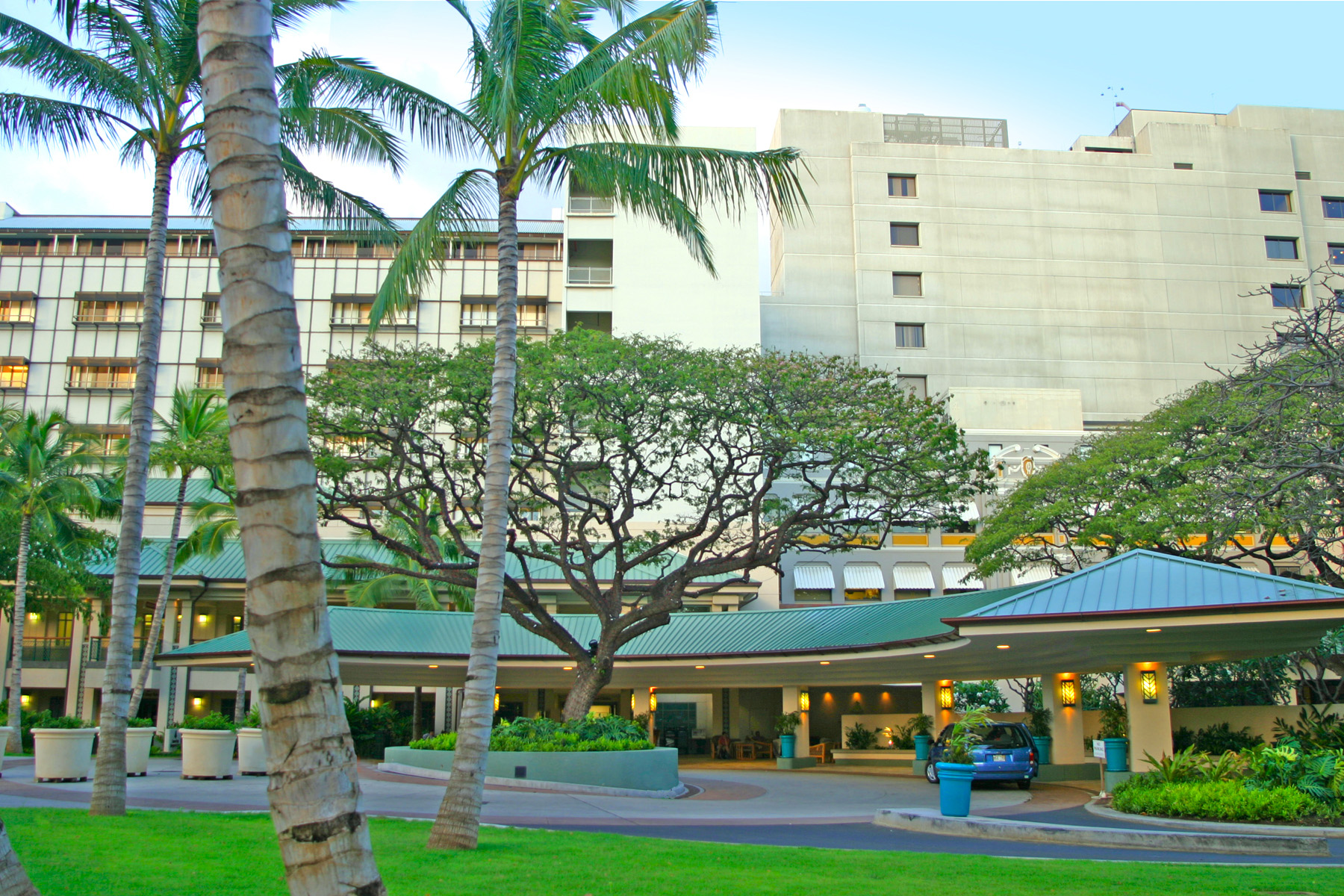
- Front view of The Queen's Medical Center

Geography
- Location: Honolulu, Hawaii, United States
- Coordinates: 21°18′26″N 157°51′15″W

Organization
- Care system: Private
- Type: Community
- Patron: Queen Emma and Kamehameha IV

Services
- Emergency department: Level I trauma center
- Beds: 575

History
- Founded: 1859

Links
- Website: http://www.queens.org
- Lists: Hospitals in Hawaii

The Queen's Medical Center, originally named and still commonly referred to as Queen's Hospital, is the largest private non-profit hospital in Honolulu, Hawaii. The institution was founded in 1859 by Queen Emma and King Kamehameha IV, and is located in Downtown Honolulu.

== Description ==
Queen's is the largest private hospital in Hawaiʻi, licensed to operate with 575 acute care beds. With 3,600 employees—including 1,160 nurses and over 1,100 physicians on staff—it is also one of the state of Hawaiʻi's largest employers. It is a Level I trauma center and the only designated Level I trauma center in the state of Hawaiʻi, and first Level I in the Pacific.

The Queen's Medical Center is also the first and only Comprehensive Stroke Center in Hawai'i. It is located in downtown Honolulu, southwest of Interstate H-1.

Queen's is accredited by the Joint Commission on Accreditation of Healthcare Organizations (JCAHO) and affiliated with the Voluntary Hospitals of America (VHA). The medical center is also approved to participate in residency training by the Accreditation Council for Graduate Medical Education.

In 2009, The Queen's Medical Center achieved Magnet status from the American Nurses Credentialing Center. Magnet recognition is held by six percent of hospitals in the United States. Queen's is the first hospital in Hawaiʻi to achieve Magnet status.

The Queen's Medical Center is a 501 (c) (3) non-profit corporation.

== Core operation ==
=== Patient care ===
As the leading medical referral center in the Pacific Basin, Queen's is widely known for its programs in cancer, cardiovascular disease, neuroscience, orthopedics, surgery, trauma, behavioral medicine and women's health. Queen's offers a comprehensive range of specialties, including gastroenterology, genetics, geriatrics, gynecology, neonatology, obstetrics, psychiatry, pulmonology, and radiology. It is one of the few hospitals in the state with both a 24-hour emergency psychiatry consultation service and a busy yet robust consultation-liaison service. Kekela is the 20-bed acute adult inpatient psychiatric unit, and the Family Treatment Center is Queen's child and adolescent psychiatry inpatient unit supporting acute and residential beds with up to 20 patients at any one time. Outpatient care at Queen's is available through outpatient clinics on Oahu, Big Island, and Molokai with more than 20 clinics, as well as Queen Emma Clinics, a primary care clinic with a focus on the uninsured and underinsured. Queen's is the only Level I trauma center in Hawaii verified by the American College of Surgeons.

=== Partnerships ===
Queen's Health Systems (QHS) has partnered with many organizations in order to improve patient care and the medical work environment. By partnering with the John A. Burns School of Medicine Department of Native Hawaiian Health, they have funded positions at Queen's hospital, such as adding a psychologist, that allow for a diverse interdisciplinary team in the surgery room. By doing so, this has provided improvements in team communication, interaction, and ultimately effectiveness.

In 2015, the Queen's Medical Center began a collaborative affiliation with the Johns Hopkins Armstrong Institute for Patient Safety and Quality in order to improve patient safety and quality healthcare improvement programs.

=== Philanthropy ===
Queen's Health Systems (QHS) has been a major pillar of financial support for many various organizations in the State of Hawaiʻi. Since 2002, QHS has donated approximately $10 million to the University of Hawaiʻi Native Hawaiian Health programs, as of 2016. The funds are aimed to address the disproportionately high occurrences of illness in the Native Hawaiian population.

The funds are distributed to many other programs that push to eliminate these disparities. Among these programs is the ʻImi Hoʻōla Post-Baccalaureate Program. QHS provides stipends to the current students for financial support throughout their tenure in the program. ʻImi Hoʻōla aims to recruit those who are interested in medicine and who may have come from disadvantaged backgrounds. These participants who complete the program are able to matriculate into the John A. Burns School of Medicine. Many of the ʻImi Hoʻōla graduates end up serving underserved communities all throughout the Pacific and beyond, making it one of the most successful programs in the country for recruiting future physicians in rural communities.

Not only do the funds go to programs, but also in efforts to help policy makers in Hawaiʻi to create important policies and documents that address the needs of those within the Native Hawaiian community among the islands. These policies pave the way into making administrative change that ultimately allow for improvements in the health of Native Hawaiians.

=== Education ===
The Queen's Medical Center serves as the primary teaching hospital for most of the residency programs sponsored by the University of Hawaiʻi at Manoa John A. Burns School of Medicine. It also serves as one of the clinical training sites for medical students completing their third-year clinical clerkship, electives and sub-internships.

Queen Emma Clinics is also partnered with the University of Hawaiʻi at Manoa John A. Burns School of Medicine (JABSOM) to provide medical students and resident physicians clinical training and education.

In 1999, Queen Emma Clinics and JABSOM successfully piloted the joint JABSOM School Health Education Program (SHEP) as part of first year medical students' community medicine and service-learning curriculum. This program is facilitated by first year medical students and aims to educate local public high school students about relevant health care topics, such as drug use, sexual health, alcohol, diet, and exercise. The program also seeks to promote medical student involvement in community service, academics, and health promotion.

In 2019, Queen's Health Systems announced a partnership with Kapiʻolani Community College (KCC) to offer a joint 12-month medical assisting program. The program offers free tuition for 26 Hawaiʻi residents and the students will gain hands-on experience at The Queen's Medical Center while they attend classes at KCC. The program was created in response to the shortage of medical professionals in Hawaiʻi.

=== Scholarships ===
Along with their financial philanthropy for programs and policies, another notable donation is towards scholarships. Many of the scholars are in efforts to support the Native Hawaiian Health Initiative that involves supporting healthcare training via scholarships and training assistance.

The four goals of the Native Hawaiian Health Program are:

1. Improving clinical outcomes for Native Hawaiians
2. Increasing access to Queen's services and improving outreach to the Native Hawaiian community
3. Providing health care training opportunities for Native Hawaiians
4. Conducting and participating in research that will help improve Native Hawaiian health

In 2007, QHS donated $25,000 towards scholarships for a variety of health programs at the Kapiʻolani Community College. In efforts to support beyond physicians, pharmacists, and nurses, these funds go toward health programs such as the radiologic technology program.

== History ==
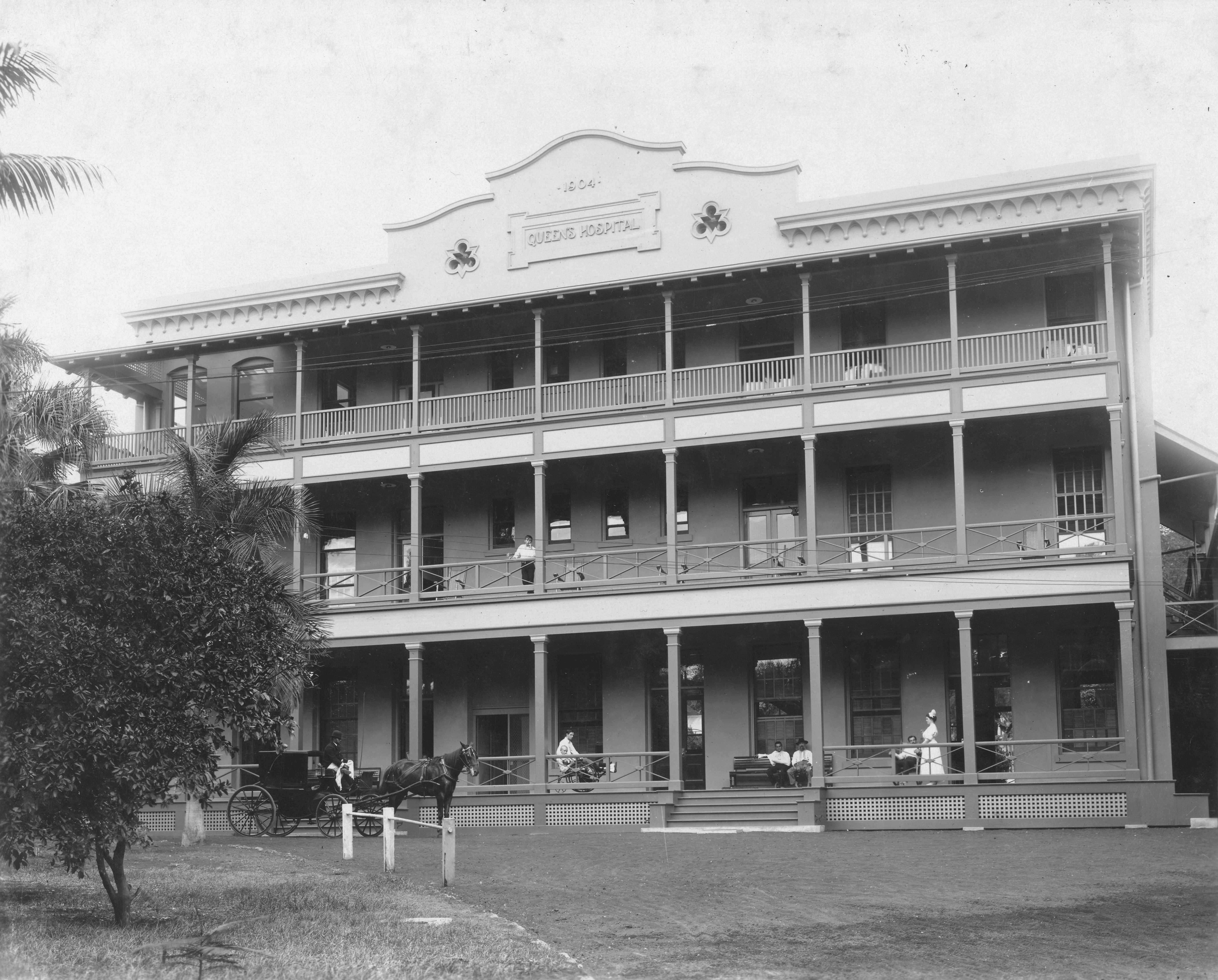
The Queen's Hospital in 1905

In King Kamehameha IV's initial speech to the legislature in January 1855, the King proposed creating a hospital for the people of Hawaii. At that time, the continued existence of the Hawaiian race was seriously threatened by the influx of disease brought to the islands by foreign visitors. A smallpox epidemic in 1853 had killed thousands of the dwindling population. French-American physician Charles Guillou proposed building a public hospital in April 1858. When Emma's adoptive father Dr. Thomas Rooke died in 1858, all his instruments were donated to the hospital effort. In January 1859 a committee of Robert Crichton Wyllie (a former physician) and David L. Gregg was formed to plan the hospital investigate funding. Queen Emma enthusiastically supported the dream of a hospital, and the two campaigned to make it a reality. They personally went door-to-door soliciting the necessary funding. The royal couple exceeded their goal in just over a month, raising $13,530. In turn, the Legislature appropriated $6,000. The first hospital physician was William Hillebrand, who served until 1871.

The site picked in 1860 was an area called Manamana owned by Caesar Kapaʻakea, patriarch of the House of Kalākaua. The architect Theodore Heuck was selected for the first building. The name was changed to The Queen's Medical Center in 1967.

The hospital was featured in two episodes of the television series Trauma: Life in the ER.

== Awards and recognition ==
In 2009, the Queen's Medical Center became the first and only healthcare facility in Hawaiʻi to become designated as a Magnet Recognized hospital by the American Nurses Credentialing Center (ANCC). They were redesignated in 2014. They were also awarded the Harold P. Freeman Service Award. Which was created originally in 1990 to recognize Mr. Freeman's advocacy in connecting relationships between cancer, race, and poverty.

Queen's is recognized by the American College of Surgeons as a verified Level I Trauma Center.

The Queen's Medical Center is also recognized as the first and only hospital in Hawaiʻi to be affiliated with the MD Anderson Cancer Network to bring cancer patients in Hawaiʻi access to advanced practices and treatment plans.

The National Association of Epilepsy Centers (NAEC) has accredited the Queen's Comprehensive Epilepsy Center as a Level 4 Center.

On January 9, 2017, the Queen's Medical Center has received The Joint Commission's Gold Seal of Approval for Advanced Certification for Comprehensive Stroke Centers by The Joint Commission, American Heart Association, and American Stroke Association.

Additional recognitions awarded to Queens Medical Center include:

- American College of Surgeons'
  - Commission on Cancer
  - Accreditation by the National Accreditation Program for Breast Centers
- Queen's Transplant Center
- The Joint Commission's Advanced Certification in Total Hip and Total Knee Replacement
- The Joint Commission's Advanced Certification in Palliative Care
- American College of Radiology's Breast Imaging Center of Excellence
- American Stroke Association's Get With The Guidelines Stroke Gold Performance Achievement Award
- American Heart Association's Get With The Guidelines Coronary Artery Disease Gold Performance Achievement Award
