= National Guard of Hawaii =

- Active: January 27, 1893-August 12, 1898
- Disbanded: August 12, 1898
- Country: Hawaii
- Allegiance: Provisional Government of Hawaii; Republic of Hawaii
- Branch: Home Guard
- Type: Militia
- Role: Internal conflict
- Engagements: Leper War; Uprising of 1895

Commanders
- Marshal: John Harris Soper
- Marshal: Edward G. Hitchcock

The National Guard of Hawaii was established by Provisional Government of Hawaii. It was a military branch intended to deal with internal conflict in Hawaii.

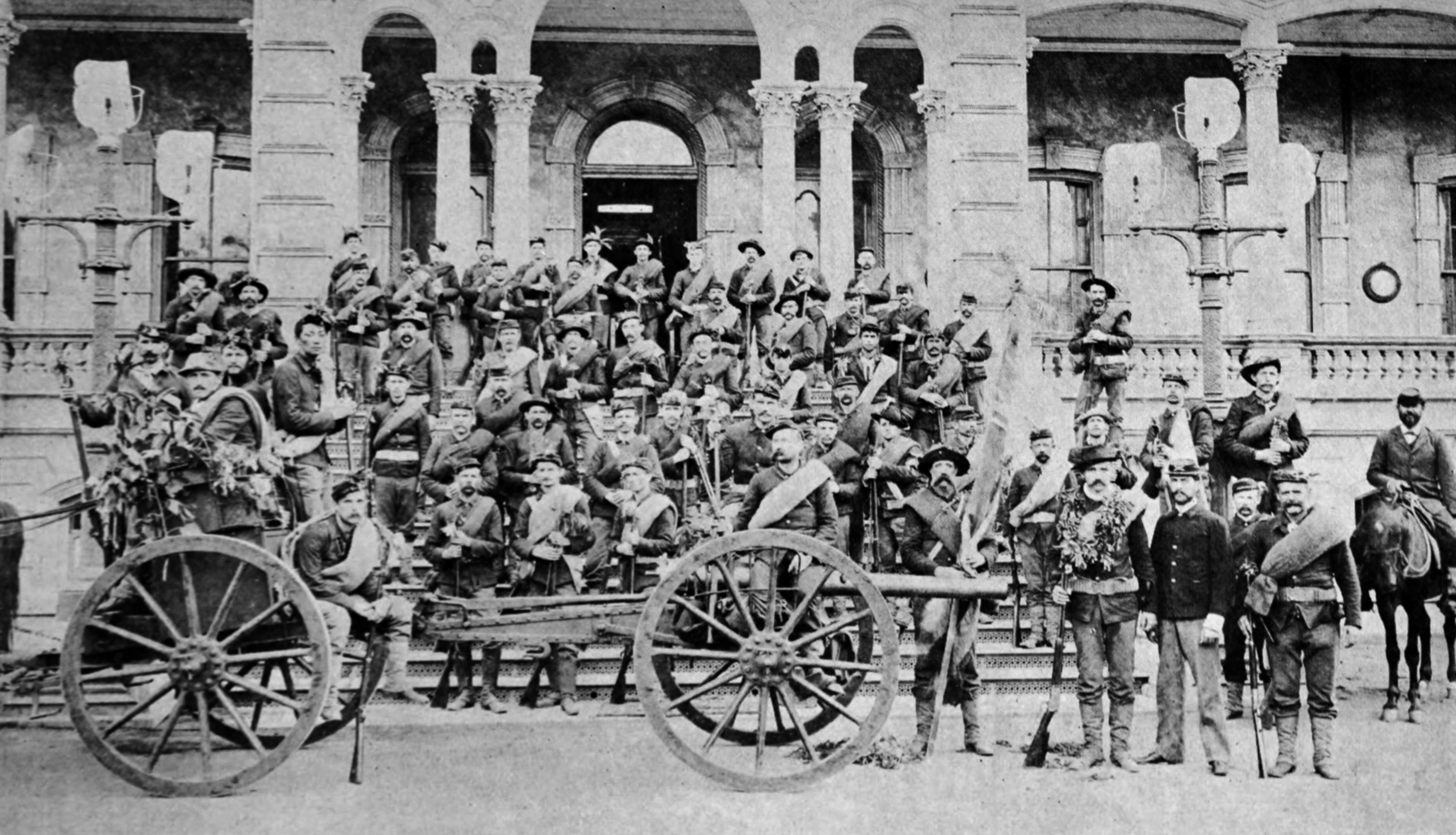
National Guard Company F, 1895

After the overthrow of the Hawaiian Monarchy the Provisional Government of Hawaii was established on January 17, 1893. On January 27, 1893, a military was formed and put under the command of Colonel John Soper. This military consisted of four companies: three National Guard companies and one regular army company. The national guard companies were: the A Company made up of ethnic German volunteers, commanded by Charles W. Zeigler; B Company made up of members of the Honolulu Rifles, commanded by Hugh Gunn; and C Company made up of ethnic Portuguese volunteers, commanded by Joseph M. Camara. The regulars were D Company made up, like B Company, from the Honolulu Rifles, commanded by John Good.

The military was active under the Provisional Government of Hawaii where they were activated in the Leprosy War in 1893 and the Republic of Hawaii and were again activated during the 1895 Counter-Revolution in Hawaii in 1895. After Hawaii was annexed and transformed into the Territory of Hawaii in 1898, the companies entered the Army National Guard system and became part of the Hawaii Army National Guard.
