= Theodore Heuck =

American architect (1830–1877)

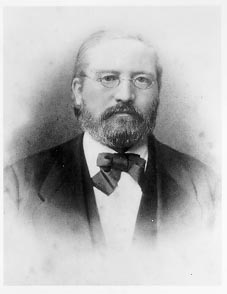
Theodore C. Heuck

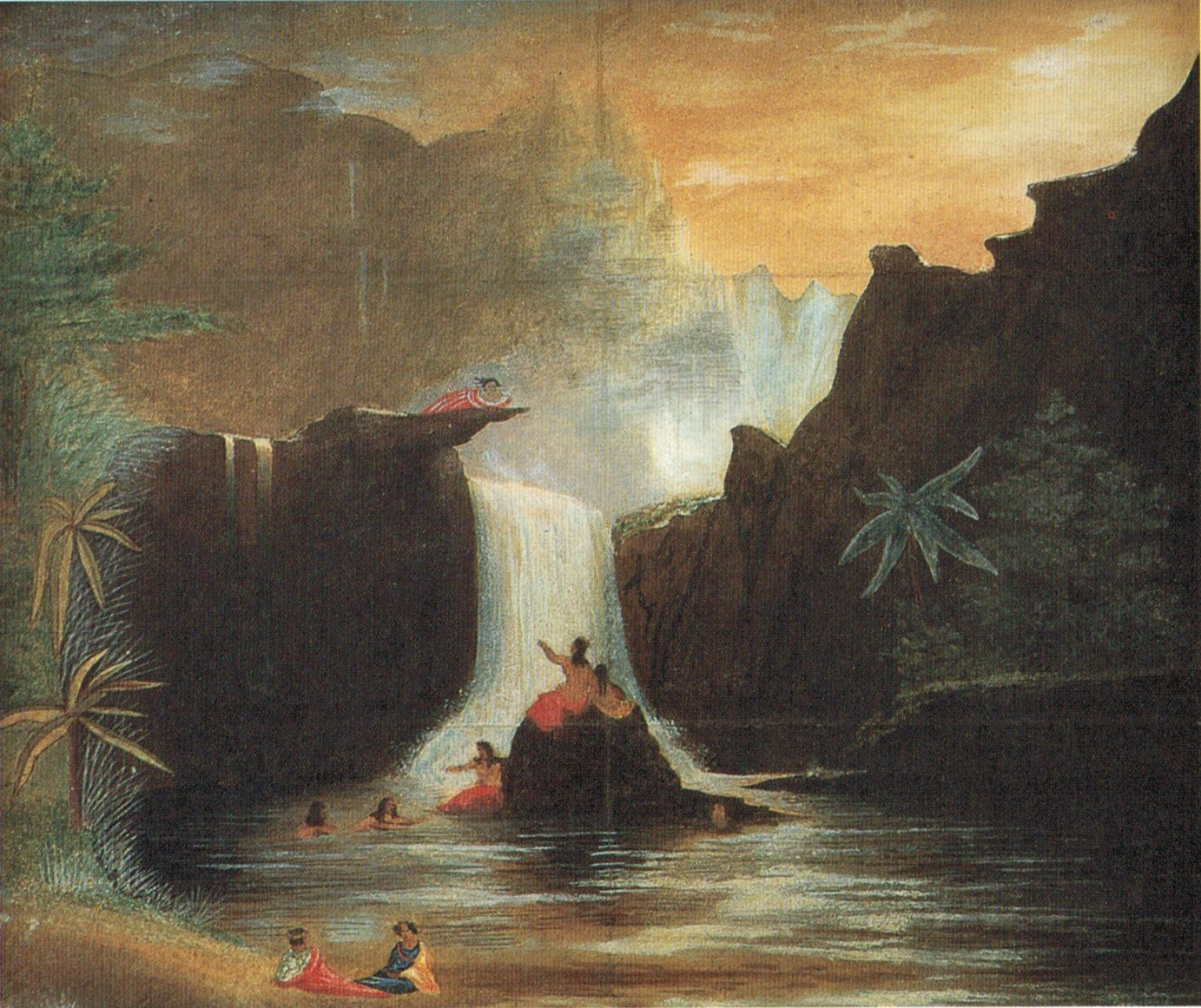
Nuuanu Falls, Honolulu, oil paint on paper by Theodore Heuck, c. 1855

Theodore C. Heuck (1830–1877) was an architect, a merchant, and a painter. He designed The Queen's Medical Center (dedicated to Queen Emma), the Royal Mausoleum of Hawaii in 1865, and ʻIolani Barracks in 1871.

== Early life ==
He was born in Hamburg, Germany and grew up as an only child. Traveling from Australia, Heuck arrived in Hawaii January 20, 1850 and advertised as the first professional architect. Finding no business, he became a partner with Herman Von Halt in a retail store, "General Commission Merchants". He became a citizen of the Kingdom of Hawaii and married Mahiki on March 22, 1852.

== Starting out ==
Trained as an architect, carpenter, and engineer Theodore C. Heuck was first noticed by King Kamehameha IV while walking around Heuck's retail store. The king saw Heuck's work and immediately wanted him to start building architecture in Honolulu. Heuck agreed and decided that he and his partner Herman Von Halt should split up. Their retail store was shut down and Von Halt went on to being a merchant while Heuck started building for the king.

== The contract ==
Theodore C. Heuck signed a contract stating that any building he constructed would be free of flaws. Failure to meet the terms of this contract would be death. Instead, the other men had received their pay when all they did was check to see if Theodore was doing his job. Of course, Theodore was furious with this but did not stress the matter, for fear that he would be killed for not being appreciative of the gift he already had. Before starting, Heuck was given a contract on May 26 which stated that he would be responsible for any flaws that may occur when finished with any piece of architecture.

== The Queen's Hospital ==
By order of King Kamehameha IV, the Queens Hospital, now known as The Queen's Medical Center, was created in 1860 and was dedicated to Queen Emma and the people of Hawaii. This building was Heuck's first major project. In order to start building this creation, King Kamehameha IV had to first get approval from the legislature. So in 1854 he announced to the legislature the objective to create a hospital for the people of Hawaii. At that time, the Hawaiian race was seriously threatened by different types of disease brought to the islands by foreign visitors. Queen Emma supported the dream of a hospital, and the two campaigned tirelessly to make it a reality. They personally went door-to-door making the necessary funding. The royal couple exceeded their goal in just over a month, raising $13,530. In turn, the Legislature provided $6,000. On November 1, 1860, Heuck's contract ended. The trustees thanked Heuck for his hard work and promised that his name would be placed on the building, but he did not receive any money.

Heuck was appointed to the Privy Council from 1863 ro 1864, and then elected a representative to the legislature of the Hawaiian Kingdom from 1864 to 1867, and served as the secretary of the Board of Health. He was also made a Knight of the order of Kamehameha I and a trustee of Queens Hospital. The Queen's Medical Center has become a major provider of health care to the people of Hawaii and stands near downtown Honolulu on Punchbowl Street.

== The Royal Mausoleum ==
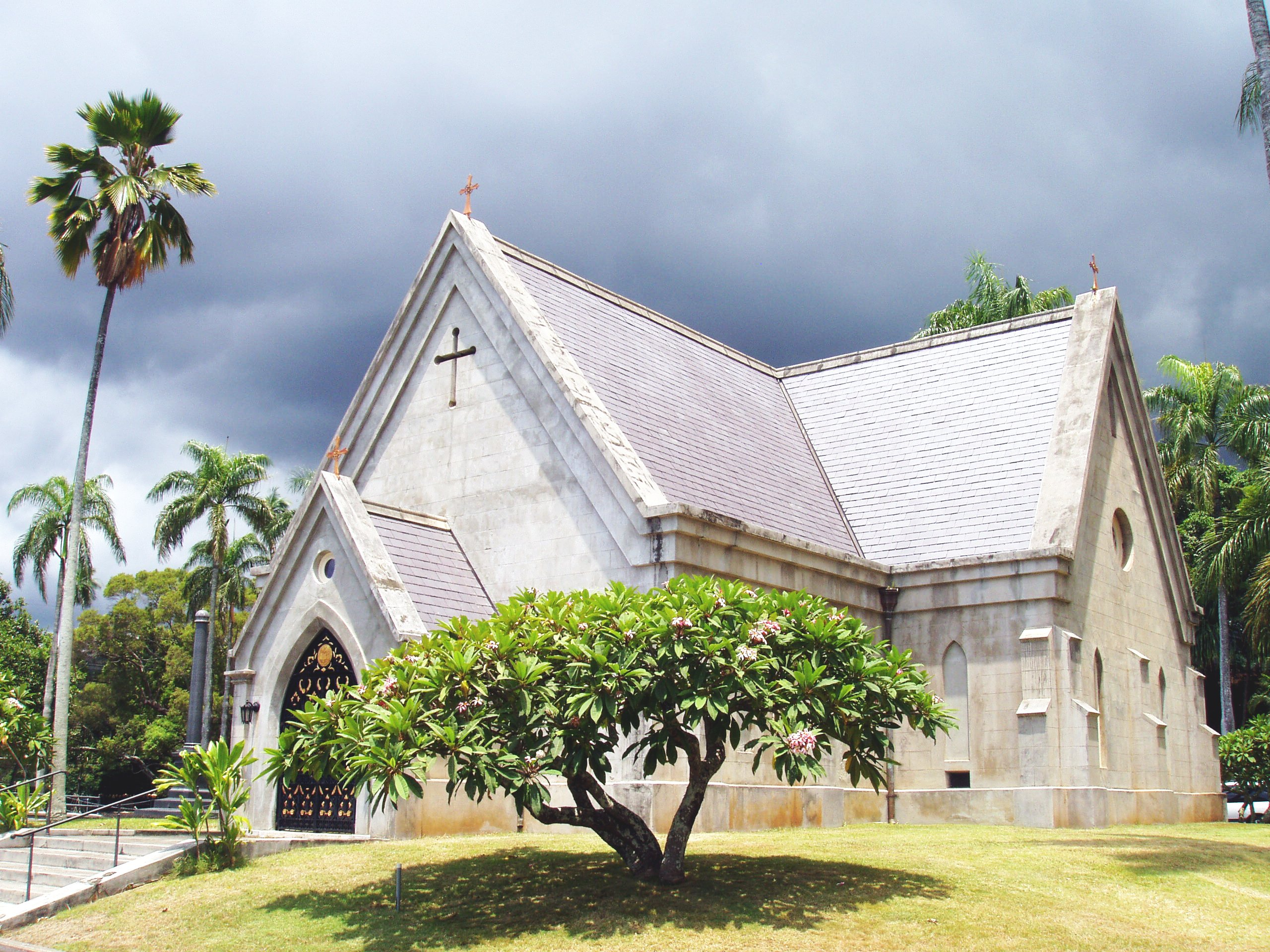
Royal Mausoleum of Hawaii

King Kamehameha IV died November 30, 1863, 15 months after his son. His brother Lot Kamehameha came to the throne of Hawaii as King Kamehameha V. Immediately Heuck was hired to start the construction of a building for the king and the son known as The Royal Mausoleum.

Built by Heuck in Nuʻuanu, Oahu at Mauna ʻala, the Royal Mausoleum was surrounded by a black fence, bearing the royal seal at the gate and built a small chapel which is located near the center. This was Heuck's second project. After finishing this structure on February 3, 1864, there was a large national funeral for the king.

== ʻIolani Barracks ==
Built partially from coral blocks and blocks cut with prison labour, ʻIolani Barracks, also known as Halekoa, (House of warriors) was designed by Heuck in 1871 under the direction of King Lot Kapuaiwa (King Kamehameha V). The barracks was used by the kingdom's army, formerly called the "Household Troops" and housed about 60 soldiers. Heuck constructed the barracks to have a medieval castle look from Europe. It had coral block walls and a slate roof. It was surrounded by rooms once used by the guards as a mess hall, kitchen, dispensary, and lock up. This building was originally constructed in the site where the Hawai State Capital now stands. Every stone of Iolani Barracks was moved in 1965 to its present location at 364 South King Street on the Iolani Palace grounds. This was Heuck's third project completed and he spent an overbudgeted amount of $25,103.78. After the completion of this architecture Heuck's name was placed in the back of the barracks. The structure was placed on the National Register of Historic Places in 1978. After the overthrow of the Kingdom of Hawaii in 1893 the barracks was used on several occasions as headquarters for the National Guard of Hawaii. Now it has a palace shop, ticket office, video theater, and membership office.

== Controversy ==
Theodore C. Heuck was awarded many times for his architectural work and has been recognized for his altruism. Controversy still was part of his life. In 1870 Attorney General Stephen Henry Phillips claimed that Heuck was buying stolen whalebone to construct a building. This case continued until 1873 when both men went to court. During the trial, the jury decided Heuck was innocent. Meanwhile, Phillips was found guilty of presenting false evidence. Heuck was later attacked for getting "no bid" contracts on government projects while effectively serving as Director of Public Works.

== The end of a legacy ==
Throughout his years in the islands, Heuck had an enthusiasm for his work and was gratified by people's reactions to what he had built. On September 28, 1874, Heuck left Honolulu and returned to his home in Hamburg, Germany. In 1877 he died in Germany.
