= 7 cm Gebirgsgeschütz M 75 =

World War I Austro-Hungarian mountain gun

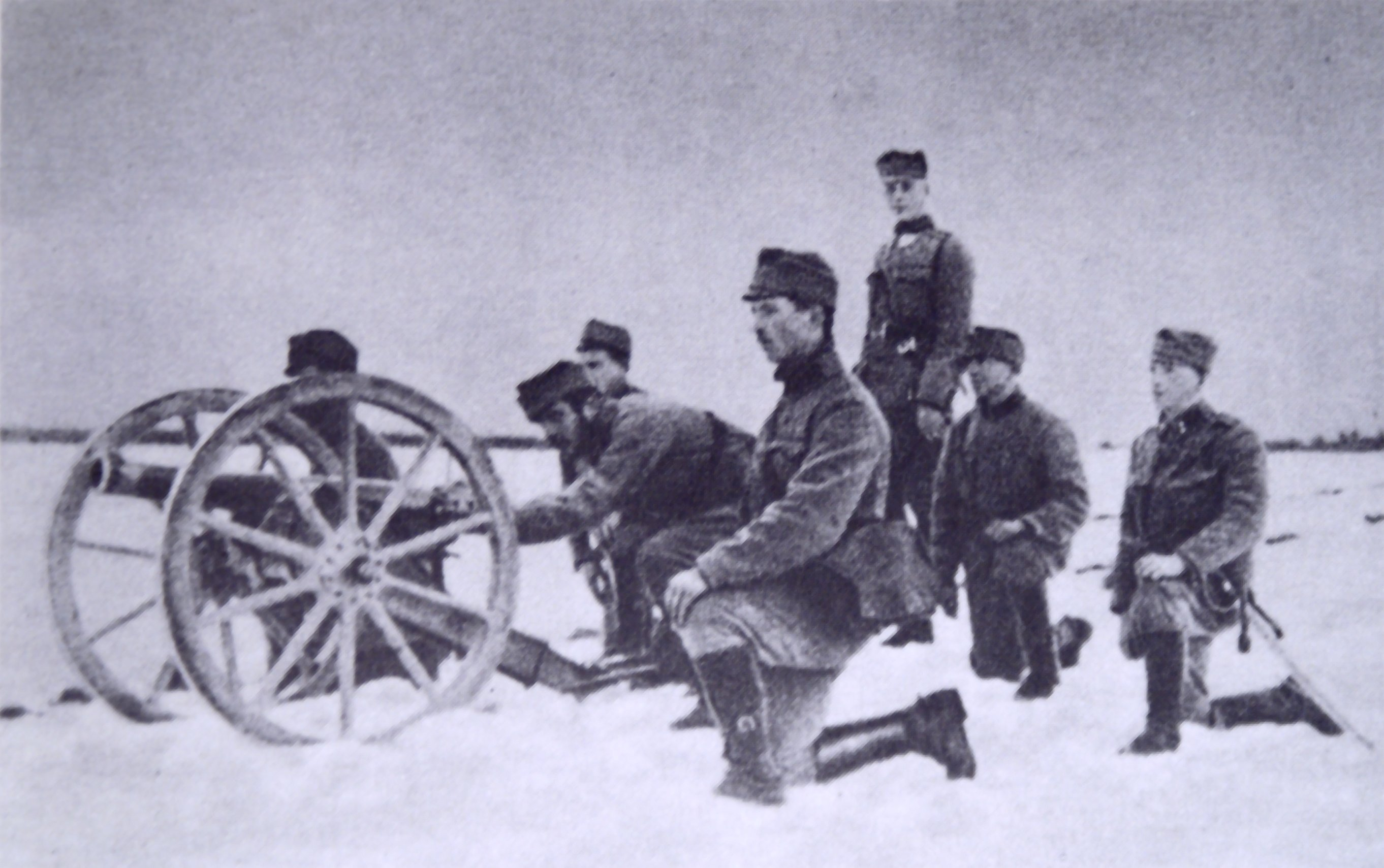
- A Gebirgsgeschütz M 75 in action with the Polish Legions.
- Type: Mountain gun
- Place of origin: Austria-Hungary

Service history
- In service: 1875–1918
- Used by: Austria-Hungary; Hawaiian Kingdom; United States
- Wars: Hawaiian rebellions (1887–1895); World War I

Production history
- Designer: Škoda
- Designed: 1875
- Manufacturer: Škoda
- Produced: 1875

Specifications
- Mass: 199 kg (439 lb)
- length: 990 mm (3 ft 3 in) L/15
- Width: 737 mm (2 ft 5 in)
- Height: 644 mm (2 ft 1 in)
- Crew: 4

The 7 cm Gebirgsgeschütz M 75 was a bronze-steel mountain gun used by Austria-Hungary during World War I. Despite its 7 cm designation, it actually fired a 66 mm (2.6 in) projectile. The Austro-Hungarian Army used rounded centimeter designations for its artillery pieces.

The gun was equipped with an early form of the Krupp horizontal sliding-block breech and used separate-loading, bagged charges and projectiles. Its low-profile design allowed the breech to recoil into the ground, restricting its elevation and limiting its effectiveness as a mountain gun, where high angles of elevation were particularly important. For transport, the Gebirgsgeschütz M 75 could be broken down into two loads.

== Photo Gallery ==
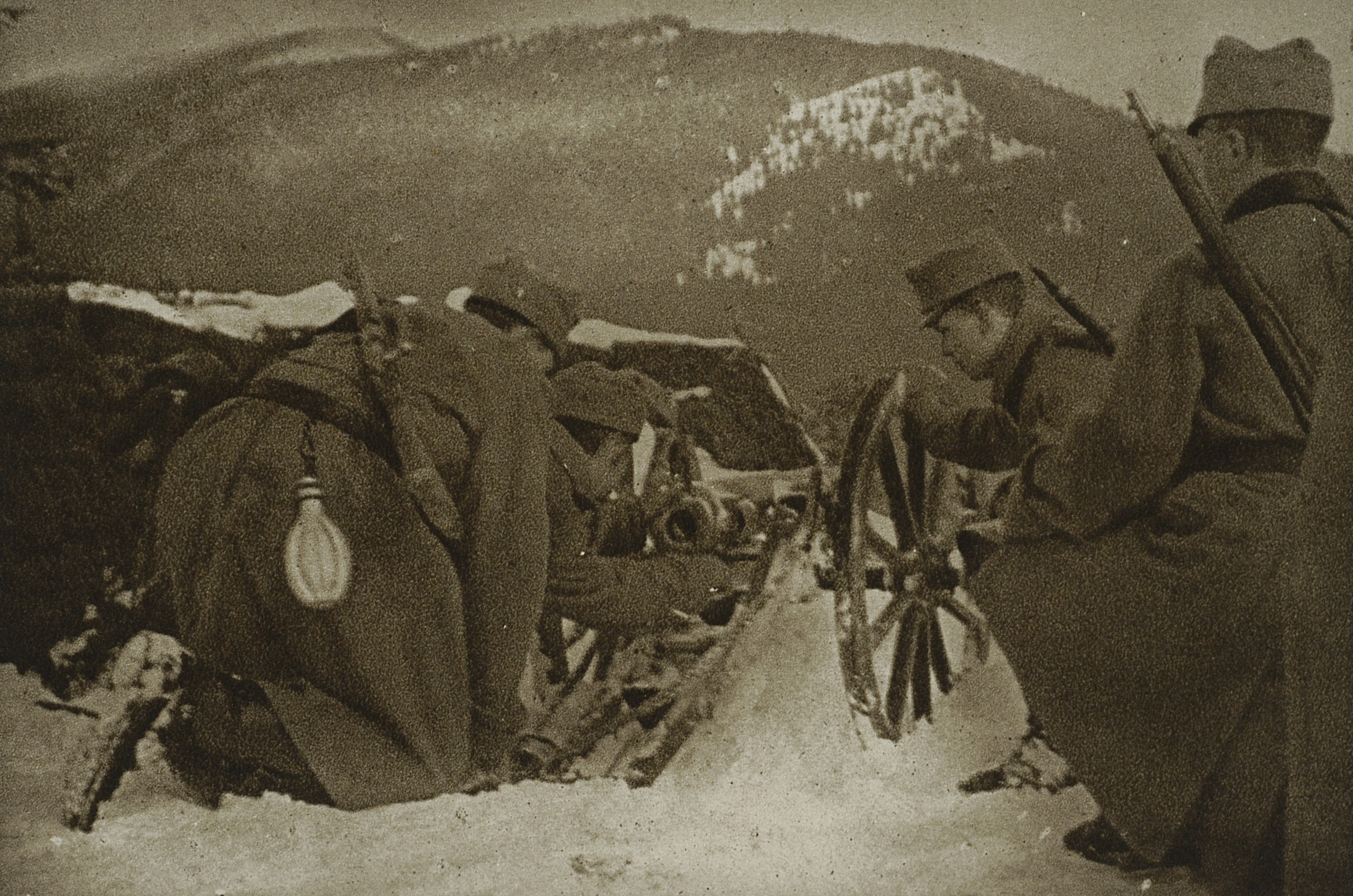

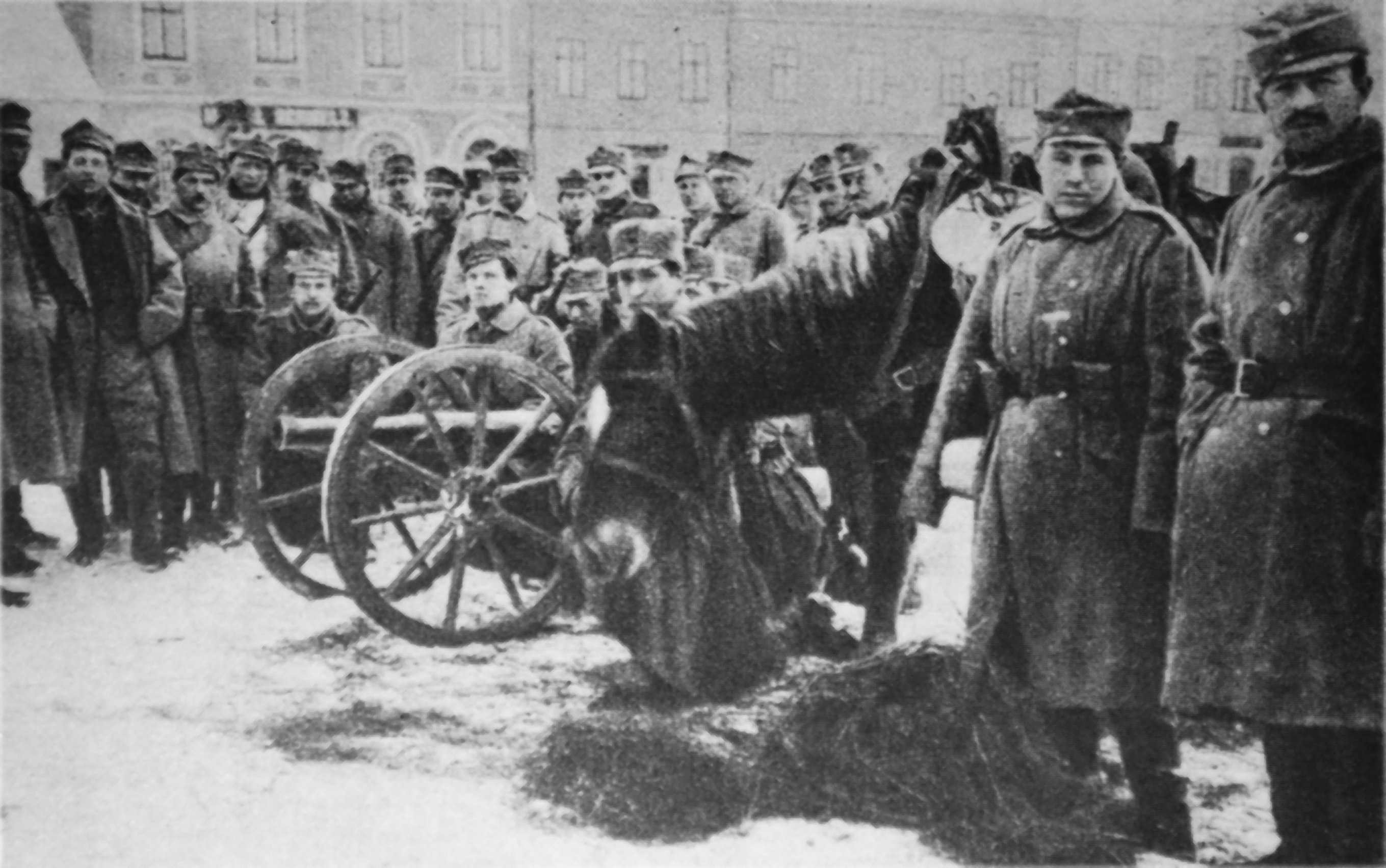

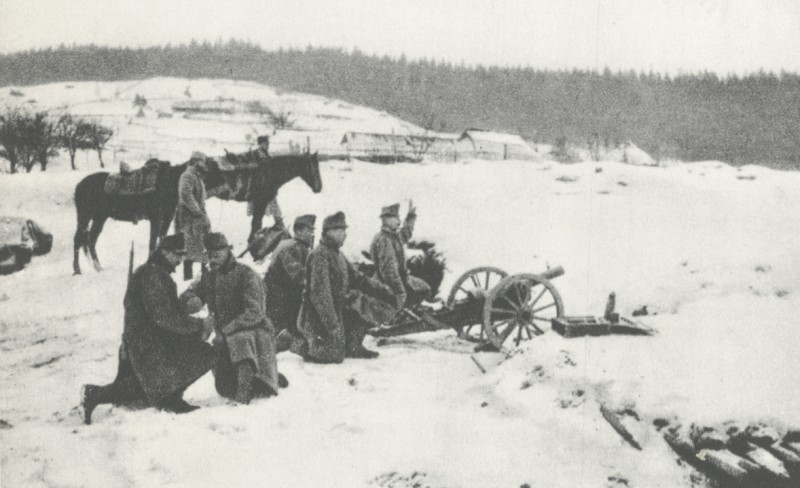

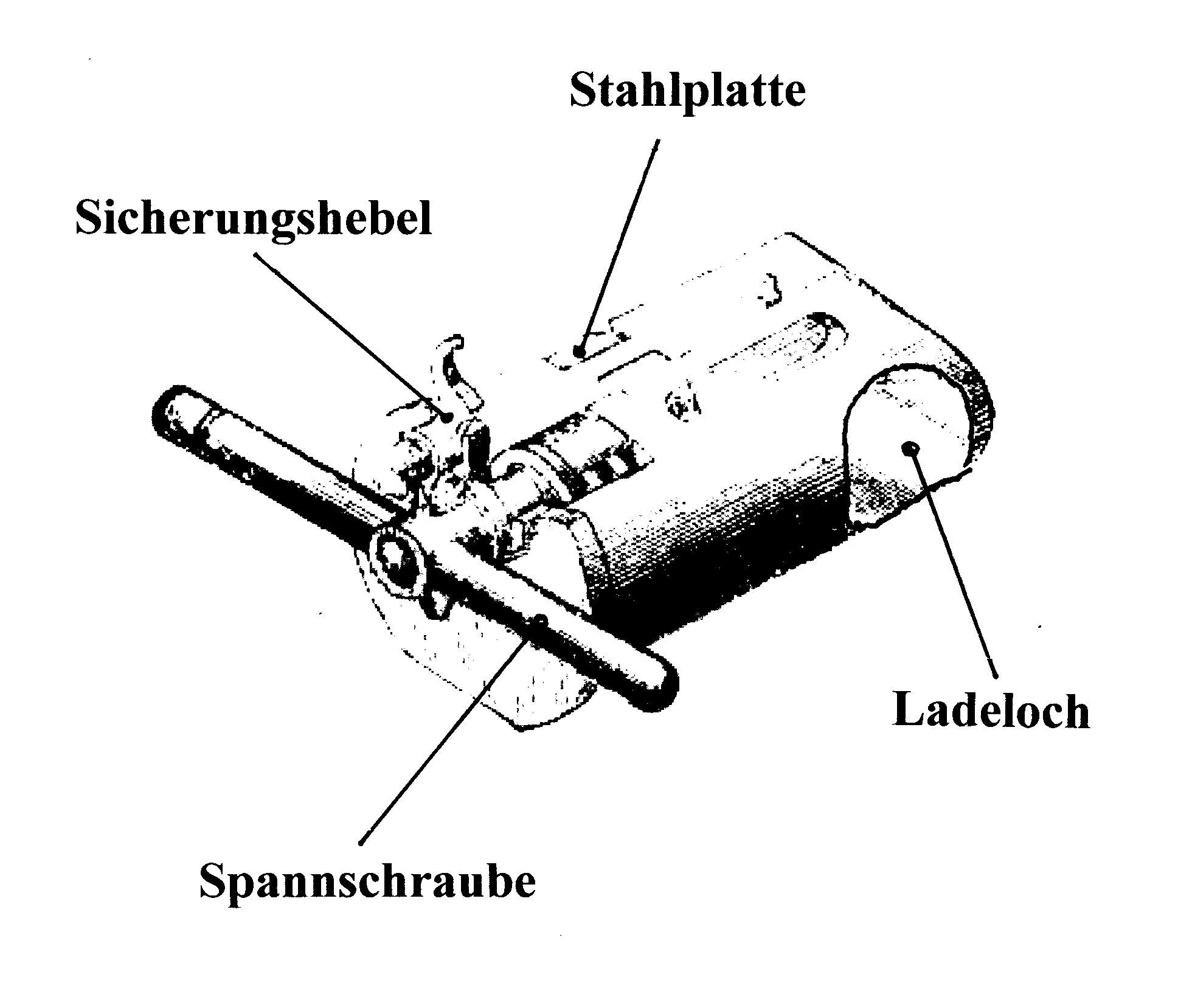
The M 75's breech block.

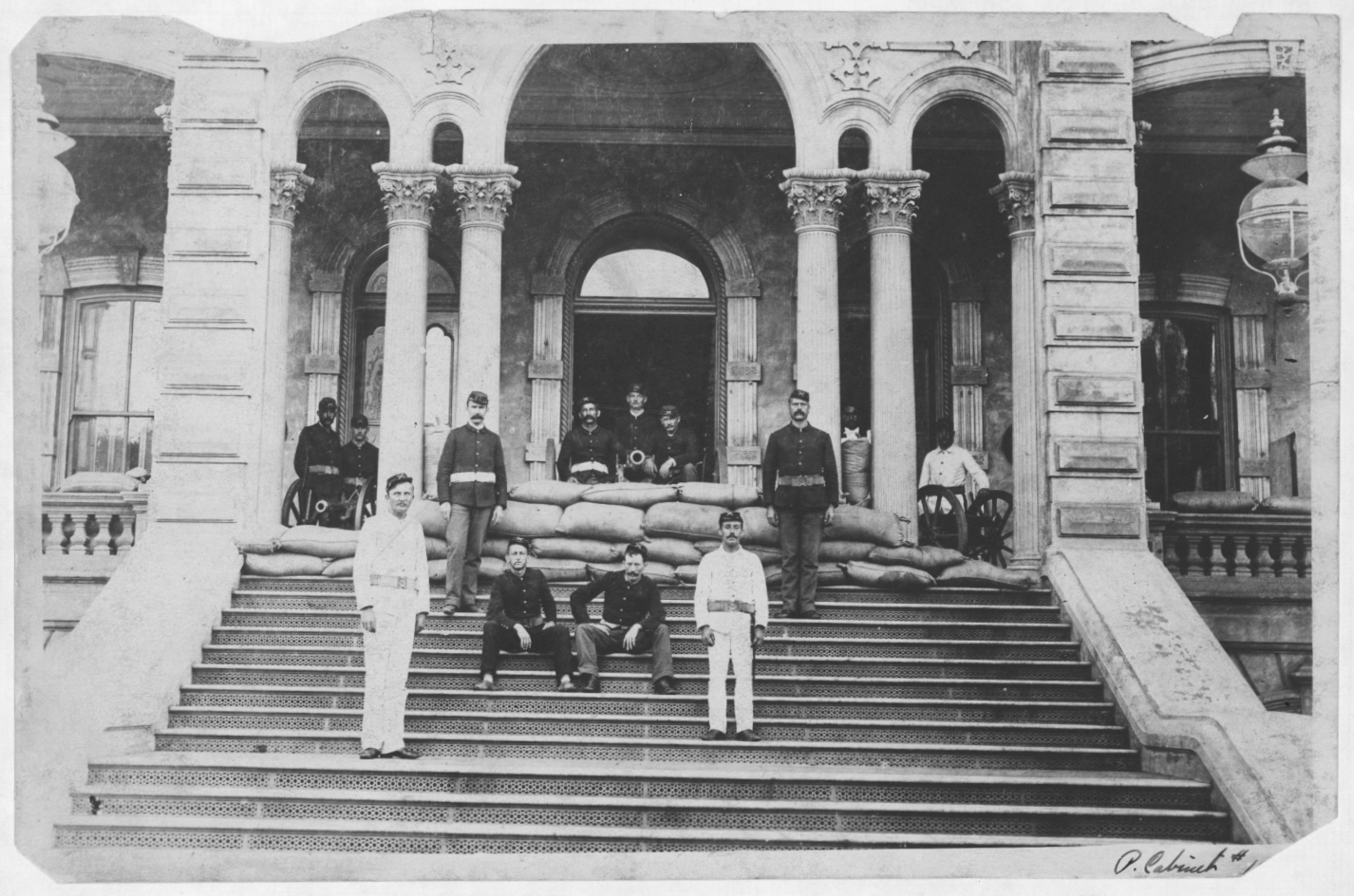
