= Kapahei Kauai =

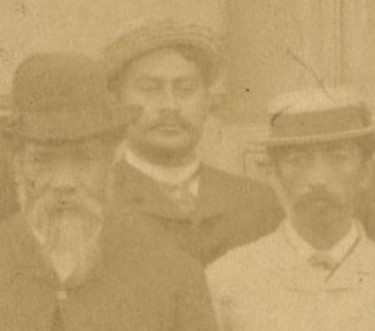
- Kapahei Kauai (center) in 1886

Member of the Kingdom of Hawaii House of Representatives for the district of Waimea, Kauai
- In office 1874–1882

Personal details
- Born: c. 1825
- Died: 1893 Kalihi Hospital, Honolulu
- Party: Emmaite
- Occupation: Tax assessor, judge
- Profession: Civil servant

Kapahei "Judge" Kauai (c. 1825 – August 1, 1893), also known as the "Arch-Leper" (a play on "Archbishop") was a judge and leper organizer.

== Biography ==
In the late 1880s, he found he had contracted leprosy and fled to Kalalau Valley leading a number of other lepers. Following the overthrow of the Hawaiian Kingdom, the Provisional Government forcibly relocated many lepers. In 1893, deputy sheriff Louis H. Stolz attempted to capture the lepers but was shot and killed by Kaluai Koʻolau. Kauai organized the colony members for the repercussions. On July 1, the Waialeale landed troops. At the age of 68 and crippled by the disease, Kauai attempted to hide from the soldiers by crawling under his bed. He was the first one found and pulled out by his feet and deported to Kalaupapa.

== Bibliography ==
- Joesting, Edward (1984). Kauai: The Separate Kingdom. Honolulu: University of Hawaii Press. ISBN 978-0-8248-0943-0. OCLC 10998717.
- Kaeo, Peter; Queen Emma (1976). Korn, Alfons L. (ed.). News from Molokai, Letters Between Peter Kaeo & Queen Emma, 1873–1876. Honolulu: The University Press of Hawaii. pp. 202, 203, 209, 210, 227, 251, 296, 299, 300. hdl:10125/39980. ISBN 978-0-8248-0399-5. OCLC 2225064.
- Law, Anwei Skinsnes (2012). Kalaupapa: A Collective Memory (Ka Hokuwelowelo). Honolulu: University of Hawaii Press. pp. 229, 232, 233, 244. ISBN 978-0-8248-6580-1. OCLC 830023588 – via Project MUSE.
- London, Jack (1912). "Koolau the Leper". The House of Pride: And Other Tales of Hawaii. New York: The Macmillan Company. pp. 45–92. OCLC 13369633.
- Sheldon, John (1987). "True Story of Kaluaikoʻolau, or Koʻolau the Leper". The Hawaiian Journal of History. 21. Translated by Frances N. Frazier. Honolulu: Hawaiian Historical Society: 1–41. hdl:10524/563. OCLC 60626541.
- Tayman, John (2010). The Colony: The Harrowing True Story of the Exiles of Molokai. New York: Simon and Schuster. pp. 10, 11, 14, 107–108, 324. ISBN 978-1-4165-5192-8. OCLC 865230373.
