= Prince of Wales Rangers (Peterborough Regiment) =

The Prince of Wales Rangers (Peterborough Regiment)
- Active: 1867-1946
- Country: Canada
- Branch: Canadian Militia (1867-1940); Canadian Army (1940-1946)
- Type: Rangers
- Role: Infantry
- Size: One regiment
- Part of: Non-Permanent Active Militia (1867-1940); Royal Canadian Infantry Corps (1942-1946)
- Garrison/HQ: Peterborough, Ontario
- Engagements: First World War; Second World War
- Battle honours: See #Battle honours

The Prince of Wales Rangers (Peterborough Regiment) was an infantry regiment of the Non-Permanent Active Militia of the Canadian Militia (now the Canadian Army). It was formed in 1936 by the amalgamation of The Peterborough Rangers and the 3rd Prince of Wales' Canadian Dragoons. In 1946, the regiment was converted from infantry to artillery and was later redesignated as the 50th Field Artillery Regiment (The Prince of Wales Rangers), RCA (transferred to the Supplementary Order of Battle in 1970).

== Lineage ==
=== The Prince of Wales Rangers (Peterborough Regiment) ===
- Originated on 3 May 1867, in Peterborough, Ontario, as the 57th Peterborough Battalion of Infantry.
- Redesignated on 16 January 1880, as the 57th Battalion of Infantry Peterborough Rangers.
- Redesignated on 8 May 1900, as the 57th Regiment Peterborough Rangers.
- Redesignated on 12 March 1920, as The Peterborough Rangers.
- Amalgamated on 15 December 1936, with the 3rd The Prince of Wales' Canadian Dragoons and the Headquarters and C Company of the 4th Machine Gun Battalion, CMGC, and redesignated as The Prince of Wales Rangers (Peterborough Regiment) (MG).
- Redesignated on 5 March 1942, as the 2nd (Reserve) Battalion, The Prince of Wales Rangers (Peterborough Regiment).
- Redesignated on 1 June 1945, as The Prince of Wales Rangers (Peterborough Regiment).
- Converted on 1 April 1946, from infantry to artillery, and redesignated as the 50th Heavy Anti-Aircraft Regiment (The Prince of Wales Rangers), RCA.

=== 3rd Prince of Wales' Canadian Dragoons ===
- Originated on 30 April 1875, in Cobourg, Ontario, as the 3rd Provisional Regiment of Cavalry.
- Redesignated on 14 October 1881, as the 3rd Provisional Regiment of Cavalry, The Prince of Wales' Canadian Dragoons.
- Redesignated on 25 November 1892, as the 3rd Regiment of Cavalry, The Prince of Wales' Canadian Dragoons.
- Redesignated on 1 January 1893, as the 3rd The Prince of Wales' Canadian Dragoons.
- Amalgamated on 15 December 1936, with The Peterborough Rangers and the Headquarters and C Company of the 4th Machine Gun Battalion, CMGC, and redesignated as The Prince of Wales Rangers (Peterborough Regiment) (MG).

=== 4th Machine Gun Battalion, CMGC ===
- Originated on 1 June 1919, in Kingston, Ontario, as the 4th Machine Gun Brigade, CMGC.
- Redesignated on 15 September 1924, as the 4th Machine Gun Battalion, CMGC.
- Amalgamated on 15 December 1936, with The Peterborough Rangers and the 3rd The Prince of Wales' Canadian Dragoons, and redesignated as The Prince of Wales Rangers (Peterborough Regiment) (MG).

== Perpetuations ==
- 2nd Battalion (Eastern Ontario Regiment), CEF
- 93rd Battalion (Peterborough), CEF
- 247th Battalion (Victoria & Haliburton), CEF

== History ==
=== Second World War ===
On 5 March 1942, The Prince of Wales Rangers (Peterborough Regiment) mobilized an active service unit designated as the 1st Battalion, The Prince of Wales Rangers (Peterborough Regiment), CASF. The battalion served in Canada in a home defence role as part of the 16th Canadian Infantry Brigade, 8th Canadian Infantry Division on the Pacific Coast. On 10 January 1945, the battalion was disbanded.

== Organization ==
=== The Prince of Wales Rangers (Peterborough Regiment) (M.G.) (15 December 1936) ===
- Regimental Headquarters (Peterborough, Ontario)
- A Company (Peterborough, Ontario)
- B Company (Peterborough, Ontario)
- C Company (Peterborough, Ontario)
- D Company (Peterborough, Ontario)

== Battle honours ==
- Ypres, 1915, '17
- Gravenstafel Ridge
- St. Julien
- Festubert, 1915
- Mont Sorrel
- Somme, 1916
- Pozieres
- Flers-Courcelette
- Ancre Heights
- Arras, 1917, '18
- Vimy, 1917
- Arleux
- Scarpe, 1917, '18
- Hill 70
- Passchendaele
- Amiens
- Drocourt-Quéant
- Hindenburg Line
- Canal du Nord
- Pursuit to Mons
- France and Flanders, 1915–18

== See also ==
- Prince of Wales's Regiment (disambiguation)
