= Peterborough Rangers =

The Peterborough Rangers
- Active: 1867-1936
- Country: Canada
- Branch: Canadian Militia
- Type: Rangers
- Role: Infantry
- Part of: Non-Permanent Active Militia
- Garrison/HQ: Peterborough, Ontario
- Engagements: North-West Rebellion; First World War
- Battle honours: See #Battle honours

The Peterborough Rangers was an infantry regiment of the Non-Permanent Active Militia of the Canadian Militia (now the Canadian Army). In 1936, the regiment was amalgamated with the 3rd Prince of Wales' Canadian Dragoons to form The Prince of Wales Rangers (Peterborough Regiment).

== Lineage ==
=== The Peterborough Rangers ===
- Originated on 3 May 1867, in Peterborough, Canada West, as the 57th Peterborough Battalion of Infantry.
- Redesignated on 16 January 1880, as the 57th Battalion of Infantry Peterborough Rangers.
- Redesignated on 8 May 1900, as the 57th Regiment Peterborough Rangers.
- Redesignated on 12 March 1920, as The Peterborough Rangers.
- Amalgamated on 15 December 1936, with the 3rd The Prince of Wales' Canadian Dragoons and the Headquarters and C Company of the 4th Machine Gun Battalion, CMGC, and redesignated as The Prince of Wales Rangers (Peterborough Regiment) (MG).

== Perpetuations ==
- 2nd Battalion (Eastern Ontario Regiment), CEF
- 93rd Battalion (Peterborough), CEF
- 247th Battalion (Victoria & Haliburton), CEF

== History ==
=== Early years ===
With the passing of the Militia Act of 1855, the first of a number of newly-raised independent militia companies were established in and around the Peterborough region of Canada West (now the Province of Ontario).

On 3 May 1867, the 57th Peterborough Battalion of Infantry was authorized for service by the regimentation of seven of these previously authorized independent militia rifle and infantry companies. Its regimental headquarters was at Peterborough and had companies at Peterborough, Ashburnham, Norwood and Hastings.

On 16 January 1880, the battalion was redesignated as the 57th Battalion of Infantry Peterborough Rangers.

=== The North West Rebellion ===
On 10 April 1885, the 57th Battalion of Infantry Peterborough Rangers mobilized a company for active service with The Midland Battalion where it served in the Alberta Column of the North West Field Force. On 24 July 1885, the company was removed from active service.

=== Early 1900s ===
On 8 May 1900, the 57th Battalion of Infantry Peterborough Rangers was redesignated as the 57th Regiment Peterborough Rangers.

=== Great War ===
On 10 August 1914, the 2nd Battalion (Eastern Ontario Regiment), CEF was authorized for service and on 26 September 1914, the battalion embarked for Great Britain as part of the First Contingent of the Canadian Expeditionary Force. On 11 February 1915, the battalion disembarked in France where it fought as part of the 1st Canadian Brigade, 1st Canadian Division in France and Flanders until the end of the war. On 30 August 1920, the 2nd Battalion, CEF, was disbanded.

On 22 December 1915, the 93rd Battalion (Peterborough), CEF was authorized for service and on 15 July 1916, the battalion embarked for Great Britain. After its arrival in the UK, the battalion provided reinforcements to the Canadian Corps in the field. On 6 October 1916, the battalion’s personnel were absorbed by the 39th Reserve Battalion, CEF. On 21 May 1917, the 93rd Battalion, CEF, was disbanded.

On 1 May 1917, the 247th Battalion (Victoria & Haliburton), CEF was authorized for service. On 1 April 1917, the battalion’s personnel were absorbed in Canada by the 235th Battalion, CEF. On 11 April 1918, the 247th Battalion, CEF, was disbanded.

=== 1920s-1930s ===
On 12 March 1920, as a result of the Otter Commission and the following post-war reorganization of the militia, the 57th Regiment Peterborough Rangers was redesignated as The Peterborough Rangers and was reorganized with three battalions (two of them paper-only reserve battalions) to perpetuate the assigned war-raised battalions of the Canadian Expeditionary Force.

As a result of the 1936 Canadian Militia reorganization, on 15 December 1936, The Peterborough Rangers was amalgamated with the 3rd Prince of Wales' Canadian Dragoons and the Headquarters and C Company of the 4th Machine Gun Battalion, CMGC, to form The Prince of Wales Rangers (Peterborough Regiment) – now the 50th Field Artillery Regiment (The Prince of Wales Rangers), RCA (on the Supplementary Order of Battle since 1970).

== Organization ==
=== 57th Peterborough Battalion of Infantry (3 May 1867) ===
- No. 1 Company (first raised on 2 April 1857 as the Peterborough Rifle Company)
- No. 2 Company (first raised on 29 October 1863 as the Lakefield Infantry Company)
- No. 3 Company (first raised on 16 January 1863 as the 1st Peterborough Infantry Company)
- No. 4 Company (first raised on 30 January 1863 as the Asburnham Infantry Company)
- No. 5 Company (first raised on 8 June 1866 as the 2nd Peterborough Infantry Company)
- No. 6 Company (first raised on 17 August 1866 as the Norwood Infantry Company)
- No. 7 Company (first raised on 17 August 1866 as the Hastings Infantry Company)

=== The Peterborough Rangers (12 March 1920) ===
- 1st Battalion (perpetuating the 2nd Battalion, CEF)
- 2nd (Reserve) Battalion (perpetuating the 92nd Battalion, CEF)
- 3rd (Reserve) Battalion (perpetuating the 247th Battalion, CEF)

== Alliances ==
- United Kingdom - The Middlesex Regiment (Duke of Cambridge's Own) (1911-1936)

== Battle honours ==
In 1929, the regiment was awarded battle honours for the Great War. As of 2026 there is a regimental colour laid up in St. John the Evangelist Anglican Church emblazoned with some of these honours.

- Ypres (Note: Selected to be borne on colours and appointments)
  - 1915
  - '17
- Gravenstafel Ridge
- St. Julien
- Festubert, 1915
- Mont Sorrel
- Somme, 1916
- Pozières
- Flers-Courcelette
- Ancre Heights
- Arras
  - 1917
  - '18
- Vimy, 1917
- Arleux
- Scarpe
  - 1917
  - '18
- Hill 70
- Passchendaele
- Amiens
- Drocourt–Quéant
- Hindenburg Line
- Canal du Nord
- Pursuit to Mons
- France and Flanders, 1915–18

== Notable members ==
- Lieutenant Colonel William Nassau Kennedy
