= John H. Paty =

Hawaiian Kingdom businessman (1840–1897)

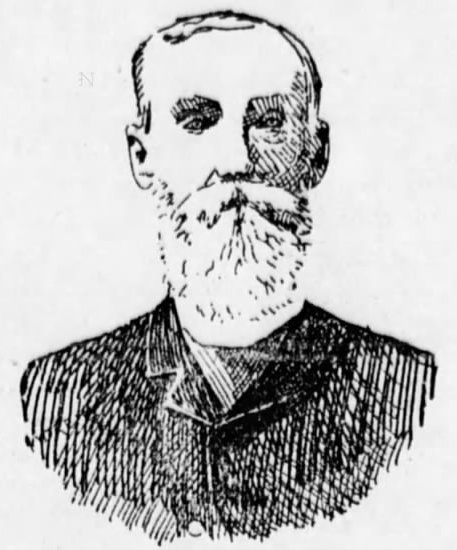
- Born: September 8, 1840; Honolulu, Kingdom of Hawaii
- Died: February 2, 1897 (aged 56); Honolulu, Republic of Hawaii
- Occupation: Businessman
- Spouse: Julia Anthem Bolles
- Children: 5 daughters, 1 son

John Henry Paty (September 8, 1840 – February 2, 1897) was the Consul to the Netherlands for the Kingdom of Hawaii. He was a businessman who served as an auditor or as a trustee of numerous organizations, and was a founding member of both the Planters' Labor and Supply Company and the Oahu Railway and Land Company.

== Background ==
He was the fifth generation of Paty men to bear the name John, and was born to seafaring trader Captain John Paty (1807–1868) and Mary Ann Jefferson Paty (1813–1891). According to Captain Paty's granddaughter, their family was descended from Richard Warren, one of the passengers on the Mayflower, the English ship that transported the first Puritans to North America in 1620, landing at Plymouth Rock. Captain Paty's brother Henry had preceded him to Hawaii, and convinced him to operate out of Honolulu, where he was subsequently appointed by Kamehameha III as Hawaiian Counsel and Naval Commandant for the Northwest Coast. John Henry was born in Honolulu on September 8, 1840, followed by sisters Mary Francesca in 1844, and Emma Theodora in 1850.

== Career ==
Paty was educated at the Royal School in Honolulu, and became a 1st lieutenant in the first company of the Honolulu Rifles. Paty served as Hawaii's Consul to the Netherlands for several years. He was also a Registrar of Conveyances for Oahu. Paty became employed at Bishop and Company Bank in August 1859, and became a full partner in 1875 The company was the principal owner of Kawailoa Ranch He was elected a trustee of Queen's Hospital in 1875; the Board of Trustees then elected him as treasurer. He was also treasurer of the Sailor's Home Society, and was vice president of the Board of Realtors.

The Kingdom of Hawaii began contracting with steamship manufacturers in 1876 for inner-island services, authorizing Samuel G. Wilder as the kingdom's purchasing agent. By 1883, Wilder had formed the Wilder Steamship Company, with Paty as the company auditor. Paty was later a founder and president of Oahu Railroad Company.

On March 20, 1882, Paty joined with six other planters – Edward P. Adams, Samuel T. Alexander, William H. Bailey, William G. Irwin, Alfred S. Hartwell and Z. S. Spalding – to charter the Planters’ Labor and Supply Company as a forum for the Hawaiian sugar industry. When Walter Murray Gibson was appointed Kalākaua's Minister of Foreign Affairs and became de facto head of the king's cabinet ministers on May 20 of the same year, the planters found themselves at constant odds with Gibson over imported labor. The year before, Kalākaua's 1881 world tour had been focused on negotiating plantation labor contracts with countries such as Portugal, China and Japan. Gibson halted the immigration of Portuguese laborers. The planters favored Chinese laborers for economic reasons, but Gibson put restrictions on how many Chinese laborers could enter, and under what conditions. The result was a labor shortage on the plantations. When it came to Japanese laborers, however, Kalākaua had negotiated the labor contract while in Japan. The first 943 contract laborers from Japan arrived with their spouses and children on February 8, 1885.

== Politics ==
Because of ongoing concerns about actions taken by the monarchy under Gibson's tenure as cabinet head, nine businessmen formed a committee to work behind the scenes to effect the outcome of the 1884 election. In addition to Paty, the other members were Joseph Ballard Atherton, William R. Castle, Sanford B. Dole, William Wisner Hall, James A. Hopper, Peter C. Jones, Henry Wentworth Mist and William O. Smith. In 1885, another cabal was formed by thirteen businessmen to foster the election of independent candidates. Paty, Atherton, Castle, Dole, Hall, and Jones were also members of that group. The others were Jonathan Austin, William H. Bailey, B. F. Dillingham, Henry F. Glade, Thomas May, Lorrin A. Thurston and George N. Wilcox. Although some of these individuals later formed the Committee of Safety and were instrumental in the overthrow of the kingdom, Paty was not named in the subsequent Congressional investigation as having taken part in that event.

== Family and death ==
He married American Julia Anthem Bolles (1850–1905) on August 17, 1871. The couple were the parents of five daughters and one son:

- Julia Bishop (1872–1944), married John J. Egan (a.k.a. J. J. Egan), a Honolulu dry goods merchant.
- Mary Frances (1874–1941), married bookkeeper Albert W. Van Valkenburg, an early 20th century proponent of Hawaii's aviation services.
- Annie Elizabeth (1876–1957), married Ernest A. Mott-Smith who became Minister of Foreign Affairs for the Republic of Hawaii, He was the son of John Mott-Smith, a cabinet minister under both Kalākaua and Liliʻuokalani.
- Kate Makee (1879–1935), married Charles Schmidt Weight, an executive with the land development company Amfac.
- Lillian Bowles (1880–1935), married William Gibson Singlehurst, a lifetime employee of Theo H. Davies & Co., one of the Big Five sugar plantation conglomerates.
- Their only son died in infancy.

Paty died on February 3, 1897. Rev. Douglas P. Birnie of Central Union Church conducted the funeral services in the Paty home. The pall bearers who escorted his casket to burial at Nuuanu Cemetery were Peter Cushman Jones, B. F. Dillingham, Rev. Henry Hodges Parker, Captain Fuller, George W. Smith, Joseph O. Carter, Joseph Ballard Atherton, E. Marshall.

== Bibliography ==
- Forbes, David W. (1998). Hawaiian National Bibliography, 1780–1900: 1881–1900. University of Hawaii Press. ISBN 978-0-8248-2636-9.
- Green, Mrs. Edward Craft; Paty, John (December 1935). "Journal of Captain John Paty". California Historical Society Quarterly. 14 (4): 291–346. doi:10.2307/25160601. JSTOR 25160601.
- Hackler, Rhoda E. A. (2006). "Commodore John Paty: Merchant Mariner". Hawaiian Journal of History. 40. hdl:10524/173.
- Kuykendall, Ralph Simpson (1967). The Hawaiian Kingdom 1874–1893, The Kalakaua Dynasty. Vol. 3. Honolulu: University of Hawaii Press. ISBN 978-0-87022-433-1. OCLC 500374815.
- MacLennan, Carol A. (2014). Sovereign Sugar: Industry and Environment in Hawaii. University of Hawai'i Press. ISBN 978-0-8248-4024-2. - Available at Project MUSE
- US Government (1894). Congressional Record: Proceedings and Debates of the Congress. US Government Printing Office.
