= Prince of Wales's Regiment =

Prince of Wales's Regiment is a title that has been carried by many regiments of the British, Indian, Australian and Canadian armies and may refer to:

== British Army ==
=== Infantry regiments ===
- West Yorkshire Regiment (Prince of Wales's Own) formed 1685, disbanded 1958
- 75th Regiment of Foot (Prince of Wales's Regiment) formed 1778, disbanded 1783
- 82nd Regiment of Foot (Prince of Wales's Volunteers) formed 1793, disbanded 1881
- 87th (The Prince of Wales's Irish) Regiment of Foot formed 1793, disbanded 1881
- Prince of Wales's Own Civil Service Rifles formed 1798, disbanded 1921
- 98th (Prince of Wales's) Regiment of Foot formed 1824, disbanded 1881
- 100th (Prince of Wales's Royal Canadian) Regiment of Foot formed 1858, disbanded 1881
- Prince of Wales's Volunteers (South Lancashire Regiment) formed 1881, disbanded 1958
- Prince of Wales's (North Staffordshire Regiment) formed 1881, disbanded 1959
- Prince of Wales's Leinster Regiment formed 1881, disbanded 1922
- Prince of Wales's Own Regiment of Yorkshire formed 1958, disbanded 2006
- The Lancashire Regiment (Prince of Wales's Volunteers) formed 1958, disbanded 1970
- The Staffordshire Regiment (The Prince of Wales's) formed 1959, disbanded 2007

=== Cavalry regiments ===
- 3rd Dragoon Guards (Prince of Wales's) formed 1685, disbanded 1922
- 10th (The Prince of Wales's Own) Regiment of (Light) Dragoons (Hussars) formed 1715, disbanded 1969
- 12th (Prince of Wales's Royal) Lancers formed 1715, disbanded 1960
- 3rd Carabiniers (Prince of Wales's Dragoon Guards) formed 1922, disbanded 1971
- 9th/12th Royal Lancers (Prince of Wales's) formed 1960
- Royal Hussars (Prince of Wales's Own) formed 1969, disbanded 1992

== British Indian Army ==
=== Infantry regiments ===
- 2nd (Prince of Wales's Own) Regiment of Bombay Infantry (Grenadiers) formed 1759, disbanded 1922
- 1st Prince of Wales's Own Gurkha Rifles formed 1815
- 2nd Prince of Wales Own Gurkha Rifles formed 1815, disbanded 1994
- 14th Prince of Wales's Own Ferozepore Sikhs formed 1846, disbanded 1922
- 4th Prince of Wales's Own Gurkha Rifles formed 1857
- 37th (Prince of Wales's Own) Dogras formed 1887, disbanded 1922
- 51st The Prince of Wales' Own Sikhs (Frontier Force) formed 1846, merged with 12th Frontier Force Regiment in 1922

=== Cavalry regiments ===
- 11th Prince of Wales's Own Lancers formed 1857, disbanded 1922
- 14th Prince of Wales's Own Scinde Horse formed 1922, disbanded 1947

== Australian Army ==
=== Cavalry regiments ===
- 4th/19th Prince of Wales's Light Horse formed 1948

== Canadian Army ==
=== Infantry regiments ===
- 1st Regiment, Prince of Wales' Fusiliers formed 1859, reorganised and redesignated in 1911 as The Canadian Grenadier Guards
- The Prince of Wales Rangers (Peterborough Regiment) formed 1936, converted to artillery in 1946 - now the 50th Field Artillery Regiment (The Prince of Wales Rangers), RCA

=== Cavalry regiments ===
- 3rd Prince of Wales' Canadian Dragoons formed 1875, amalgamated in 1936 with The Peterborough Rangers to form The Prince of Wales Rangers (Peterborough Regiment)

== British North America ==
- Prince of Wales' American Regiment formed in 1776/77, disbanded 1783
