= 3rd Dragoons =

The 3rd Dragoons or 3rd Dragoon Regiment may refer to the following military units:

- 3rd The King's Own Hussars, a former British Army cavalry regiment: previously the 3rd (King's Own) Regiment of Dragoons and the 3rd (The King's Own) Regiment of (Light) Dragoons
- 3rd Prince of Wales' Canadian Dragoons, a Canadian Army regiment active 1875-1936
- 3rd Dragoon Regiment (France)
- Jutland Dragoon Regiment (Danish: Jydske Dragonregiment), a Royal Danish Army armoured regiment: previously the 3rd Dragoon Regiment (Danish: 3. Dragonregiment)

== See also ==
- 3rd Dragoon Guards
