= Volney V. Ashford =

American soldier (1844–1900)

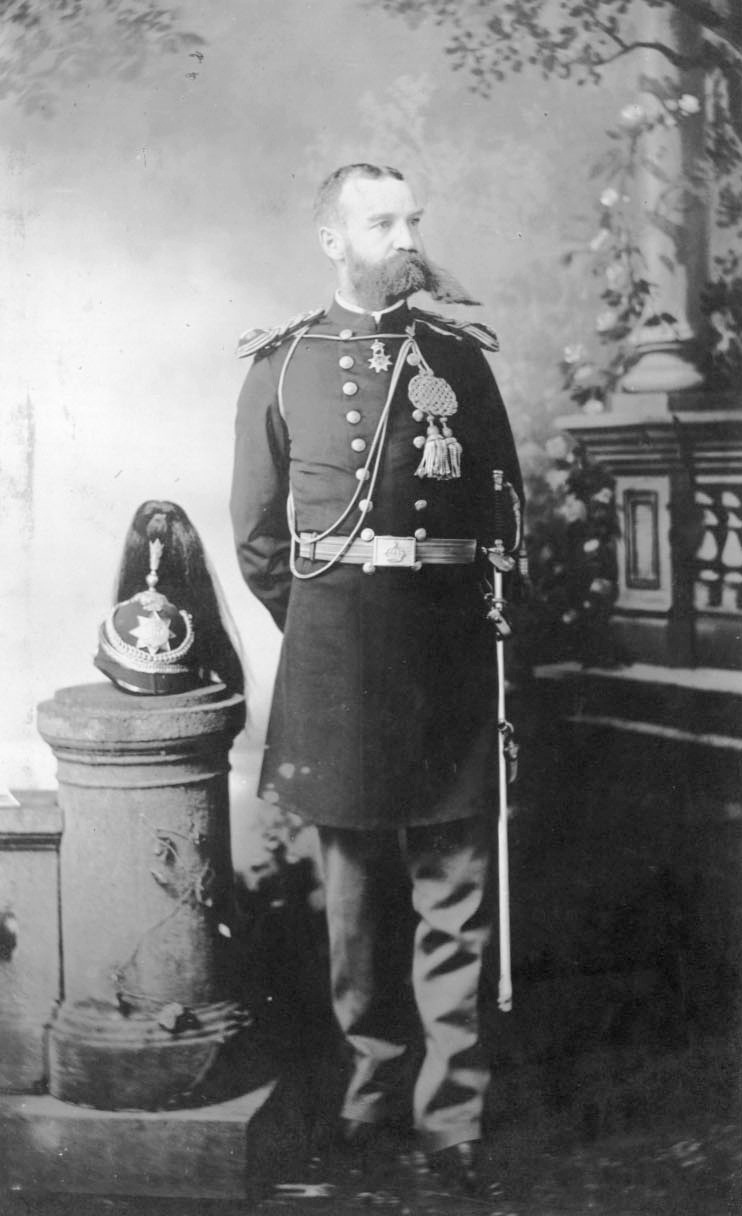
- Ashford, c. 1887
- Born: 1844; Port Hope, Canada West
- Died: 21 March 1900 (aged 55–56); Oakland, California
- Burial place: Mountain View Cemetery
- Military career
- Allegiance: United States (Union); Canada; Kingdom of Hawaii
- Branch: Union Army; Canadian Militia; Honolulu Rifles
- Rank: Quartermaster Sergeant (Union); Captain (Canada); Colonel (Hawaii)
- Nickname: V.V.
- Units: Union Light Cavalry; 3rd Prince of Wales' Canadian Dragoons; Honolulu Rifles
- Commands: Honolulu Rifles
- Conflicts: American Civil War; Hawaiian Revolutions of 1887; Wilcox Rebellion of 1889; 1895 Counter-Revolution in Hawaii

Volney Vallencourt "V. V." Ashford (1844 – 21 March 1900) was an American soldier and involved in 19th-century rebellion in Hawaii.

== Military career ==
Ashford joined the Union Army in 1863 after leaving his home in Port Hope, Ontario. He was a British citizen since Canada was a territory of the United Kingdom. He became a Quartermaster Sergeant in the Grizwold Light Cavalry during the American Civil War. After the Civil War, Ashford, became a surveyor for the Beaverton railway and joined the Prince of Wales' Canadian Dragoons where he made Captain. He was widowed twice in addition to the death of his daughter. In 1884, his brother and future Attorney General of Hawaii, Clarence W. Ashford, invited him to visit Honolulu. After moving to Hawaii he joined the Honolulu Rifles, a militia. Ashford became responsible for the Rifles' growth from 100 men in 1886 to a battalion of three companies in 1887 and recognition as a paramilitary force. He rapidly moved up the ranks entering with his Canadian rank of Captain, he rose through Major and Lieutenant Colonel becoming Colonel in 1887, the highest rank and commander of the Rifles itself.

== Ashford and Annexation of Hawaii ==
Shortly after becoming Colonel, a group of conspirators within the Missionary Party wanted to annex Hawaii to the United States. Ashford believed the monarchy was corrupt and was recruited to what would be known as the Hawaiian League. The Hawaiian League used the Rifles in the Rebellion of 1887 a bloodless revolution to enact the Bayonet Constitution. In 1889, the Rifles did battle with forces of Robert Wilcox in the Wilcox Rebellion. Upon Wilcox's surrender, he offered Ashford his sabre; Ashford accepted the surrender but turned down the sabre. Ashford began to regret his support for the Hawaiian League. He came to believe that the League was more corrupt than the monarchy at advancing their own interests rather than improving Hawaii. He joined the Liberal Party, a third party that supported neither the Monarchy nor the Missionaries. Ashford was arrested in a plot to overthrown both the Monarchy and Bayonet Constitution known as the Burlesque Conspiracy and went into exile. His brother took his place in his absence as commander of the Honolulu Rifles. After the Overthrow of the Hawaiian monarchy, Ashford returned to Hawaii and retired from his position as commander of the Rifles. He was a strong supporter of annexation, but with the establishment of the Republic of Hawaii he gave little support for the new government which he believed was corrupt and later revealed at his military tribunal, disapproved of the mistreatment of Hawaiians by the government. Ashford was approached by counter-revolutionaries as a consultant to restore the monarchy.

== Exile and illness ==
The counter-revolution ended in failure in 1895 and Ashford was charged with misprision of treason and received one year in prison and a $1000 fine. Due to his ill health he was given the option of the one-year sentence or become exiled (if he returned he would receive his original sentence). After accepting exile he moved to California, his brother moved in with him under similar circumstances of exile. Ashford died on March 21, 1900, in Oakland, California.
