= Committee of Safety (Hawaii) =

Organization

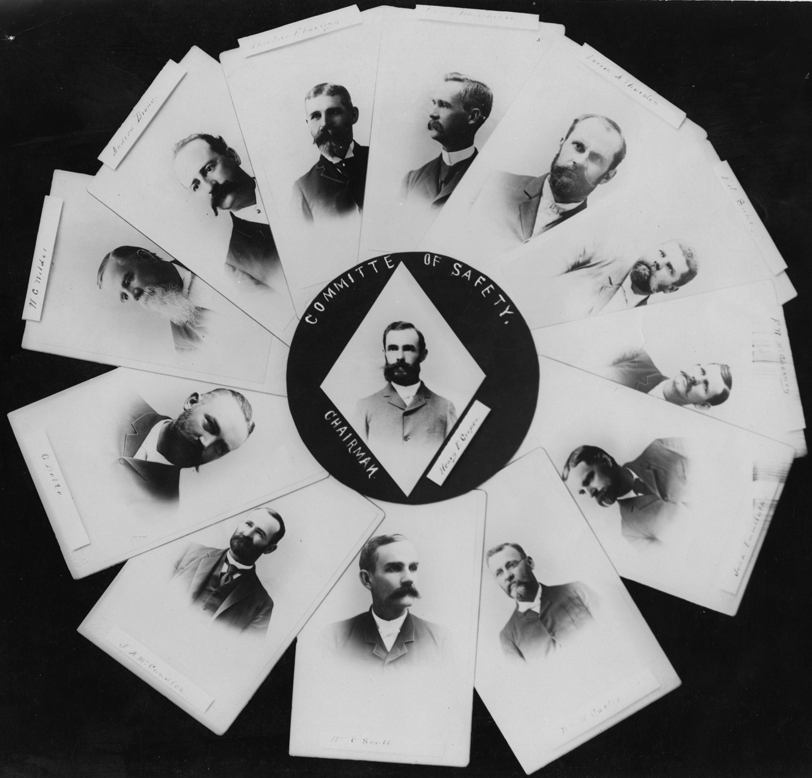
- The Committee of Safety
- Successor: Provisional Government
- Formation: 1887
- Dissolved: 1893
- Type: Secret society
- Purpose: Overthrow of the royal government of Hawaii, annexation by the United States
- Location: Oʻahu, Hawaii
- Members: Elite business and political leaders
- Official language: English
- Unofficial leader: Lorrin A. Thurston
- Main organ: Committee of Thirteen, Committee of Safety
- Affiliations: Honolulu Rifles

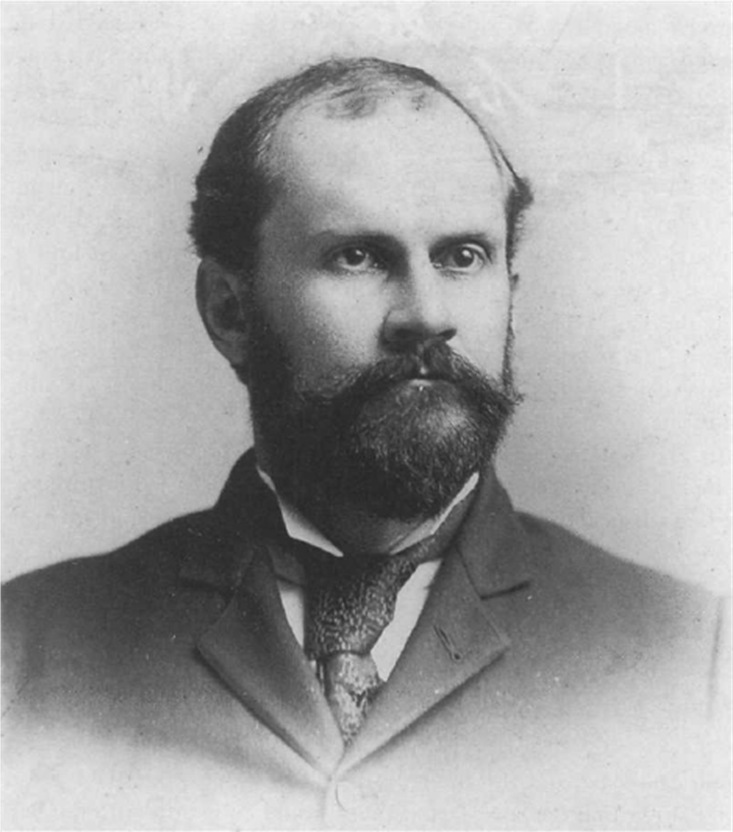
Lorrin A. Thurston long advocated annexation by the United States

The Committee of Safety, formally the Citizen's Committee of Public Safety, was a 13-member group of the Annexation Club. The group was composed of mostly Hawaiian subjects of American descent and American citizens who were members of the Missionary Party, as well as some foreign residents in the Hawaiian Kingdom. The group planned and carried out the overthrow of the Hawaiian Kingdom on January 17, 1893. The goal of this group was to achieve annexation of Hawaii by the United States.

The new independent Republic of Hawaii government was thwarted in this goal by the administration of President Grover Cleveland. It was not until 1898, under the administration of William McKinley, that the United States Congress approved a joint resolution of annexation, creating the U.S. Territory of Hawaii.

== Formation ==
The Committee of Safety originated from a leadership group when members of the Missionary Party began to run as Independent Party candidates. For the elections of 1884 the Missionary Party strictly ran all candidates as Independent Party candidates. To ensure that Missionaries were on the Independent ticket the "Committee of Nine" was formed January 14, 1883, to assume the leadership position of the Independent Party. The Committee of Nine were staunchly loyal to the Missionary Party, having social and economic philosophies that reflected the Missionary values. The Independent Party won 13 seats and was the minority party in the Hawaii legislature. For the following elections of 1886 the committee reconvened, this time calling themselves the "Committee of Thirteen" due to the change in members. Their intent was to make the Independent Party the majority party in the legislature. At the end of the elections the Independents won ten seats, a net loss of three seats.

== Hawaiian League ==
In January 1887, the Committee of Thirteen formed a secret society called the Hawaiian League. The founding of the organization was an illegal act under Kingdom law. Membership required one to swear the following oath -

"I do solemnly promise upon my honor, that I will keep secret the existence and purposes of this League, that I will not, in my position as a member of any military organization, oppose or oppress the white citizens of this Kingdom, that I will stand by and support my military supervisors in their necessary efforts to protect the white community of this Kingdom against any arbitrary or oppressive action of the Government, which may threaten the lives, liberty, or property of the people and will at all hazards protect and defend the members of the League who may be jeopardized in its service."

No official records were kept, but Lorrin A. Thurston (the grandson of American missionaries Asa Thurston and Lorrin Andrews) drafted the group's constitution and maintained a log of the group's 405 members. Its members were of European or American descent and varied citizenship. Ralph Kuykendall notes that "[i]t was a haole organization; there are no identifiable Hawaiian names on the roll, but there were a few members of part-Hawaiian ancestry." However, Kuykendall gives no further explanation or evidence to support the latter claim. There were members who were Hawaiian citizens of non-Hawaiian descent.

Although its political wing changed its name from the "Missionary Party" to "Reform Party", many Hawaiian League members wanted annexation by the United States, not just monarchal reform. The Hawaiian League was also called the Annexation Club, although not often in public.

The Hawaiian League was also supported by a German social and political group known as Drei Hundert, organized by Charles W. Zeigler.

Hawaiian League members exerted substantial control over the Honolulu Rifles, gaining de facto control by early 1887. The Honolulu Rifles consisted of approximately 200 armed, non-Hawaiian men under the command of enthusiastic annexationist Volney V. Ashford. The company officers of the Honolulu Rifles were also Hawaiian League members. In June 1887, the Hawaiian League used the Rifles to force King Kalākaua to enact the Bayonet Constitution which limited his power. After Queen Liliʻuokalani came to power in 1891, she attempted to restore power to the throne. This caused the group to act again.

== Overthrow ==
The precipitating event leading to the overthrow was the attempt by Queen Liliʻuokalani to promulgate a new constitution which would have strengthened the power of the monarch relative to the legislature in which Euro-American business elites held disproportionate power, a political situation that was a direct result of the 1887 constitution. The conspirators' stated goals were to depose the queen, overthrow the monarchy, and seek Hawaii's annexation to the United States.

On January 16, the Marshal of the Kingdom Charles B. Wilson was tipped off to the imminent planned coup. Wilson requested warrants to arrest the 13-member Committee of Safety and put the Kingdom under martial law. Because the members had strong political ties with United States Government Minister John L. Stevens, the requests were repeatedly denied, fearing if approved, the arrests would escalate the situation. After a failed negotiation with Thurston, Wilson began to collect his men for the confrontation. Wilson and Captain of the Royal Household Guard Samuel Nowlein had rallied a force of 496 men who were kept at hand to protect the Queen.

The Revolution ignited on January 17 when a policeman was shot and wounded while trying to stop a wagon carrying weapons to the Honolulu Rifles. The Committee of Safety feared the shooting would bring government forces to root out the conspirators and stop the coup before it could begin. The Rifles garrisoned Ali'iolani Hale across the street from ʻIolani Palace and waited for the Queen's response.

As these events were unfolding, the Committee of Safety expressed concern for the safety and property of American residents in Honolulu. United States Government Minister John L. Stevens, advised about these supposed threats to non-combatant American lives and property by the Committee of Safety, obliged their request and summoned a company of uniformed U.S. Marines from the USS Boston and two companies of U.S. sailors to land on the Kingdom and take up positions at the U.S. Legation, Consulate, and Arion Hall on the afternoon of January 16, 1893. 162 sailors and marines aboard the USS Boston in Honolulu Harbor came ashore well-armed but under orders of neutrality. The sailors and marines did not enter the Palace grounds or take over any buildings, and never fired a shot, but their presence served to intimidate royalist defenders. Historian William Russ states, "the injunction to prevent fighting of any kind made it impossible for the monarchy to protect itself." Due to the Queen's desire "to avoid any collision of armed forces, and perhaps the loss of life" for her subjects and after some deliberation, at the urging of advisers and friends, the Queen ordered her forces to surrender. The Honolulu Rifles took over government buildings, disarmed the Royal Guard, and declared a Provisional Government.

The Committee of Safety issued the following proclamation, read aloud on January 17 by its chairman Henry E. Cooper to a large crowd assembled in front of the royal residence ʻIolani Palace:

"First – The Hawaiian monarchial system of government is hereby abrogated.

Second – A Provisional Government for the control and management of public affairs and the protection of public peace is hereby established, to exist until terms of union with the United States of America have been negotiated and agreed upon".

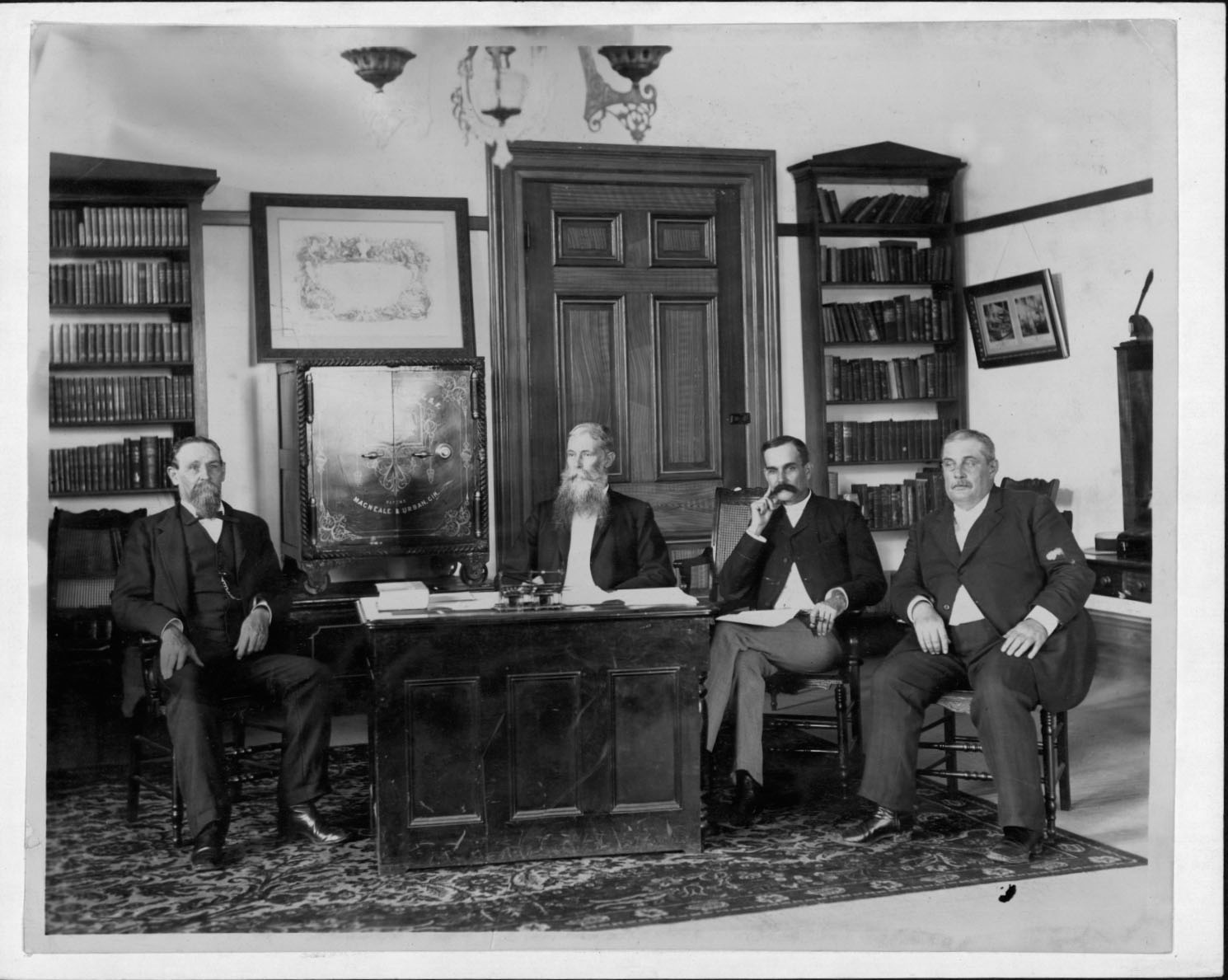
Executive council of the Provisional Government (left to right): James A. King, Sanford B. Dole, W. O. Smith and P. C. Jones

The Hawaiian League unofficially adopted the American flag to appeal to the US and promote annexation. The flag was raised over ʻIolani Palace by Stevens on January 17, 1893. The flag was eventually lowered by James H. Blount that April for spreading a false presumption that the US had taken control.

== International response ==
During the overthrow, the Japanese Imperial Navy gunboat Naniwa was docked at Pearl Harbor. The gunboat's commander, Heihachiro Togo, who later commanded the Japanese battleship fleet at Tsushima, refused to accede to the Provisional Government's demands that he strike the colors of the Kingdom, but later lowered the colors on order of the Japanese Government. Along with every other international legations in Honolulu, the Japanese Consulate-General, Suburo Fujii, quickly recognized the Provisional Government as the legitimate successor to the monarchy.

Every government with a diplomatic presence in Hawaii recognized the Provisional Government within 48 hours of the overthrow, including the United States. Countries recognizing the new Provisional Government included Chile, Austria-Hungary, Mexico, Russia, the Netherlands, Germany, Sweden, Spain, Japan, Italy, Portugal, Great Britain, Denmark, Belgium, China, Peru, and France. When the Republic of Hawaii was declared on July 4, 1894, immediate recognition was given by every nation with diplomatic relations with Hawaii, except for Britain, whose response came in November.

== Members of the committees ==
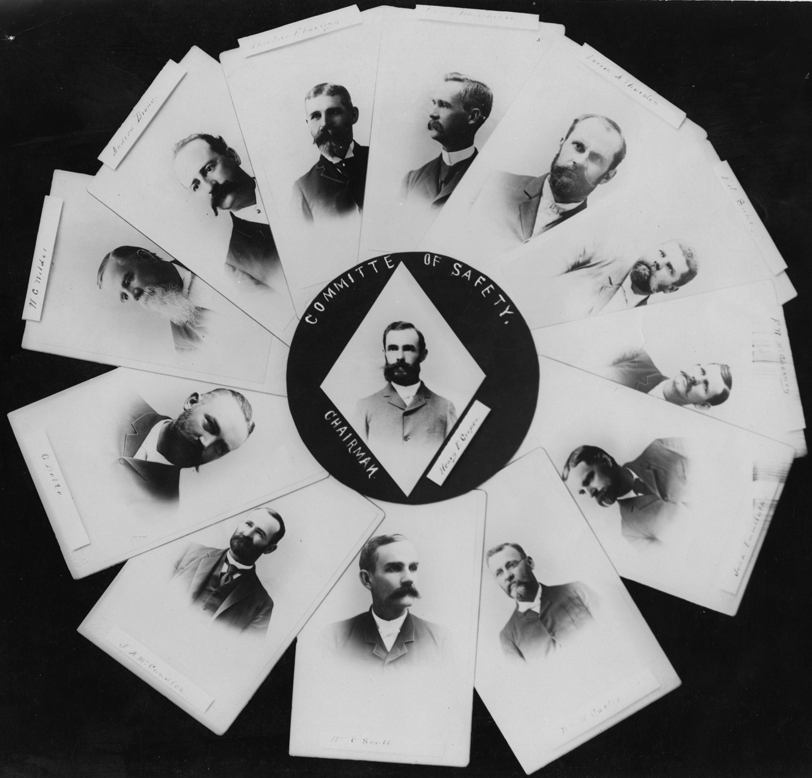
The Committee of Safety, formally the Citizen's Committee of Public Safety, was a 13-member group of the Hawaiian League also known as the Annexation Club. Henry E. Cooper, chairman, Theodore F. Lansing, Henry Waterhouse, Lorrin A. Thurston, Ed Suhr, F. W. McChesney, John Emmeluth, Wm. R. Castle, Wm. O. Smith, J. A. McCandless, C. Bolte, W. C. Wilder, and Andrew Brown.

=== Committee of Nine ===
- Joseph B. Atherton
- William R. Castle
- Sanford B. Dole
- William W. Hall (1841–1910) Business partner of his printer father Edwin Oscar Hall
- James A. Hopper (1831–1900)
- Peter C. Jones
- Henry W. Mist (1833–1895)
- John H. Paty
- William O. Smith

=== Committee of Thirteen ===
- Joseph B. Atherton
- Jonathan Austin
- William H. Bailey
- William R. Castle
- Benjamin F. Dillingham
- Sanford B. Dole
- Henry F. Glade (1883–1894) German consul to Hawaii
- William W. Hall
- Peter C. Jones
- Thomas May
- John H. Paty
- Lorrin A. Thurston

=== Committee of Safety ===
Six Hawaiian subjects, five American citizens, a German subject, and a British subject signed the January 16 letter:

Hawaiian Kingdom subjects:

- Crister Bolte, naturalized Hawaiian subject of German birth, member
- William Richards Castle, Hawaiian subject, born in Honolulu 1849, attorney general for Kalākaua 1876, Hawaiian legislator 1878–88, member
- Chairman Henry Ernest Cooper, American citizen who arrived in 1890, denizen of the Kingdom, named chairman at mass meeting January 14, 1893
- William Owen Smith, Hawaiian subject, born on Kauaʻi 1838 of American missionaries, member
- Lorrin A. Thurston, Hawaiian subject, born in Hawaii of American grandparents, member
- Henry Waterhouse, naturalized Hawaiian subject of Tasmanian birth, came to Hawaiʻi 1851, member
- William C. Wilder, naturalized Hawaiian subject, brother of Samuel Gardner Wilder, member

Non-subject Members:

- Andrew Brown, Scottish, member
- John Emmeluth, American citizen, member
- Theodore F. Lansing, American citizen, member
- John A. McCandless, American citizen, member
- Frederick W. McChesney, American citizen, member
- Edward Suhr, German citizen, member

Others who assisted in the overthrow:

- Charles L. Carter, American, naturalized Hawaiian subject, member, son of Henry A. P. Carter, brother of George R. Carter, died during the 1895 counter-revolution
- Samuel Mills Damon, Hawaiian subject with American parents, vice president of Provisional Government
- Sanford B. Dole, Hawaiian subject with American parents, selected to head Provisional Government and Republic
- Peter Cushman Jones, American, naturalized Hawaiian subject, provisional government minister of finance
- James A. King, Scottish, named minister of interior

== See also ==
- 1887 Constitution of the Hawaiian Kingdom
- Reform Party of the Hawaiian Kingdom
- Provisional Government of Hawaii
- Republic of Hawaii
- Territory of Hawai'i
