= 3rd Prince of Wales' Canadian Dragoons =

- Active: 1875 - 1936
- Country: Canada
- Branch: Canadian Militia
- Type: Dragoons
- Role: Cavalry
- Part of: Non-Permanent Active Militia
- Garrison/HQ: Cobourg, Ontario
- Mottos: German: Ich Dien, lit. 'I serve'

The 3rd Prince of Wales' Canadian Dragoons was a cavalry regiment of the Non-Permanent Active Militia of the Canadian Militia (now the Canadian Army). In December 1936, the 3rd Dragoons were amalgamated with The Peterborough Rangers to form The Prince of Wales Rangers (Peterborough Regiment).

== Lineage ==
=== 3rd Prince of Wales' Canadian Dragoons ===
- Originated on 30 April 1875, in Cobourg, Ontario, as the 3rd Provisional Regiment of Cavalry.
- Redesignated on 14 October 1881, as the 3rd Provisional Regiment of Cavalry, The Prince of Wales' Canadian Dragoons.
- Redesignated on 25 November 1892, as the 3rd Regiment of Cavalry, The Prince of Wales' Canadian Dragoons.
- Redesignated on 1 January 1893, as the 3rd The Prince of Wales' Canadian Dragoons.
- Amalgamated on 15 December 1936, with The Peterborough Rangers and the Headquarters and C Company of the 4th Machine Gun Battalion, CMGC, and Redesignated as The Prince of Wales Rangers (Peterborough Regiment) (MG).

== History ==
=== Early history ===
The 3rd Dragoons were originally formed on 30 April 1875, as the 3rd Provisional Regiment of Cavalry. Its regimental headquarters was established at Cobourg and had troops stationed at Cobourg, Port Hope and Peterborough.

On 14 October 1881, the regiment were Redesignated as the 3rd Provisional Regiment of Cavalry, The Prince of Wales’ Canadian Dragoons.

On 25 November 1892, the regiment were again Redesignated as the 3rd Regiment of Cavalry, The Prince of Wales' Canadian Dragoons.

On 1 January 1893, the regiment were for the final time Redesignated as the 3rd The Prince of Wales' Canadian Dragoons.

=== 1920s–1930s ===
During the post-WWI years, the 3rd Dragoons were authorized a Reserve unit under Canadian Militia General Order 185 dated 1 November 1920.

On 15 December 1936, as part of the 1936 Canadian Militia Reorganization, the 3rd Prince of Wales' Canadian Dragoons were Amalgamated with The Peterborough Rangers along with the Headquarters and "C" Company of the 4th Machine Gun Battalion, Canadian Machine Gun Corps, to form The Prince of Wales Rangers (Peterborough Regiment) (now the 50th Field Artillery Regiment (The Prince of Wales Rangers), RCA which is currently on the Supplementary Order of Battle).

== Organization ==
=== 3rd Provisional Regiment of Cavalry (30 April 1875) ===
- No. 1 Troop (Cobourg) (first raised on 6 March 1856 as The Cobourg Volunteer Militia Troop of Cavalry. Redesignated on 28 August 1868 as 1st Troop, The Northumberland and Durham Squadron of Cavalry).
- No. 2 Troop (Port Hope, ON) (first raised on 3 September 1857 as 1st Troop of Volunteer Militia Cavalry of the County of Durham)
- No. 3 Troop
- No. 4 Troop (Peterborough, ON) (first raised 23 May 1872 as The Peterborough Militia Troop of Cavalry).

== Notable members ==
- Captain Volney V. Ashford

== See also ==
- Prince of Wales's Regiment (disambiguation)
- List of regiments of cavalry of the Canadian Militia (1900–1920)
