= Honolulu Rifles =

Two 19th-century Hawaiian military units

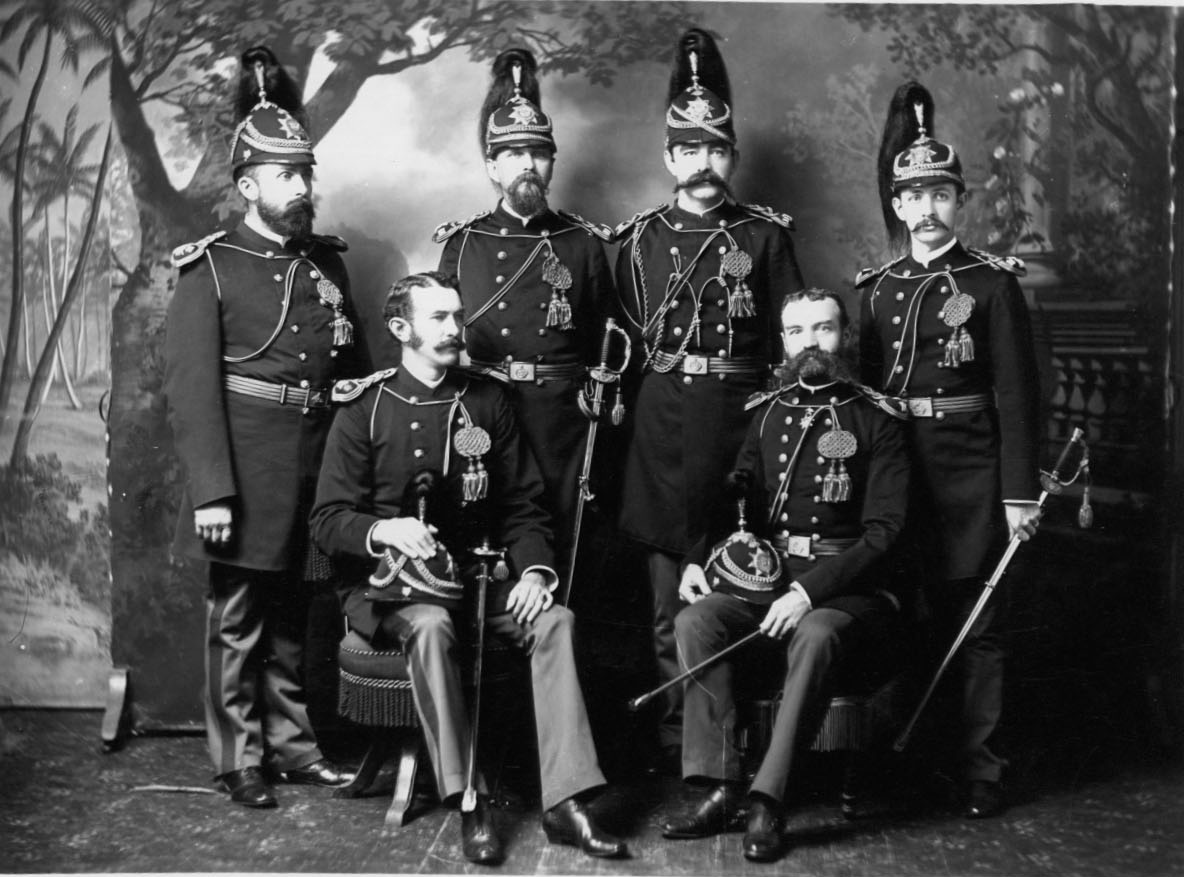
- Honolulu Rifles in full regalia
- Leaders: Charles T. Gulick (first company); Volney V. Ashford (second company)
- Dates active: 1857–1874; 1884–1890

The Honolulu Rifles were the name of two volunteer military companies of the Hawaiian Kingdom.

== First company ==
In 1857, the First Hawaiian Cavalry, an artillery and infantry company which was originally established in 1852, was renamed the Honolulu Rifles and changed to solely an infantry unit. The unit was first commanded by Captain R. Coady, and later by Captain Charles T. Gulick. It was disbanded in 1874 after failing to respond during the Honolulu Courthouse riot, although their founding constitution stipulated that only the government could call on them and no command was ever received at the time of the insurrection.

== Second company ==
The second company was reorganized in the spring of 1884 with the approval of the cabinet and King Kalakaua who gave the group its name. The organizations first use was on April 26, 1885 at the death of the Dowager Queen Emma, to stand guard at her residence. The reorganization held little prominence until after 1886 when the company came into the leadership of Volney V. Ashford, who had extensive military experience with the United States during the Civil war and later with the Canadian Militia. The company began its rise when it won a drill competition at Kalakaua's 50th birthday celebration. The Rifles were a part of the social community of Hawaii and in 1887 hosted an exhibition and dance for the community, attended by most of the political figures of the day, where the king presented them with the flag of the Kingdom.

The ranks of the reorganization grew significantly after January 1887 when it adopted a resolution to become subject to an act of 1886 "To organize the military forces of the kingdom". By March of that year it split into two companies, A and B, forming a battalion. The following month, Portuguese residents formed another company that became company C by May 25. The act of 1886 required a Commander-in-Chief of the rank of lieutenant general to oversee the military forces of the Kingdom. John O. Dominis was given this position while the King himself, under this act, was the Supreme Commander, referred to as Generalissimo. Eventually the act of 1886 would be deemed unconstitutional.

The Honolulu Rifles were disbanded on August 23, 1890.

At what point the Rifles became part of the Hawaiian League known as the Committee of Safety is still somewhat unclear. More than likely the expansion of the company coincided with the formation of the Hawaiian League.
