= 235th Battalion, CEF =

The 235th Battalion, CEF was a unit in the Canadian Expeditionary Force during the First World War. Based in Bowmanville, Ontario, the unit began recruiting in the Spring of 1916 in Northumberland and Durham Counties. After sailing to England in May 1917, the battalion was absorbed into the 3rd Reserve Battalion on May 14, 1917. The 235th Battalion, CEF had one Officer Commanding: Lieut-Col. S. B. Scobell.
