= 50th Field Artillery Regiment (The Prince of Wales Rangers), RCA =

50th Field Artillery Regiment (The Prince of Wales Rangers), Royal Canadian Artillery
- Active: 6 July 1960–1 April 1970
- Country: Canada
- Branch: Army
- Type: Field artillery
- Part of: Royal Regiment of Canadian Artillery
- Garrison/HQ: Peterborough, Ontario
- Mottos: Ubique (Latin for 'everywhere'), quo fas et gloria ducunt (Latin for 'whither right and glory lead')
- March: Quick: "The British Grenadiers"
- Engagements: none (see article for perpetuated units)

The 50th Field Artillery Regiment (The Prince of Wales Rangers), Royal Canadian Artillery was a Canadian Army Reserve artillery regiment based in Peterborough, Ontario. The regiment exists "on paper" on the Supplementary Order of Battle.

The regiment was created in 1960 from the merger of 50th Medium Anti-Aircraft Artillery Regiment (The Prince of Wales Rangers), RCA - originally the 57th Peterborough Battalion of Infantry formed in 1867 and the 45th Medium Battery, RCA - originally as 45th Canadian Volunteer Militia and then as 45th West Durham Battalion of Infantry.

In 2015, the Canadian Forces authorized the award of an honorary distinction to The Prince of Wales Rangers (Peterborough Regiment), if and when it is ever activated from the SOB and converted to an armour or infantry unit: the wartime badge of the Stormont, Dundas and Glengarry Highlanders (SD&GH) with the year dates 1944–45 in recognition of the role played by the PWR in the mobilization of the Canadian Active Service Force unit of the SD&GH. This badge would be emblazoned on the unit's guidon or regimental colour.

== Perpetuations ==
- 4th Brigade, CFA, CEF
- 2nd Battalion (Eastern Ontario Regiment), CEF
- 93rd Battalion (Peterborough), CEF
- 109th Battalion (Victoria & Haliburton), CEF
- 247th Battalion (Victoria & Haliburton), CEF
- 252nd Battalion (Lindsay), CEF
- 4th Battalion, CMGC, CEF
- 4th Battery, CFA, CEF
- 45th Depot Battery, CFA, CEF

== Lineage ==
=== 50th Field Artillery Regiment (The Prince of Wales Rangers), RCA ===
- Originated on 3 May 1867 in Peterborough, Ontario, as the 57th Peterborough Battalion of Infantry.
- Redesignated on 16 January 1880 as the 57th Battalion of Infantry Peterborough Rangers.
- Redesignated on 8 May 1900 as the 57th Regiment Peterborough Rangers.
- Redesignated on 12 March 1920 as The Peterborough Rangers.
- Amalgamated on 15 December 1936 with the 3rd The Prince of Wales' Canadian Dragoons and the Headquarters and C Company of the 4th Machine Gun Battalion, CMGC, and redesignated as The Prince of Wales Rangers (Peterborough Regiment) (MG).
- Redesignated on 5 March 1942 as the 2nd (Reserve) Battalion, The Prince of Wales Rangers (Peterborough Regiment).
- Redesignated on 1 June 1945 as The Prince of Wales Rangers (Peterborough Regiment).
- Converted on 1 April 1946 from infantry to artillery, and redesignated as the 50th Heavy Anti-Aircraft Regiment (The Prince of Wales Rangers), RCA.
- Redesignated on 22 August 1955 as the 50th Medium Anti-Aircraft Regiment (The Prince of Wales Rangers), RCA.
- Redesignated on 12 April 1960 50th Medium Anti-Aircraft Artillery Regiment (The Prince of Wales Rangers), RCA.
- Amalgamated on 6 July 1960 with the 45th Medium Battery, RCA, and redesignated as the 50th Field Artillery Regiment (The Prince of Wales Rangers), RCA.
- Reduced to nil strength on 1 April 1970 and transferred to the Supplementary Order of Battle.

=== 3rd Prince of Wales' Canadian Dragoons ===
- Originated on 30 April 1875 in Cobourg, Ontario, as the 3rd Provisional Regiment of Cavalry.
- Redesignated on 14 October 1881 as the 3rd Provisional Regiment of Cavalry, The Prince of Wales' Canadian Dragoons.
- Redesignated on 25 November 1892 as the 3rd Regiment of Cavalry, The Prince of Wales' Canadian Dragoons.
- Redesignated on 1 January 1893 as the 3rd The Prince of Wales' Canadian Dragoons.
- Amalgamated on 15 December 1936 with The Peterborough Rangers and the Headquarters and C Company of the 4th Machine Gun Battalion, CMGC, and redesignated as The Prince of Wales Rangers (Peterborough Regiment) (MG).

=== 4th Machine Gun Battalion, CMGC ===
- Originated on 1 June 1919 in Kingston, Ontario, as the 4th Machine Gun Brigade, CMGC.
- Redesignated on 15 September 1924 as the 4th Machine Gun Battalion, CMGC.
- Amalgamated on 15 December 1936 with The Peterborough Rangers and the 3rd The Prince of Wales' Canadian Dragoons, and redesignated as The Prince of Wales Rangers (Peterborough Regiment) (MG).

=== 45th Medium Battery, RCA ===
- Originated on 2 February 1920 in Cornwall, Ontario, as the 45th Battery, CFA.
- Redesignated on 1 July 1925 as the 45th Field Battery, CA.
- Redesignated on 3 June 1935 as the 45th Field Battery, RCA.
- Amalgamated on 15 December 1936 with The Victoria and Haliburton Regiment, and redesignated as the 45th Field Battery (Howitzer), RCA.
- Redesignated on 7 November 1940 as the 45th (Reserve) Field Battery (Howitzer), RCA.
- Redesignated on 20 May 1942 as the 45th/56th (Reserve) Field Battery, RCA.
- Redesignated on 1 April 1946 as the 45th Field Battery, RCA.
- Redesignated on 19 June 1947 as the 45th Field Battery (Self-propelled), RCA.
- Amalgamated on 1 September 1954 with the 4th Field Regiment (Self- propelled), RCA and the 56th Field Battery (Self-propelled), RCA, and redesignated as the 45th Medium Battery, RCA.
- Amalgamated on 6 July 1960 with the 50th Medium Anti-Aircraft Artillery Regiment (The Prince of Wales Rangers), RCA and redesignated as the 50th Field Artillery Regiment (The Prince of Wales Rangers), RCA.

=== The Victoria and Haliburton Regiment ===
- Originated on 16 November 1866 in Bowmanville, Ontario, as the 45th West Durham Battalion of Infantry.
- Redesignated on 1 January 1898 as the 45th Victoria Battalion of Infantry.
- Redesignated on 8 May 1900 as the 45th Victoria Regiment.
- Redesignated on 16 July 1917 as the 45th Victoria and Haliburton Regiment.
- Redesignated on 12 March 1920 as The Victoria and Haliburton Regiment.
- Amalgamated on 14 December 1936 with the 45th Field Battery, RCA and redesignated as the 45th Field Battery (Howitzer), RCA.

=== 4th Field Regiment (Self-propelled), RCA ===
- Originated on 9 May 1905 in Cobourg, Ontario, as the 10th Brigade of Field Artillery, CA.
- Redesignated on 2 February 1920 as the 4th Brigade, CFA.
- Redesignated on 1 July 1925 as the 4th Field Brigade, CA.
- Redesignated on 3 June 1935 as the 4th Field Brigade, RCA.
- Redesignated on 7 November 1940 as the 4th (Reserve) Field Brigade, RCA.
- Redesignated on 24 June 1942 as the 43rd (Reserve) Field Regiment, RCA.
- Redesignated on 1 April 1946 as the 4th Field Regiment, RCA.
- Redesignated on 19 June 1947 as the 4th Field Regiment (Self- propelled), RCA.
- Amalgamated on 1 September 1954 as the 45th Field Battery (Self-propelled), RCA and the 56th Field Battery (Self-propelled), RCA.

=== 56th Field Battery (Self-propelled), RCA ===
- Originated on 1 April 1912 in Goderich, Ontario, as the 31st Battery, CFA.
- Redesignated on 2 February 1920 as the 56th Battery, CFA.
- Redesignated on 1 July 1925 as the 56th Field Battery, CA.
- Redesignated on 3 June 1935 as the 56th Field Battery, RCA.
- Amalgamated on 15 December 1936 with The Grenville Regiment (Lisgar Rifles), and redesignated as the 56th (Grenville) Field Battery, (Howitzer), RCA.
- Redesignated on 1 December 1937 as the 56th (Grenville) Field Battery, RCA.
- Redesignated on 7 November 1940 as the 56th Reserve (Grenville) Field Battery, RCA.
- Redesignated on 1 April 1946 as the 56th Field Battery, RCA.
- Redesignated on 19 June 1947 as the 56th Field Battery (Self-propelled), RCA.
- Amalgamated on 1 September 1954, with the 4th Field Regiment (Self- propelled), RCA, the 45th Field Battery (Self- propelled), RCA, and the 4th Field Battery (Self-propelled), RCA, and redesignated the 45th Medium Battery, RCA.

=== The Grenville Regiment (Lisgar Rifles) ===
- Originated on 12 April 1867 in Prescott, Ontario, as the 56th Prescott Battalion of Infantry.
- Redesignated on 9 August 1867 as the 56th Grenville Battalion of Infantry.
- Redesignated on 13 September 1871 as the 56th Grenville Battalion of Rifles.
- Redesignated on 29 September 1871 as the 56th Grenville Battalion “Lisgar Rifles”.
- Redesignated on 8 May 1900 as the 56th Grenville Regiment "Lisgar Rifles".
- Redesignated on 12 March 1920 as The Grenville Regiment (Lisgar Rifles).
- Amalgamated on 15 December 1936 with the 56th Field Battery, RCA, and redesignated as the 56th (Grenville) Field Battery, (Howitzer), RCA.

=== 4th Field Battery (Self-propelled), RCA ===
- Originated on 9 May 1905 in Peterborough, Ontario, as the 24th Field Battery, CA.
- Redesignated on 2 February 1920 as the 4th Battery, CFA.
- Redesignated on 1 July 1925, as the 4th Field Battery, CA.
- Redesignated on 3 June 1935 as the 4th Field Battery, RCA.
- Redesignated on 7 November 1940 as the 4th (Reserve) Field Battery, RCA.
- Redesignated on 1 September 1943 as the 4th (Reserve) Anti-Aircraft Battery (Type 2H), RCA.
- Redesignated on 1 April 1946 as the 4th Field Battery, RCA.
- Redesignated on 19 June 1947 as the 4th Field Battery (Self- propelled), RCA.
- Amalgamated on 1 September 1954 with the 4th Field Regiment (Self-propelled), RCA, the 45th Field Battery (Self-propelled), RCA, and the 56th Field Battery (Self-propelled), RCA, and redesignated the 45th Medium Battery, RCA.

=== Lineage chart ===
Lineage chart 1856–1914

1856	Independent cavy troops	Independent infy and rifle coys
1857	Independent infy and rifle coys
1862	Independent infy and rifle coys
1866	45th "West Durham" Bn of Infy
1867	57th Peterborough Bn of Infy	56th "Prescott" Bn of Infy
1867	56th "Grenville" Bn of Infy
1871	56th Grenville Bn of Rifles
1871	56th Grenville Bn "Lisgar Rifles"
1872	14th Fd Bty, CA
1875	3rd Provisional Regt of Cavy
1880	57th Bn of Infy "Peterborough Rangers"
1881	3rd Provisional Regt of Cavy, The Prince of Wales' Canadian Dragoons
1892	3rd Regt of Cavy, The Prince of Wales' Canadian Dragoons
1893	3rd The Prince of Wales' Canadian Dragoons
1898	45th "Victoria" Bn of Infy
1900	57th Regt "Peterborough Rangers"	45th Victoria Regt	56th Grenville Regt "Lisgar Rifles"
1905	10th Bde of Fd Arty, CA

Lineage chart 1914–1936

57th Regt "Peterborough Rangers"	3rd The Prince of Wales' Canadian Dragoons	45th Victoria Regt
1914	2nd Bn, CEF
1915	93rd "Overseas" Bn, CEF	109th "Overseas" Bn', CEF
1916	Absorbed by 39th Reserve Bn	Absorbed by 20th, 21st, 38th and 124th "Overseas" Bn
1917	247th "Overseas" Infy Bn,CEF	45th Victoria and Haliburton Regt	252nd "Overseas" Infy Bn, CEF
1917	Absorbed by 235th "Overseas" Bn	Disbanded
1918	4th Bn, CMGC, CEF
1919	4th MG Bde, CMGC
1920	Disbanded	Disbanded
1920	1st Bn (2nd Bn, CEF), The Peterborough Rangers	2nd Bn (93rd Bn, CEF), (Note: Reserve order of battle) The Peterborough Rangers	3rd Bn (247th Bn, CEF), The Peterborough Rangers	1st Bn (109th Bn, CEF), The Victoria and Haliburton Regt	2nd Bn (252nd Bn, CEF), The Victoria and Haliburton Regt
1924	4th MG Bn, CMGC
1925
1935
1936	Disbanded	Disbanded	Disbanded
1936	The Prince of Wales Rangers (Peterborough Regt) (MG)	45th Fd Bty (Howitzer), RCA

10th Bde of Fd Arty, CA	56th Grenville Regt "Lisgar Rifles"
4th Fd Arty Bde, CFA, CEF
Disbanded
4th Bde, CFA	1st Bn, The Grenville Regt (Lisgar Rifles)	2nd Bn, The Grenville Regt (Lisgar Rifles)
4th Fd Bde, CA
4th Fd Bde, RCA
Disbanded
56th (Grenville) Fd Bty (Howitzer), RCA

Lineage chart 1936–present

The Prince of Wales Rangers (Peterborough Regt) (MG)	45th Fd Bty (Howitzer), RCA	4th Fd Bde, RCA	56th (Grenville) Fd Bty (Howitzer), RCA
1937	56th (Grenville) Fd Bty, RCA
1940	45th (Reserve) Fd Bty (Howitzer), RCA	4th (Reserve) Fd Bde, RCA	56th Reserve (Grenville) Fd Bty, RCA
1942	1st Bn, The Prince of Wales Rangers (Peterborough Regt), CASF	2nd (Reserve) Bn, The Prince of Wales Rangers (Peterborough Regt)	45th/56th (Reserve) Fd Bty, RCA	43rd (Reserve) Fd Regt, RCA
1945	Disbanded	The Prince of Wales Rangers (Peterborough Regt)
1946	50th Heavy Anti-Aircraft Regt (The Prince of Wales Rangers), RCA	45th Fd Bty, RCA	4th Fd Regt, RCA	56th Fd Bty, RCA
1947	45th Fd Bty (Self-propelled), RCA	4th Fd Regt (Self-propelled), RCA	56th Fd Bty (Self-propelled), RCA
1954	45th Medium Bty, RCA
1955	50th Medium Anti-Aircraft Regt (The Prince of Wales Rangers), RCA
1960	50th Medium Anti-Aircraft Arty Regt (The Prince of Wales Rangers), RCA
1960	50th Fd Arty Regt (The Prince of Wales Rangers), RCA
1970	Supplementary Order of Battle

== Notable members ==
- Sir Sam Hughes - joined the 45th West Durham Battalion of Infantry
