= Joseph Ballard Atherton =

American Hawaii businessman (1837–1903)

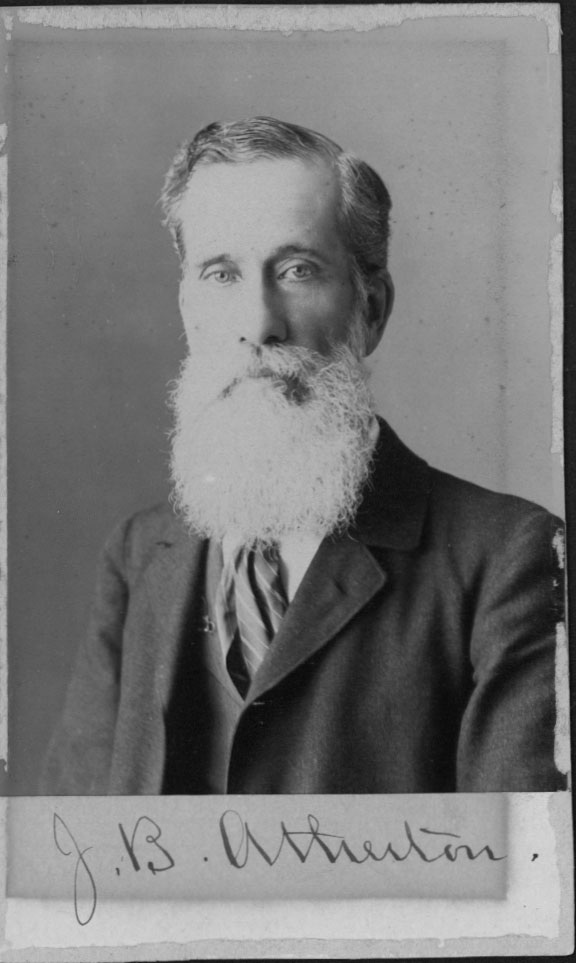
- Joseph Ballard Atherton
- Born: November 9, 1837; Boston, Suffolk, Massachusetts
- Died: April 7, 1903 (aged 65); Honolulu, Territory of Hawaii, USA
- Occupations: businessman, philanthropist
- Spouse: Juliette Montague Cooke

Joseph Ballard Atherton (1837–1903) was a Honolulu businessman and a former president of Castle & Cooke. He was an early founder of Honolulu YMCA and in later life served as its president. He was a member of the Annexation group, which overthrew the Kingdom of Hawaii. Atherton was a member of both Kalākaua's Privy Council of State and Liliʻuokalani's Privy Council of State.

== Early years ==
Born in 1837 in Boston, Massachusetts. He was the son of Jonathan Atherton and Elizabeth Robinson. His early education was received at public schools, graduating from the Brimmer School and the Boston Latin School.

In December 1858 he sailed to Honolulu, Hawaii, on a long ocean voyage via Cape Horn on the clipper ship Syren, seeking to improve his health.

== Career ==
Shortly after his arrival in Honolulu (with letters of introduction to Samuel Northrup Castle and others), he took a job as a bookkeeper at Castle & Cooke, a sugar cane producer. In 1865, he was named a junior partner, and in 1894 he became senior member; and then its president.

During his lifetime Atherton became one of the most wealthiest and influential businessmen on the Hawaiian Islands, primarily interested in sugar cane, he later became active in a number of corporations and enterprises.

Castle & Cooke during his tenure, was one of the Big Five (Hawaii), known in Hawaiian as Nā Hui Nui ʻElima. These sugarcane processing corporations wielded considerable political power in the Territory of Hawaii and leaned heavily towards the Hawaii Republican Party. He remained as president of Castle & Cooke until his death in 1903.

He was President of the Hawaiian Sugar Planters' Association, as well as for many years being the President of the Honolulu Chamber of Commerce (1896–1899). He was a leading and influential member of the Fort Street Church, Honolulu, later the Central Union Church, where he was deacon and treasurer. Civic duties included being appointed as a member of the privy council under King Kalakaua in 1887, and again in 1891 by his successor, Queen Liliuokalani.

== Overthrow of the Hawaiian monarchy ==
Atherton was a member of the Committee of Safety (Hawaii), formally the Citizen's Committee of Public Safety. The Committee was composed of mostly Hawaiian subjects and American citizens who were members of the Missionary Party, as well as foreign residents in the Kingdom of Hawaiʻi that planned and carried out the overthrow of the Kingdom of Hawaiʻi on January 17, 1893. The new independent Republic of Hawaii government was thwarted in this goal by the administration of President Grover Cleveland, and it was not until 1898 that the United States Congress approved a joint resolution of annexation creating the Territory of Hawaii. In 1901 he traveled to Washington, D.C., to meet President Theodore Roosevelt, as part of a committee including Francis Mills Swanzy (managing director of Theo H. Davies & Co.), and William Owen Smith to discuss the needs of Hawaii; specifically use of Chinese labor and the arrival of automobiles.

== Other business interests ==
In 1897 Atherton, along with Peter Cushman Jones (Minister of Finance under Liliuokalani) and his son Edwin A. Jones, Clarence Hyde Cooke, Fred W. MacFarlane, Edward Davies Tinney, H. Waterhouse, T. May and C. Bosse founded the Bank of Hawaii, the second bank to be established in the Hawaiian Islands. The Bank of Hawaii was chartered in the Republic of Hawaii by Interior Minister James A. King. A decade after its founding in 1903, the bank opened its first branch in Kauai.

He served as a director or trustee for many prominent organizations and boards in Hawaii, including the Oahu Railway and Land Company, Honolulu Iron Works, Paia Plantation Company, Haiku Sugar Company, Kohala Sugar Company and the Mutual Telephone Company. He was a director of various other business enterprises throughout the Hawaiian Islands.

A supporter of the annexation of Hawaii by the United States, he founded the newspaper Hawaiian Star of Honolulu in 1893, as, "the official voice of the Provisional Government by American businessman." Hawaii was annexed April 30, 1900, becoming the Territory of Hawaii. Nine years after Atherton's death, the paper was merged with the Evening Bulletin to become the Honolulu Star-Bulletin, financially backed by the Atherton family.

== Personal life ==
After five years on the islands, he became engaged to Juliette Montague Cooke (1843–1921), the daughter of Amos Starr Cooke, She shared the same name as her mother Juliette Montague Cooke.

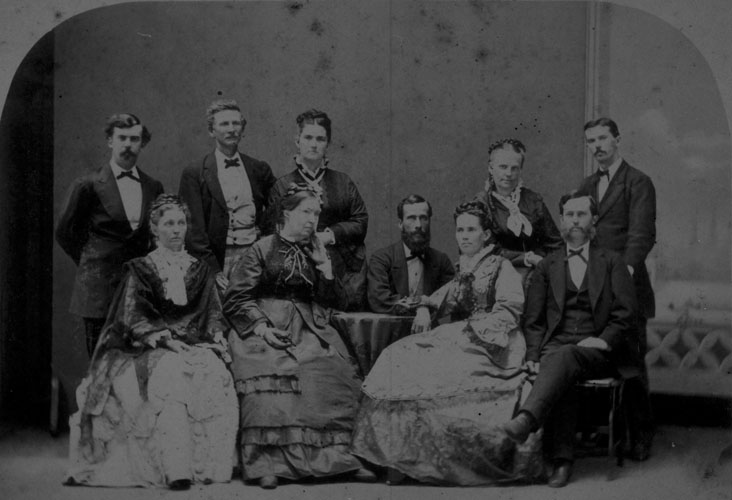
Atherton (sat at center) with the Cooke family, about 1874, N-0676, Mission Houses Museum Archives

Shortly afterwards Juliette left for the United States on a year long visit. Upon her return they married on June 29, 1865. The couple had six children, two of whom died at an early age:

- Charles H. Atherton

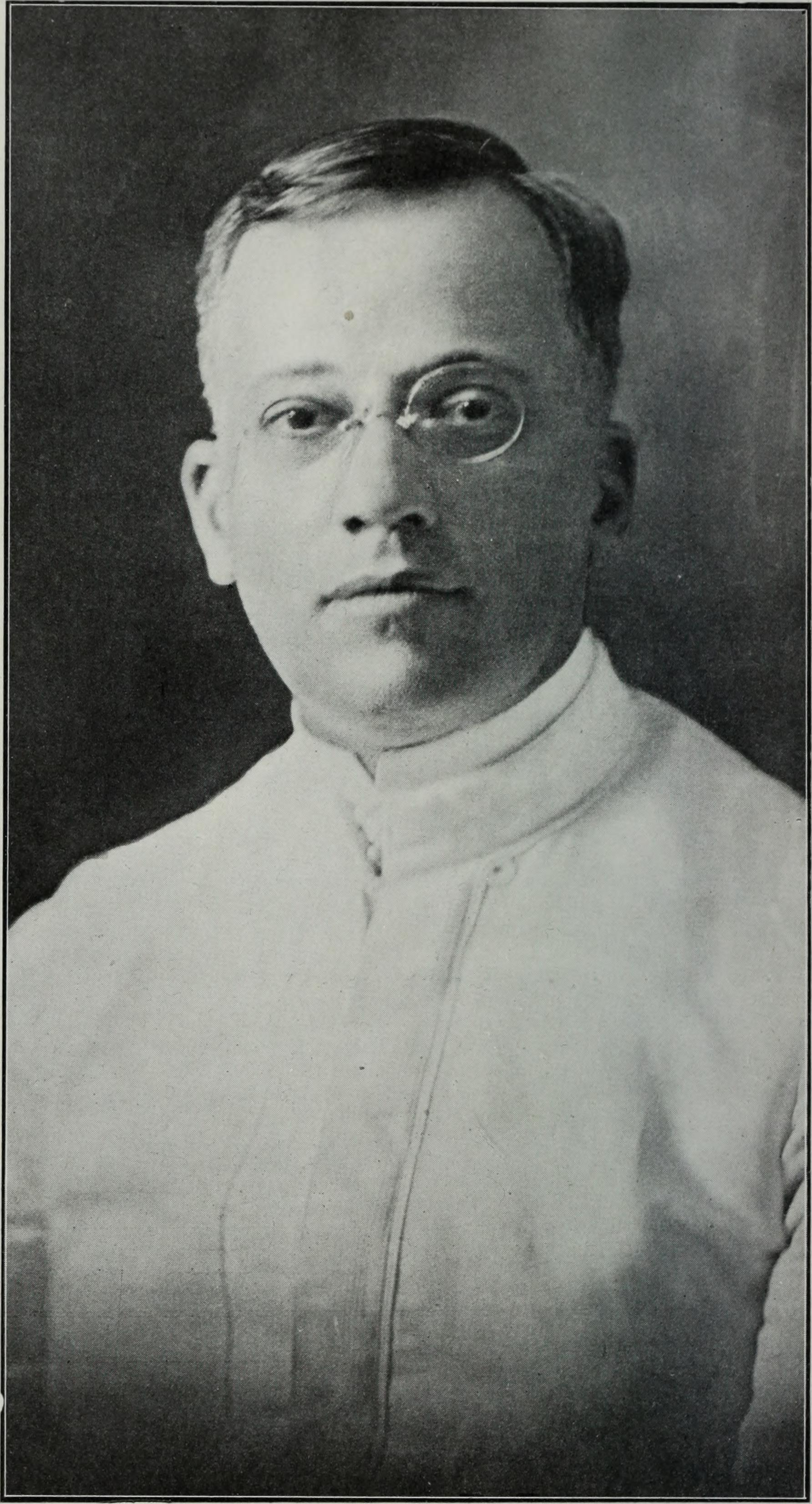
Charles H. Atherton (1867–1878) who later assumed the full business responsibilities of his father

- Mary Atherton (1869–1951) who married Theodore Richards and who wrote about her grandmother Juliette Montague Cooke.
- Benjamin Hawley Atherton (1871–1878), who died at an early age.
- Dr Alexander Montague Atherton (1875–1903) who went on to work at his alma mater, Johns Hopkins University. Doctor of Medicine. A.R., Wesleyan 1897, Resident Physician Charity Hospital, Blackwell’s Island, NY 1901–1902, and then as a Physician in Honolulu.
- Frank Cooke Atherton

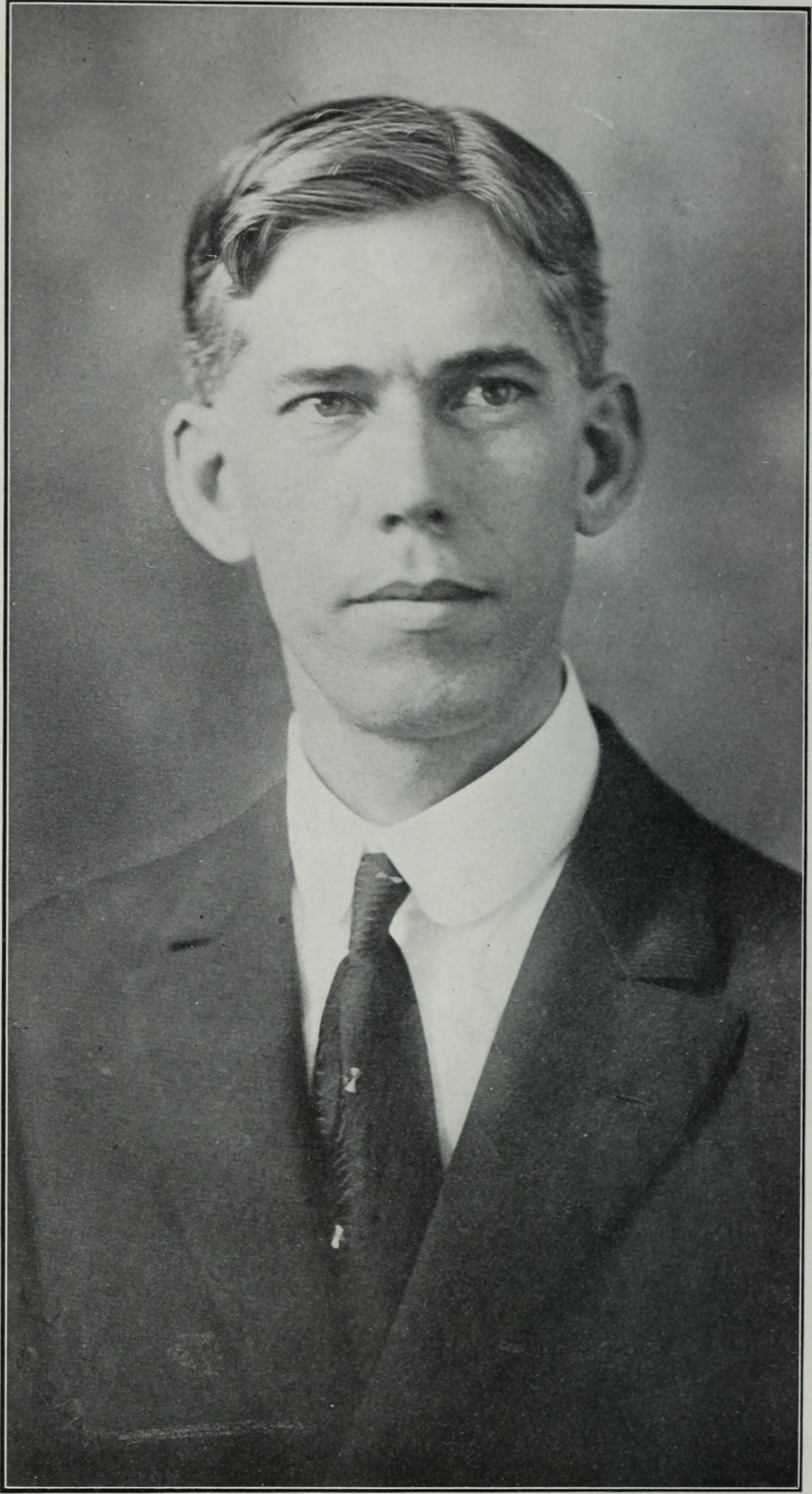
Frank Cooke Atherton (1877–1945) began his career at the Bank of Hawaii, and was later, Director of Hawaiian Electric Co. His son, J. Ballard Atherton, was president of the Hawaiian Telephone Company.

- Kate Marion Atherton (1879–1919)

== Death ==
He died in Honolulu on April 7, 1903, and was buried at Kawaiahaʻo Church Cemetery, Honolulu. His death, reportedly after suffering from a long lingering illness was reported on the front cover of The Honolulu Advertiser, of April 8, 1903, and a full obituary was featured on page 7, of the same newspaper. Such was his prominence in the city of Honolulu, that there was a universal closing of business establishments, as a mark of respect to him. He was survived by many grandchildren.

== Legacy ==
Atherton helped establish the Young Men’s Christian Association in Honolulu, HI and for many years served as one of its directors, and then as its president.

He was an honored member of the Hawaiian Board of Missions, several times being its president. For many years he was a Member if the Board of Trustees of Oahu College. Up to the time of death he was a member of the Board of Trustees of Kawaiahaʻo Female Seminary which was founded in 1864. His last will and testament included a number of charitable bequests

== Bibliography ==
- Bonura, Sandra E.; Day, Deborah (2012). An American Girl in the Hawaiian Islands: Letters of Carrie Prudence Winter, 1890–1893. University of Hawaii Press. ISBN 978-0-8248-3627-6.
- Chapin, Helen Geracimos (1996). Shaping History: The Role of Newspapers in Hawaii. University of Hawai'i Press. ISBN 978-0-8248-6427-9 – via ProjectMuse.
- Hawaiian Mission Children's Society (1912). Annual Report of the Hawaiian Mission Children's Society. Government Press.
- Kuykendall, Ralph Simpson (1967). The Hawaiian Kingdom 1874–1893, The Kalakaua Dynasty. Vol. 3. Honolulu: University of Hawaii Press. ISBN 978-0-87022-433-1. OCLC 500374815.
- Rayson, Ann (2004). Modern History of Hawai'i. Bess Press. ISBN 978-1-57306-209-1.
