= 2nd Battalion (Eastern Ontario Regiment), CEF =

2nd (Eastern Ontario Regiment) Battalion, CEF
- The distinguishing patch of the 2nd Battalion (Eastern Ontario Regiment), CEF.
- Active: 1914-1919
- Country: Canada
- Branch: Canadian Expeditionary Force
- Type: Infantry
- Size: Battalion
- Part of: 1st Canadian Brigade, 1st Canadian Division
- Engagements: First World War
- Battle honours: Ypres and along the Western Front.

The 2nd Battalion (Eastern Ontario Regiment), Canadian Expeditionary Force was an infantry battalion of the Canadian Army created in response to outbreak of the First World War in August 1914. The battalion comprised local militia from many regions of Ontario (and even from Quebec City). Men came from as far away as Sault Ste. Marie to join in Canada's military endeavour. Local militia gathered at Valcartier, in August 1914 and became part of the 2nd Battalion.

== Recruitment ==
The original officers were drawn from the various regiments that recruited for the battalion, including the Governor General's Foot Guards of Ottawa, the 16th Prince Edward Regiment, the 40th Northumberland Regiment, the 41st Brockville Rifles, and the 42nd Lanark and Renfrew Regiment, among others.

The battalion boarded the S.S. Cassandra from Quebec City on 22 September 1914, but sailed only as far as the Gaspé Basin, where more troops were collected. The battalion finally left the Gaspé Basin on 3 October as part of a convoy of at least 30 other ships, carrying a combined 32,000 Canadian soldiers, which would be the first of the Canadian infantry contributions to the war.

The Cassandra landed at Plymouth on 25 October, where the battalion disembarked and began rigorous training for the European battlefield.

== World War I ==
On 8 February 1915, the battalion was mobilized for war. They sailed out of England aboard the S.S. Blackwell, bound for France. The battalion's first taste of battle came later that month, on 19 February, when they entered the trench system at Armentières.

Their first battle was the Second Battle of Ypres, in April 1915. When the battalion pulled out of the battle, on 29 April, the final count included 6 officers and 68 other ranks killed, 4 officers and 158 other ranks wounded, and 5 officers and 302 other ranks missing, for a combined loss of 543 men.

The 2nd Battalion also fought at the battles of Ypres, St. Julien, Festubert, Pozières, Vimy (1917), Arleux, Hill 70, Passchendaele, Amiens, and Canal du Nord, to name only a few. By the end of the war, 242 officers and 5,084 other ranks had fought with the battalion. Of those, 52 officers and 1,227 other ranks were killed in action, accidentally killed, or died of their injuries.

=== Demobilization ===
At 8:30 on the morning of 24 April 1919, the 2nd Battalion was officially demobilized at Kingston, Ontario.

The Colours of the 2nd Battalion, consisting of the King's Colour (presented by His Majesty King George V) and the Regimental Colour (presented by Mr. Charles Band), were kept by the congregation of St. Paul's Church in Bowmanville, Ontario, from 1921 to 1942. In 1942, it was decided the Colours should be moved due to decay, and were entrusted to Dr. Gustave Lanctot, Dominion Archivist. When the Military Museum was completed, the Colours held a place of honour for all to see, never again to be moved.

The 2nd Battalion is perpetuated by the Governor General's Foot Guards and the 50th Field Artillery Regiment (The Prince of Wales Rangers), RCA, currently on the Supplementary Order of Battle.

== Battle honours ==
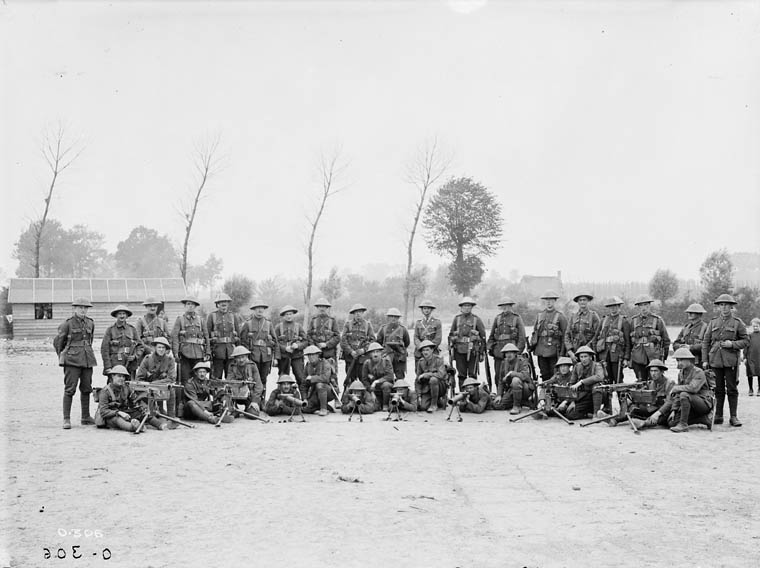
Machine Gun Section, 2nd Battalion of the Canadian Expeditionary Force, at Scottish Lines near Poperinghe, not far from Ypres, after fighting at Sanctuary Wood and Maple Copse, July 16, 1916

The battalion was awarded 25 battle honours (those listed with multiple years separated by commas count as two honours each).

- Ypres: 1915, 1917
- Gravenstafel Ridge
- St. Julien
- Festubert: 1915
- Mont Sorrel
- Somme: 1916
- Pozieres
- Flers-Courcelette
- Ancre Heights
- Arras: 1917, 1918
- Vimy: 1917
- Arleux
- Scarpe: 1917, 1918
- Hill 70
- Passchendaele
- Amiens
- Drocourt-Quéant
- Hindenburg Line
- Canal du Nord
- Pursuit to Mons
- France and Flanders: 1915–18

== See also ==
- List of infantry battalions in the Canadian Expeditionary Force
