= 247th Battalion (Victoria & Haliburton), CEF =

The 247th Battalion, CEF was a unit in the Canadian Expeditionary Force during the First World War. Based in Peterborough, Ontario, the unit began recruiting in the late summer of 1916 in the townships of Peterborough, West Hastings, and Gavan. The unit was absorbed into the 235th Battalion, CEF while still in Canada. The 247th Battalion, CEF, had one Officer Commanding: Lieut-Col. C. H. Ackerman.
