= 93rd Battalion (Peterborough), CEF =

- Cap badge of the 93rd Battalion
- Active: 22 December 1915 - 21 May 1917
- Country: Canada
- Branch: Canadian Army
- Type: Infantry
- Size: Battalion
- Part of: Canadian Expeditionary Force
- Garrison/HQ: Peterborough, Ontario
- Engagements: World War I

Commanders
- Notable commanders: Lt.-Col. T.J. Johnston

The 93rd Battalion (Peterborough), CEF, was an infantry battalion of the Great War Canadian Expeditionary Force. The 93rd Battalion was authorized on 22 December 1915 and embarked for Britain on 15 July 1916 where the battalion provided reinforcements to the Canadian Corps in the field until 6 October 1916, when its personnel were absorbed by the 39th Battalion, CEF. The battalion disbanded on 21 May 1917.

The 93rd Battalion recruited in Peterborough County and was mobilized at Peterborough, Ontario.

The 93rd Battalion was commanded by Lt.-Col. T.J. Johnston from 19 September 1916 to 6 October 1916.

The 93rd Battalion was awarded the battle honour THE GREAT WAR 1916.

The 93rd Battalion (Peterborough), CEF, is perpetuated by 50th Field Artillery Regiment (The Prince of Wales Rangers), RCA.

== Sources ==
Canadian Expeditionary Force 1914–1919 by Col. G. W. L. Nicholson, CD, Queen's Printer, Ottawa, Ontario, 1962
