= Emma Nāwahī =

Native Hawaiian political activist

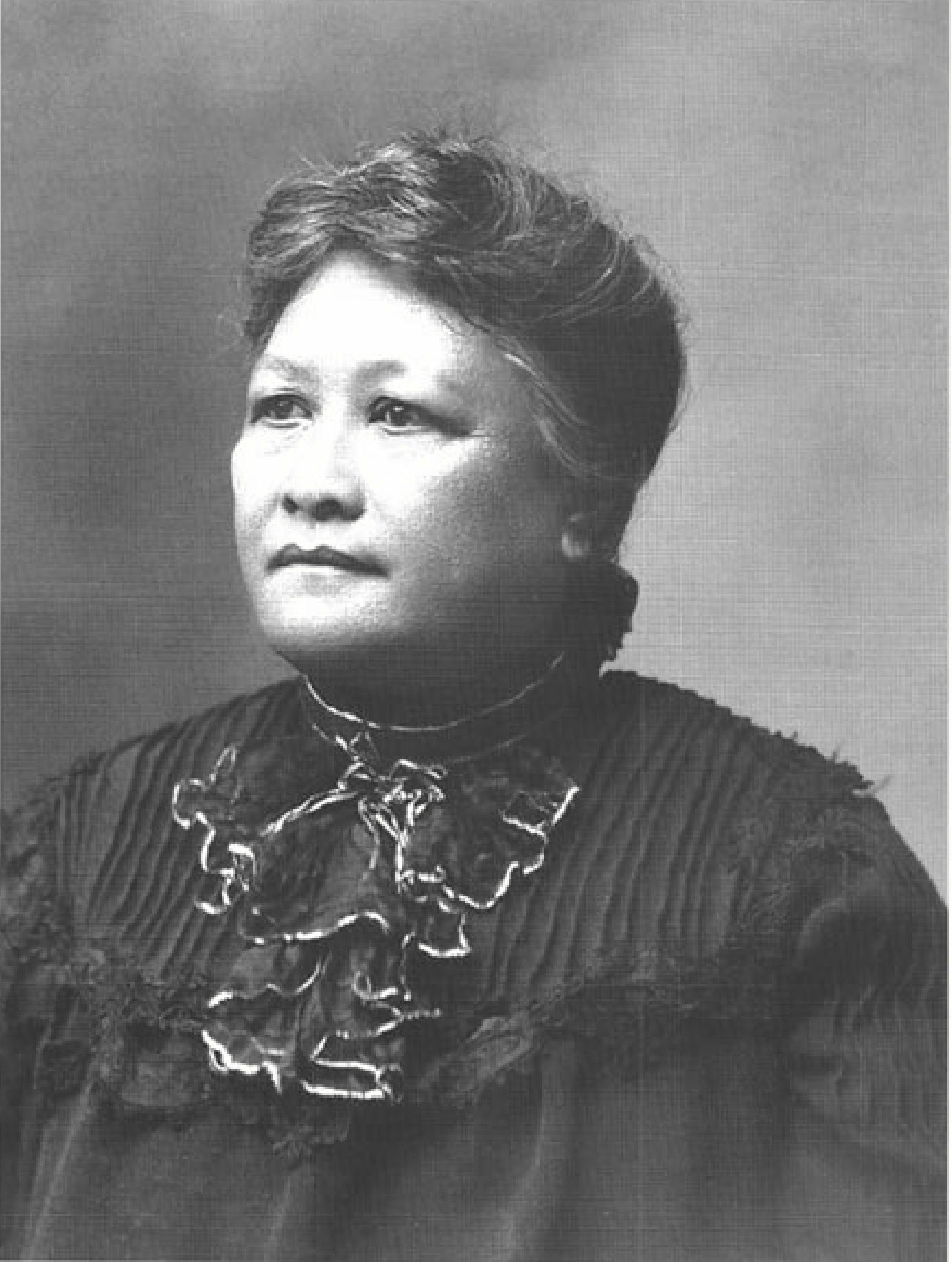
- Emma Nāwahī
- Born: Emma ʻAʻima Aʻii; September 22, 1868; Kūkūau, Hilo, Hawaii
- Died: December 28, 1935 (aged 81); Hilo, Hawaii
- Occupation: Newspaper publisher
- Spouse: Joseph Nāwahī
- Children: 3
- Parent(s): Tong Yee Aʻii; Kahaoleʻauʻa

Emma ʻAʻima Aʻii Nāwahī (September 28, 1854 – December 28, 1935) was a Native Hawaiian political activist, community leader and newspaper publisher. She and her husband Joseph Nāwahī were leaders in the opposition to the overthrow of the Kingdom of Hawaiʻi and they co-founded Ke Aloha Aina, a Hawaiian language newspaper, which served as an important voice in the resistance to the annexation of Hawaiʻi to the United States. After annexation, she helped establish the Democratic Party of Hawaiʻi and became a supporter of the women's suffrage movement.

== Early life ==
Born on September 28, 1854, at Kūkūau, a rural part of Hilo on the island of Hawaiʻi, she was regarded as a hapa-pākē, of half-Native Hawaiian and half-Chinese descent. Her mother Kahaoleʻauʻa was the daughter of a minor Hilo chief, while her father Tong Yee was a Chinese immigrant from Xiangshan County, Guangdong. Her father originally left China to take part in the California Gold Rush but later settled in Hilo in 1850 where he became a successful businessman and co-founded Paukaʻa Sugar Plantation with other Chinese sugar planters from lands leased from King Kamehameha V. Her parents married on June 25, 1851. Her father adopted the surname Aʻii (based on the Hawaiian pronunciation of his given name) for himself and his children. She and her four sisters: Aʻana, Aʻlai, Aʻoe, and Mihana were known as Ka Pua O Kina (The Flower of China) and regarded as "famous beauties."

On February 17, 1881, Emma married politician Joseph Nāwahī, in Hilo, as his second wife. They had three sons: Albert Kahiwahiwa Nāwahī (1881–1904), Alexander Kaʻeʻeokalani Nāwahī (1883–1942) and Joseph Nāwahī, Jr. (1885–1888). Through their sons, they have surviving descendants living to this day. They also adopted a daughter named Emmeline Kaleionamoku "Kalei" Nāwahī (1877–1901), who died while attending St. Andrew's Priory School in Honolulu. During her husband's political career and the couple's residency in Honolulu, Emma became a lady-in-waiting and confidante to Queen Liliʻuokalani.

== Political activism ==
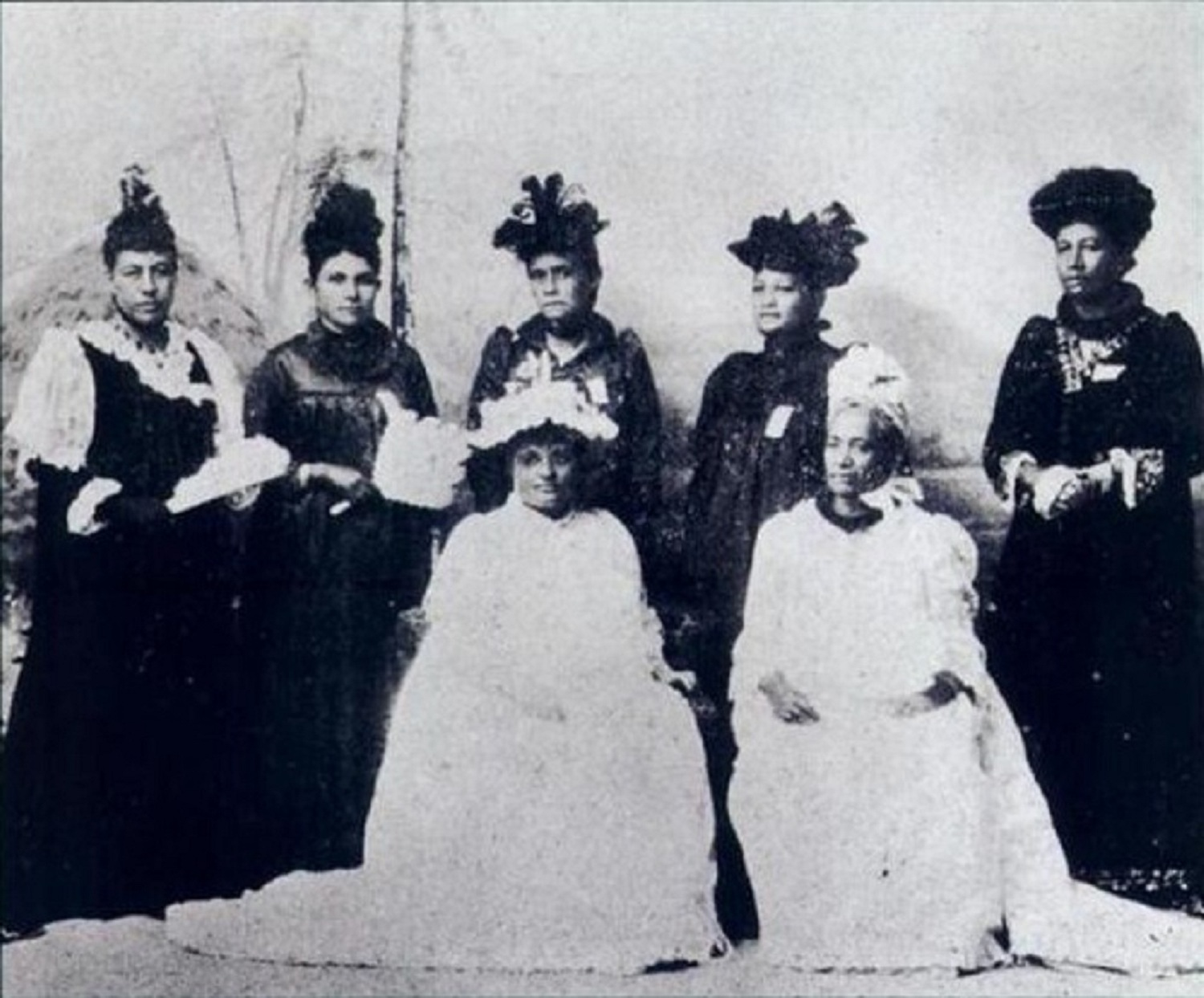
The Hui Aloha ʻĀina o Na Wahine, 1893

Following the overthrow of the monarchy, on January 17, 1893, her husband Joseph Nāwahī became the president of Hui Aloha ʻĀina o Na Kane (Hawaiian Patriotic League for Men), a patriotic group founded shortly after the overthrow to oppose annexation and support the deposed queen. Emma joined the corresponding female organization, the Hui Aloha ʻĀina o Na Wahine (Hawaiian Women's Patriotic League), which was under the leadership of Abigail Kuaihelani Campbell as president. She served as one of the member of the executive committee of the organization in 1893 and later served as the Secretary of the Hilo Branch of the League.

In 1893, Emma and the other members of the executive committee of Hui Aloha ʻĀina o Na Wahine submitted a petition to the United States Commissioner James Henderson Blount sent by President Grover Cleveland to investigate the overthrow. The petitions addressed to the government of the United States read:

We, the women of the Hawaiian Islands, for our families and the happiness of our homes, desire peace and political quiet, and we pray that man's greed for power and spoils shall not be allowed to disturb the otherwise happy life of these islands, and that the revolutionary agitations and disturbances inaugurated here since 1887, by a few foreigners may be forever suppressed.

To that effect we believe that, in the light of recent events, the peace, welfare, and honor of both America and Hawaii will be better served, for the present, if the Government of the great American Republic does not countenance the illegal conduct and interference of its representatives here and the rash wish of a minority of foreigners for annexation.
Therefore, we respectfully but earnestly pray that Hawaii may be granted the preservation of its independent autonomy and the restoration of its legitimate native monarchy under our Queen Liliuokalani, in whom we have full confidence.

And we hope that the distinguished citizen, who so wisely presides over the United States, may kindly receive this our petition, for which we shall evermore pray for God's blessing on him and his Government.

In December 1894, a search warrant was served on the Nāwahīs' Kapālama home looking for "sundry arms and ammunition." Although nothing was found, Joseph Nāwahī was arrested for treason and bail was set at 10,000 dollars. He spent nearly three months in jail until being bailed out. In May 1895, Nāwahī and Emma founded Ke Aloha Aina, a weekly anti-annexationist newspaper written in the Hawaiian language to promote Hawaiian independence and opposition to American annexation. The paper ran until 1920.

Following his release, Nāwahī's health deteriorated from the tuberculosis he had contracted during his imprisonment. On the recommendation of his doctor to seek a change of climate, they left Hawaiʻi for a trip to San Francisco, California. They left Honolulu aboard the steamer Alameda on August 20, 1896, along with the families of Edward C. MacFarlane and Hermann A. Widemann, both influential royalists and former cabinet ministers of Liliʻuokalani. On September 14, 1896, Nāwahī died of tuberculosis in San Francisco. According to Silva, his last words were to Emma, apologizing for "taking her so far from the ʻäina and from her family and friends, to deal with his death alone in a foreign place". Emma had the remains of her dead husband embalmed and returned to Hawaiʻi for two grand state funerals organized by his supporters, and burial at their home in Hilo.

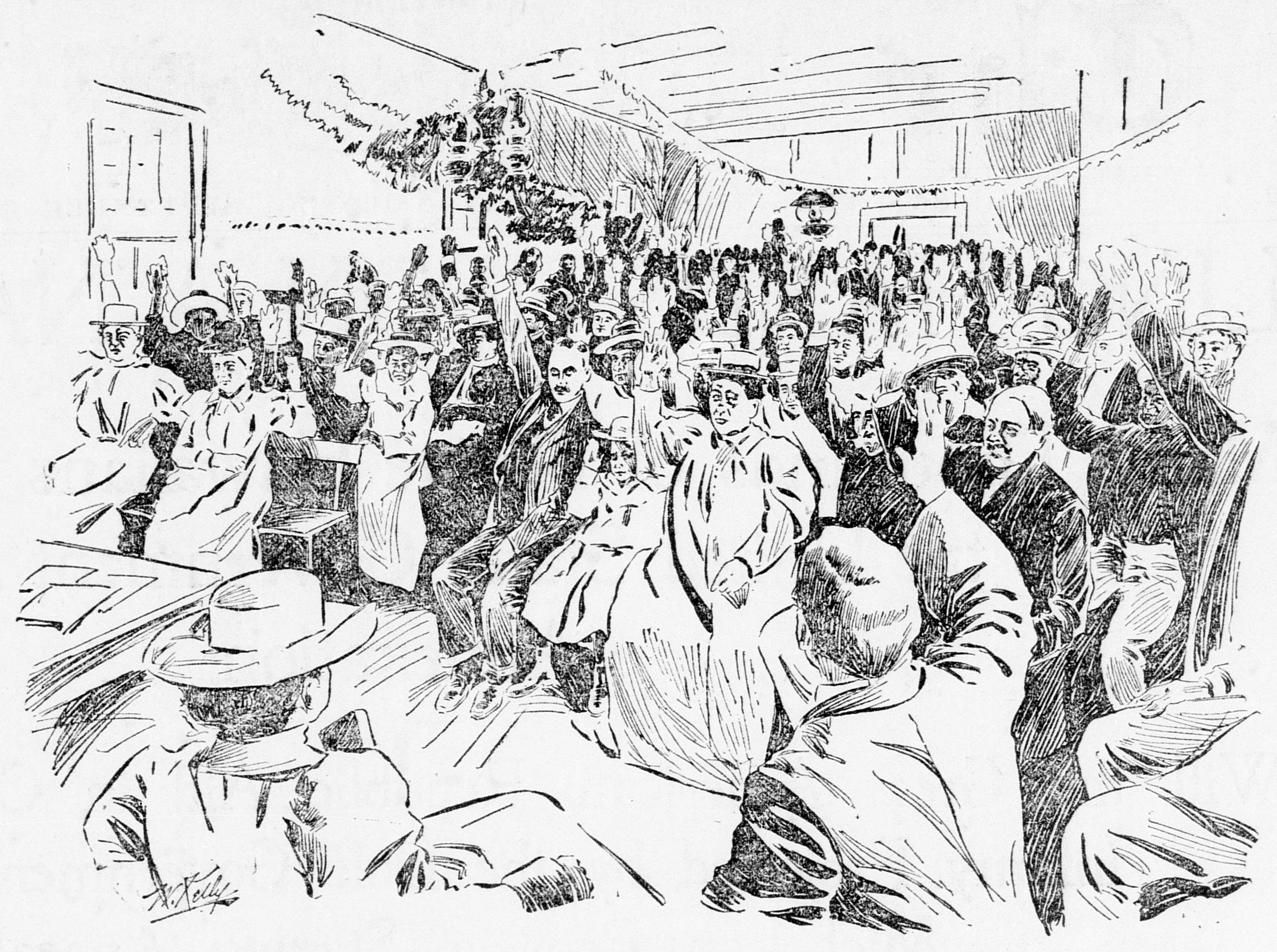
An anti-annexation meeting at Hilo, 1897

After Nāwahī's death, Emma became an important political leader in her own right, continuing the legacy of her husband. In 1897, Emma and members of both the male and female branches of Hui Aloha ʻĀina collected over 21,000 signatures by the residents of the Hawaiian Islands opposing an annexation treaty being discussed on the floors of the United States Senate. These Kūʻē Petitions were submitted by a delegation of Native Hawaiians and was used as evidence of the strong resistance of the Hawaiian community to annexation, and the treaty was defeated in the Senate. After the failure of the treaty, Hawaiʻi was instead annexed by the Newlands Resolution, issued in July 1898, shortly after the outbreak of the Spanish–American War.

After annexation, Emma helped organize the Democratic Party of Hawaiʻi in 1899 at the time of the formation of the Territory of Hawaiʻi. In the 1910s, she became a supporter of the women's suffrage movement prior to the passage of the Nineteenth Amendment to the United States Constitution in 1920.

Emma died on December 28, 1935, and was buried at Homelani Memorial Park and Cemetery in Hilo alongside her husband.

== Bibliography ==
- Bennion, Sherilyn Cox (1990). Equal to the Occasion: Women Editors of the Nineteenth-century West. Reno: University of Nevada Press. ISBN 978-0-87417-163-1. OCLC 21759963.
- Blount, James Henderson (1895). The Executive Documents of the House of Representatives for the Third Session of the Fifty-Third Congress, 1893–'94 in Thirty-Five Volumes. Washington, DC: U.S. Government Printing Office. OCLC 191710879.
- Chapin, Helen G. (2000). Guide to Newspapers of Hawaiʻi: 1834–2000. Honolulu: Hawaiian Historical Society. hdl:10524/1444. OCLC 45330644.
- Char, Tin-Yuke; Char, Wai Jane (1983). Chinese Historic Sites and Pioneer Families of the Island of Hawaii. Honolulu: Published for the Hawaii Chinese History Center by University of Hawaii Press. ISBN 978-0-8248-0863-1. OCLC 255259005.
- Dennis, Yvonne Wakim; Hirschfelder, Arlene; Flynn, Shannon Rothenberger (2016). Native American Almanac: More Than 50,000 Years of the Cultures and Histories of Indigenous Peoples. Canton, MI: Visible Ink Press. ISBN 978-1-57859-607-2. OCLC 946931890.
- Dudoit, D. Mähealani, ed. (1998). ʻÖiwi: A Native Hawaiian Journal. Vol. 1. Honolulu: Kuleana ʻÖiwi Press. ISBN 0-9668220-1-3. OCLC 402770968.
  - Silva, Noenoe K. "Kanaka Maoli Resistance to Annexation". In Dudoit (1998), pp. 40–75.
  - Like, Edward L.; Nawahi, Emma A.; Silva, Noenoe K. "Editorial of Ke Aloha Aina". In Dudoit (1998), pp. 76–105.
- Dudoit, D. Mähealani, ed. (2002). ʻÖiwi: A Native Hawaiian Journal. Vol. 2. Honolulu: Kuleana ʻÖiwi Press. ISBN 0-9668220-2-1. OCLC 402770968.
  - Like, Edward L.; Nawahi, Emma A.; Silva, Noenoe K. "Translations of Articles from the Hawaiian Nationalist Newspaper Ke Aloha Aina". In Dudoit (2002), pp. 118–138.
  - Hoʻomanawanui, Kuʻualoha. "Notable Hawaiians of the 20th Century". In Dudoit (2002), pp. 224–266.
- Haley, James L. (2014). Captive Paradise: A History of Hawaii. New York: St. Martin's Press. ISBN 978-0-312-60065-5. OCLC 865158092.
- Higashi, Kuʻulei; Wilson, William H. (1999). Iosepa Kahoʻoluhi Nāwahīokalaniʻōpuʻu. Hilo: ʻAha Pūnana Leo. ISBN 978-1-58191-081-0. OCLC 54793365.
- Kai, Peggy (1974). "Chinese Settlers in the Village of Hilo Before 1852". The Hawaiian Journal of History. 8. Honolulu: Hawaiian Historical Society: 39–75. hdl:10524/221. OCLC 60626541.
- Kauanui, J. Kēhaulani (2008). Hawaiian Blood: Colonialism and the Politics of Sovereignty and Indigeneity. Durham, NC: Duke University Press. ISBN 978-0-8223-9149-4. OCLC 308649636.
- McKinzie, Edith Kawelohea (1986). Stagner, Ishmael W. (ed.). Hawaiian Genealogies: Extracted from Hawaiian Language Newspapers. Vol. 2. Honolulu: University of Hawaii Press. ISBN 978-0-939154-37-1. OCLC 12555087.
- Mehmed, Ali (1998). "Hoʻohuiʻaina Pala Ka Maiʻa: Remembering Annexation One Hundred Years Ago". The Hawaiian Journal of History. 32. Honolulu: Hawaiian Historical Society: 141–154. hdl:10524/358. OCLC 60626541.
- Proto, Neil Thomas (2009). The Rights of My People: Liliuokalani's Enduring Battle with the United States, 1893–1917. New York: Algora Publishing. ISBN 978-0-87586-720-5. OCLC 319248358.
- Silva, Noenoe K. (2004). Aloha Betrayed: Native Hawaiian Resistance to American Colonialism. Durham: Duke University Press. ISBN 0-8223-8622-4. OCLC 191222123.
- Yasutake, Rumi (2017). "Re-Franchising Women of Hawaiʻi, 1912–1920: Politics of Gender, Sovereignty, Race, and Rank at the Crossroads of the Pacific". In Choy, Catherine Ceniza; Wu, Judy Tzu-Chun (eds.). Gendering the Trans-Pacific World. Leiden: Brill. ISBN 978-90-04-33610-0. OCLC 976394366.
