= Joseph Nāwahī =

Hawaiian-American public figure (1842–1896)

The Honourable Joseph Nāwahī
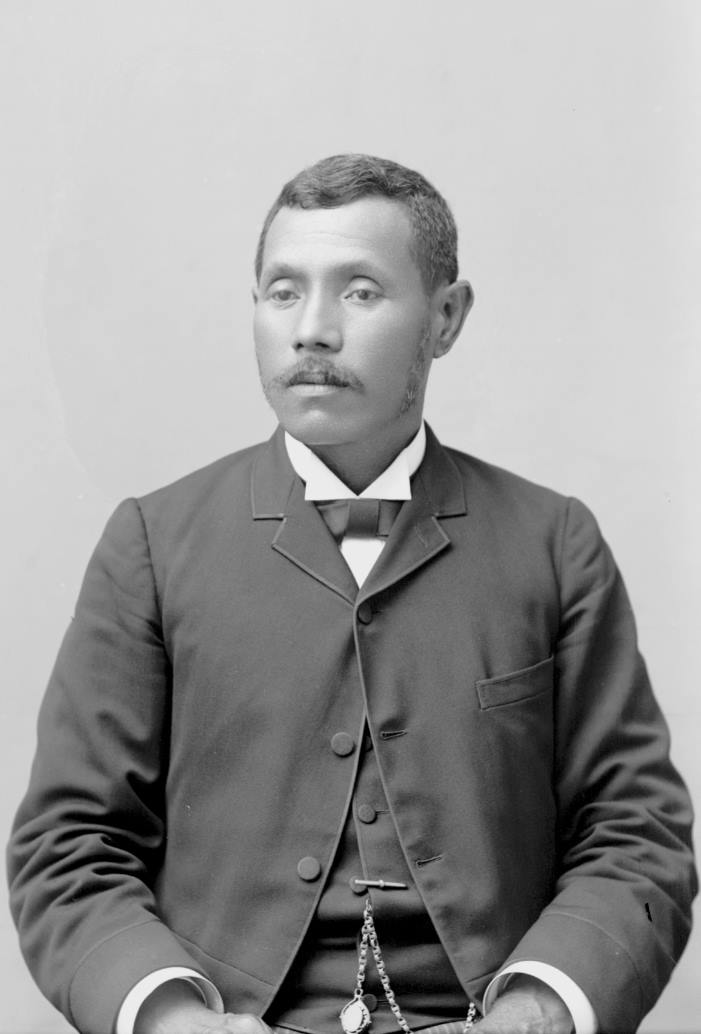

Kingdom of Hawaii Minister of Foreign Affairs
- In office November 1, 1892 – November 8, 1892
- Monarch: Liliʻuokalani
- Preceded by: Samuel Parker
- Succeeded by: Mark P. Robinson

Member of the Kingdom of Hawaii House of Representatives for the district of Puna, Hawaii
- In office 1872–1876

Member of the Kingdom of Hawaii House of Representatives for the district of Hilo, Hawaii
- In office 1878–1884, 1890–1893

Personal details
- Born: January 13, 1842 Kaimū, Puna, Kingdom of Hawaii
- Died: September 14, 1896 (aged 54) San Francisco, California, United States
- Party: Liberal; Kuokoa; Emmaite
- Spouse: Emma ʻAʻima Nāwahī
- Children: 3
- Occupation: Newspaper publisher, lawyer, painter

Joseph Kahoʻoluhi Nāwahī (January 13, 1842 – September 14, 1896), also known by his full Hawaiian name Iosepa Kahoʻoluhi Nāwahīokalaniʻōpuʻu, was a Native Hawaiian nationalist leader, legislator, lawyer, newspaper publisher, and painter. Through his long political service during the monarchy and the important roles he played in the resistance and opposition to its overthrow, Nāwahī is regarded as an influential Hawaiian patriot.

Born on the island of Hawaii, Nāwahī received his formal education in the Protestant missionary schools of the islands. He began his career as a teacher at the Hilo Boarding School and later became a self-taught lawyer. He was also an accomplished artist, and was one of the few indigenous Hawaiian painters to work in Western styles during the 19th century. Entering the realm of politics in 1872 as a member of the House of Representatives, he represented his home districts of Puna and later Hilo in the Legislature of the Kingdom of Hawaii for two decades. Serving in the final legislative assembly 1892–1893, he became a political leader for the Liberal faction in the government. He established himself as a leader in the opposition to the unpopular Bayonet Constitution of 1887 and as a defender of the idea of Hawaiian nationhood and self-rule. Alongside William Pūnohu White, he was a principal author of the proposed 1893 Constitution with Queen Liliʻuokalani. They were decorated Knight Commanders of the Royal Order of Kalākaua for their service and contribution to the monarchy. Three days after an attempted promulgation of the constitution, the queen was deposed during the overthrow of the Kingdom of Hawaii on January 17, 1893.

During the Provisional Government of Hawaii and the Republic of Hawaii that followed it, he remained loyal to the fallen monarchy. He was elected as president of the Hui Aloha ʻĀina (Hawaiian Patriotic League), a patriotic organization established after the overthrow to oppose annexation. He and his wife Emma Nāwahī (a political leader in her own right) established the anti-annexation newspaper Ke Aloha Aina.

In December 1894, Nāwahī was arrested and imprisoned by the Republic on charges of treason. He was acquitted and released, but died, on September 14, 1896, from tuberculosis contracted during his imprisonment. His funeral services in Honolulu and Hilo were attended by supporters and friends; even his former enemies and the government of the Republic acknowledged his important contributions as a Hawaiian patriot.

== Early life and education ==
Joseph (or Iosepa) Kahoʻoluhi Nāwahīokalaniʻōpuʻu was born January 13, 1842, at the village of Kaimū, known as the "land of the patterned sand" in the Puna district, located in the southeastern corner of the island of Hawaii. (Note: His birthplace was poetically referred as "Kaimū of the 'Patterned Sands' in the District of the land where the sun first appears and which is famed for its perfumed bowers of hala and hīnano...and the land in fragrant Puna at the southern boundary of the island of chief Keawe.") His parents were Nāwahīokalaniʻōpuʻu and Keaweolalo (also known as Keaweleikini). Born into a family of the kaukau aliʻi class of chiefs, subordinate to the high chiefs or aliʻi nui, Nawahi's chiefly (aliʻi) descent was rarely emphasized in his lifetime. His father was descended from the chiefly retainers of the 18th century King Kalaniʻōpuʻu, who the British explorer Captain James Cook attempted to kidnap at Kealakekua Bay in 1779, before his demise at the hand of the Hawaiians. Shortly after his birth, he was adopted in the Hawaiian tradition of hānai by his paternal uncle Joseph Paʻakaula, an elementary schoolteacher who became the first educator of his hānai son at the ʻAiakalā School.

In 1853, at the age of eleven, Nāwahī was enrolled in the Hilo Boarding School, a Protestant mission vocational school, under the care and instruction of American missionary Reverend David Belden Lyman. The school had been established in 1835 by Lyman and his wife to teach Native Hawaiian boys the trades needed to adapt to a modernizing Hawaii entering the industrial age. Students were taught the ideals of American Protestant work ethics, and were required to perform manual labor to pay for their board. It became a model for the schools of the rest of the islands and also influenced missionary descendant Samuel C. Armstrong, who founded Hampton University to educate emancipated slaves after the American Civil War. In 1857, Nāwahī attended the Lāhaināluna School on Maui, where he was educated by J. F. Pokue and L. ʻAnalū. Upon graduating from Lahainaluna in 1861, he decided to continue his education at the Chief's School at Kahehuna (also known as the Royal School) for several years under the tutelage of Reverend Edward G. Beckwith.

After finishing his formal education, Nāwahī returned to the island of Hawaii and worked as a teacher, establishing his own boarding school at Piʻihonua in 1863. Principal Lyman later hired him to become assistant principal at his alma mater, Hilo Boarding School. Although educated and heavily influenced by the American missionaries, Nāwahī remained loyal to his Hawaiian roots, as evidenced by his later political opposition to the descendants of the missionaries. According to historian Jon Kamakawiwoʻole Osorio, "he was the living promise of the Calvinist mission and an exemplar of that mission's contradictions. He was a Christian Native who was, nevertheless, a firm and lifelong opponent of annexation." Historian Noenoe K. Silva noted that "Nawahi retained his Kanaka identity while assimilating Christianity into his life and philosophy."

Continuing his intellectual pursuits, Nāwahī became a self-taught lawyer and surveyor, gaining the skills of these professions without formal instruction. By the time he was thirty years old, he had earned the license to practice law in the courts of the kingdom. It was his legal career which would gain him entrance into politics.

== Personal life ==
Nāwahī married twice. On January 17, 1862, he married a Hawaiian woman named Meleana Keakahiwa, who died shortly after their marriage. His obituary in the Hawaiian language newspaper Ka Makaainana claimed this first marriage ended in divorce and his first wife survived him. He married secondly Emma ʻAʻima Aʻii in Hilo on February 17, 1881. She was half-Hawaiian and half-Chinese, being the daughter of a Hilo chiefess and Tong Yee, a Chinese businessman and founder of Paukaʻa Sugar Plantation. In later life, Emma would become an important political leader in her own right. They had three sons including Albert Kahiwahiwa Nāwahī (1881–1904), Alexander Kaʻeʻeokalani Nāwahī (1883–1942) and Joseph Nāwahī, Jr. (1885–1888). Through his sons, he currently has descendants living to this day. They also adopted a daughter named Emmeline Kaleionamoku "Kalei" Nāwahī (1877–1901), who died while attending school at St. Andrew's Priory in Honolulu.

== Political career ==
Nāwahī first entered politics during the last year of the reign of King Kamehameha V. His election as a member of the House of Representatives, the lower house of the Hawaiian legislature, for the district of Puna, was reported on February 14, 1872. During this first term, Kamehameha V died without naming an heir and he and his fellow legislators unanimously elected the popular Lunalilo to the throne. The new king died in 1874 after a short reign, also without naming a successor, causing the legislators to convene and elect a new monarch again. Nāwahī, now in his second term, became one of the six legislators who cast their votes in favor of the defeated Queen Emma of Hawaii. Kalākaua, who won the legislative election, ascended the throne as Hawaii's second elected monarch in the wake of the Honolulu Courthouse riot led by Emma's defeated supporters.

After the controversial 1874 election, Nāwahī became a member of the Queen Emma Party and joined with Representative George Washington Pilipō of North Kona in forming the native opposition against Kalākaua. He was re-elected to every meeting of the biannual legislature during this period as the representative from Puna and later Hilo, starting from 1878. Over the next decade, Nāwahī characterized himself as a leader of the Independent (Kuokoa) faction against the government-backed National Party. He opposed the Reciprocity Treaty of 1875, introduced and personally negotiated by the king, fearing the negative consequences of aligning Hawaii too closely to the United States. Nāwahī blasted the treaty as "he ku ʻikahi kaʻili aupuni" ("a nation-snatching treaty") and prophesied that it "will be the first step of annexation". He was also vehemently against the proposed cession of Pearl Harbor to the United States. Nāwahī and Pilipō were given the epithet of "Nā Pū Kuni Ahi o ka ʻAhaʻōlelo" (the Cannons of the Legislature) for their steadfast defense of Hawaiian sovereignty. In the election of 1886, Kalākaua personally journeyed to the districts of Pilipō and Nāwahī, on Hawaii, and John William Kalua, on Maui, to sway the vote against these three politicians. This resulted in Nāwahī's first electoral defeat in his home district of Hilo.

On June 30, 1887, King Kalākaua was forced to sign the Bayonet Constitution under duress by the Hawaiian League, a group of foreign businessman and Hawaiian subjects of American missionary descent including Lorrin A. Thurston. This constitution limited the absolute power of the monarch and strengthened the power of the executive cabinet. It also raised property requirements for suffrage, disenfranchised many poor Native Hawaiians and naturalized Asian citizens, and gave the vote to unnaturalized foreign residents of European or American descent. Instigators of this coup d'état formed the Reform Party, drawing its membership from Hawaiian conservatives and citizens of foreign descent. The new constitution also called for an election to be held ninety days after its enactment on September 12, 1887. Nāwahī remained an independent against the newly empowered Reform Party even though many of its members were his former allies against the National Party in years before. In the special election of 1887, he and George Charles Moʻoheau Beckley ran under the opposition ticket against Reform Party members Henry Deacon and D. Kamai but lost due to the disenfranchisement of much of the native constituencies. Deacon and Kamai would represent Hilo in the special legislative session of 1887 and the regular session of 1888. (Note: There was no election in 1888; sitting representatives continued to hold their seats during the 1888 session.)

The next general election of 1890 saw Nāwahī's return to the legislature. He ran as a National Reform party member and won the seat for the district of South Hilo. During this session, he became a supporter of Kalākaua and later his successor Queen Liliʻuokalani. In this session, Nāwahī joined with many other leading National Reform politicians in calling for a constitutional convention to draft a replacement to the existing Bayonet Constitution. A bill was drafted and submitted by Representative Kalua. However, when the constitutional convention bill went up for the vote of the legislature on October 1, it was defeated by a vote of 24 to 16.

=== Legislature of 1892–93 ===
In the election of 1892 Nāwahī changed party alliance and ran as a candidate for the newly created National Liberal Party, defeating Reform candidate Robert Rycroft for the seat of South Hilo in the House of Representatives. The Liberal Party advocated for a constitutional convention to draft a replacement to the unpopular Bayonet Constitution and increased Native Hawaiian participation in the government. The party was divided between radicals and more conciliatory groups. Nāwahī and William Pūnohu White (the representative of Lahaina) soon became the leaders of the factions of the Liberals loyal to the queen against the more radical members including John E. Bush and Robert William Wilcox, who were advocating for drastic changes such as increased power for the people and a republican form of government. Nāwahī was initially elected vice-president under Bush and later became the president of the Liberal Party.

From May 28, 1892, to January 14, 1893, the legislature of the Kingdom convened for an unprecedented 171 days, which later historian Albertine Loomis dubbed the "Longest Legislature". This session was characterized by a series of resolutions of want of confidence, resulting in the ousting of a number of Queen Liliʻuokalani's appointed cabinet ministers, and debates over the passage of the controversial lottery and opium bills. Nāwahī and six other legislators submitted petitions asking for a new constitution. During this session, Nāwahī also proposed a bill to the legislature to amend the constitution to give women the right to vote. The bill failed to pass. Had it been made into law, Hawaii would have preceded New Zealand as the first nation to allow women to vote.

On November 1, 1892, Nāwahī was appointed by Queen Liliʻuokalani as Minister of Foreign Affairs and to the short lived Cornwell Cabinet which consisted of William H. Cornwell, Charles T. Gulick and Charles F. Creighton. This cabinet existed for less than a day; it was ousted by the legislature with a vote of 26 to 13. Because he had to resign his spot in the legislature when he was appointed to the cabinet, a special election was held in Hilo to fill the vacant seat. Nāwahī was re-elected to his legislative seat in December by a "substantial majority".

Along with his political ally White, Nāwahī was decorated with the honor of Knight Commander of the Royal Order of Kalākaua, at a ceremony in the Blue Room of ʻIolani Palace, on the morning of January 14, for his work and patriotism during the legislative session. The legislative assembly was prorogued on the same day, two hours later, at a noon ceremony officiated by the queen at Aliʻiōlani Hale, which was situated across the street from the palace.

== During the overthrow ==
A strong proponent for a new constitution, Nāwahī helped Queen Liliʻuokalani draft the 1893 Constitution of the Kingdom of Hawaii. William Pūnohu White and Samuel Nowlein, captain of the Household Guard, were the other principal authors and contributors. These three had been meeting with the queen in secret since August 1892 after attempts to abrogate the Bayonet Constitution by legislative decision through a constitutional convention had proved largely unsuccessful. The proposed constitution would increase the power of the monarchy, restore voting rights to economically disenfranchised Native Hawaiians and Asians, and remove the property qualification for suffrage imposed by the Bayonet Constitution, among other changes. On the afternoon of January 14, after the knighting ceremony of White and Nāwahī and the prorogation of the legislature, members of Hui Kālaiʻāina and a delegation of native leaders marched to ʻIolani Palace with a sealed package containing the constitution. According to William DeWitt Alexander, this was pre-planned by the queen to take place while she met with her newly appointed cabinet ministers in the Blue Room of the palace. She was attempting to promulgate the constitution during the recess of the legislative assembly. However, these ministers, including Samuel Parker, William H. Cornwell, John F. Colburn, and Arthur P. Peterson, were either opposed to or reluctant to support the new constitution.

Crowds of citizens had gathered outside the steps and gates of ʻIolani Palace expecting the announcement of a new constitution. After the ministers' refusal to sign the new constitution, the queen stepped out onto the balcony asking the assembled people to return home, declaring "their wishes for a new constitution could not be granted just then, but will be some future day".

The political fallout of the queen's actions led to citywide political rallies and meetings in Honolulu. Anti-monarchists, annexationists, and leading Reformist politicians including Lorrin A. Thurston formed the Committee of Safety in protest of the "revolutionary" action of the queen and conspired to depose her. In response, royalists and loyalists formed the Committee of Law and Order and met at the palace square on January 16. Nāwahī, White, Bush, Wilcox, and Antone Rosa and other pro-monarchist leaders gave speeches in support for the queen and the government. However, in their attempts to be cautious and not provoke the opposition, they adopted a resolution stating that "the Government does not and will not seek any modification of the Constitution by any other means than those provided in the organic law".

== Opposing the overthrow and annexation ==
These actions and the radicalized political climate eventually led to the overthrow of the monarchy, on January 17, 1893, by the Committee of Safety, with the covert support of United States Minister John L. Stevens and the landing of American forces from the USS Boston. After a brief transition under the Provisional Government, the oligarchical Republic of Hawaii was established on July 4, 1894, with missionary descendant Sanford B. Dole as president. During this period, the de facto government, which was composed largely of residents of American and European ancestry, sought to annex the islands to the United States against the wishes of the Native Hawaiians who wanted to remain an independent nation ruled by the monarchy.

On March 4, 1893, Nāwahī became a founding member of Hui Aloha ʻĀina o Na Kane (Hawaiian Patriotic League for Men), a patriotic group founded shortly after the overthrow of the monarchy to oppose annexation and support the deposed queen. Nāwahī was elected President of the League later that year. The ranks of the group were largely composed of the leading native politicians of the former monarchy. A delegation was elected by its members to represent the case of the monarchy and the Hawaiian people to the United States Commissioner James Henderson Blount sent by President Grover Cleveland to investigate the overthrow. A corresponding female league, the Hui Aloha ʻĀina o Na Wahine (Hawaiian Women's Patriotic League), was founded in which Nāwahī's wife, Emma, was a leading member.

In December 1894, a search warrant was served on his Kapālama home looking for "sundry arms and ammunition." Although nothing was found, Nāwahī was arrested for treason and bail was set at 10,000 dollars. He spent nearly three months in jail until being bailed out.

In May 1895, following his release from prison, Nāwahī and his wife started the weekly publication of Ke Aloha Aina, an anti-annexationist newspaper written in the Hawaiian language. The paper ran from 1895 until 1920.

== Death and funeral ==
After his release, Nāwahī's health deteriorated from the tuberculosis he had contracted during his imprisonment in the damp cells of Oahu Prison. On the recommendation of his doctor to seek a change of climate, he and his wife left Hawaii for a trip to San Francisco, California to improve his health. They left Honolulu aboard the steamer Alameda on August 20, 1896, along with the families of Edward C. MacFarlane and Hermann A. Widemann, both influential royalists and former cabinet ministers of Liliʻuokalani. The Independent optimistically noted, "When our friend Joe comes back he may be able to hail a popular government in Hawaii". The trip did not have the expected outcome. On September 14, 1896, Nāwahī died in San Francisco, from tuberculosis. According to Silva, his last words were to his wife Emma, apologizing for "taking her so far from the 'äina and from her family and friends, to deal with his death alone in a foreign place."

Emma had the remains of her dead husband embalmed and returned to Hawaii for burial, arriving by the steamer Australia on September 29. His body was taken to his Kapalama residence in the city to lie in state. The following afternoon, the final service was conducted by Rev. Enoka Semaia Timoteo and a grand funeral followed, attended by many of his friends and supporters. The funeral was considered to be grand enough to befit a head of state, although Nāwahī had never held that position. Local press noted that the attendance and scale of the funeral had been unseen since Kalākaua's last rites in 1891. Even the flags above the Executive Building of the Republic (i. e. the former ʻIolani Palace) were lowered at half-mast during the funeral. The government of the Republic also sent a detachment of police officers and the Royal Hawaiian Band to participate in the funeral procession. The funeral procession ended at the dock where the steamer Hawaii took the coffin back to the island of Hawaii for burial.

During a brief stop on the island of Maui, hundreds of well-wishers came aboard the Hawaii to place bouquets and leis on the coffin of the deceased. The ship arrived in Hilo on October 2 and was escorted to shore by four whaleboats and four double canoes. The coffin lay in state at Halii Church. A second funeral service was held on Sunday, October 4, with Rev. Stephen L. Desha reading the Hawaiian language sermon. After the service, Nāwahī's remains were interred in Hilo's cemetery, known today as the Homelani Memorial Park.

Days after the ceremony, The Independent newspaper in Honolulu referred to the funeral attendance as "ocular evidence" of native resistance to the oligarchical Republic and President Dole:

Mr. Dole dare not face the issue. He knows that he and his ilk would be snowed under by an avalanche of adverse votes. He knows that the Hawaiians will not sacrifice their independence and tolerate the hoisting of the Stars and Stripes until blood has been shed and tho annexation of these islands taken the form of a conquest. If he does not know the true sentiments the Hawaiians he should have remained in town and received the ocular evidence in regard to the Hawaiians feelings given upon the death and funeral of the late Nawahi the demonstration in that instance could not be misunderstood. It was not Joseph Nawahi only who was honored and mourned over by the Hawaiian people. It was an object lesson given for the special benefit of Dole & Co., that not a single Hawaiian has swerved from his true allegiance to his country and that at the grave of the lamented patriot they stood shoulder to shoulder, men and women, from Hawaii to Niihau, in righteous defense of their country and in their eternal hatred of their oppressors.

== Hawaiian artist ==
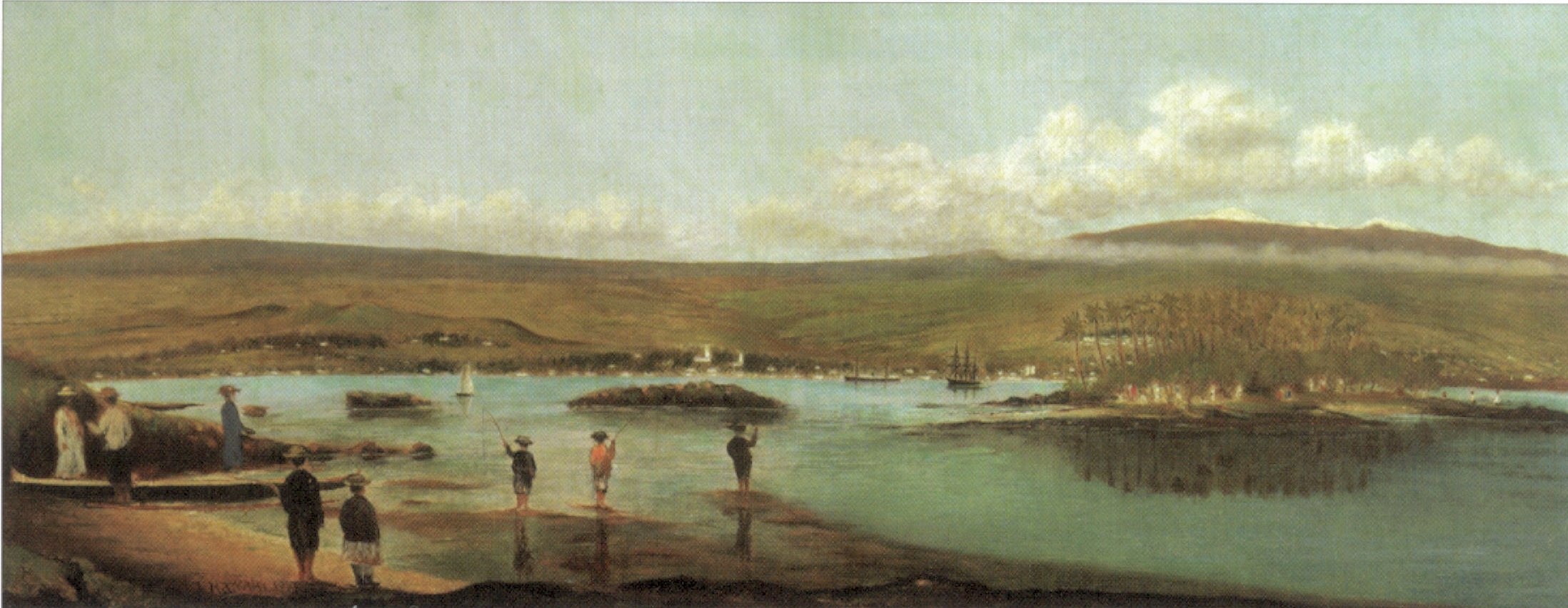
"View of Hilo Bay", oil painting 1888, Kamehameha Schools, Honolulu

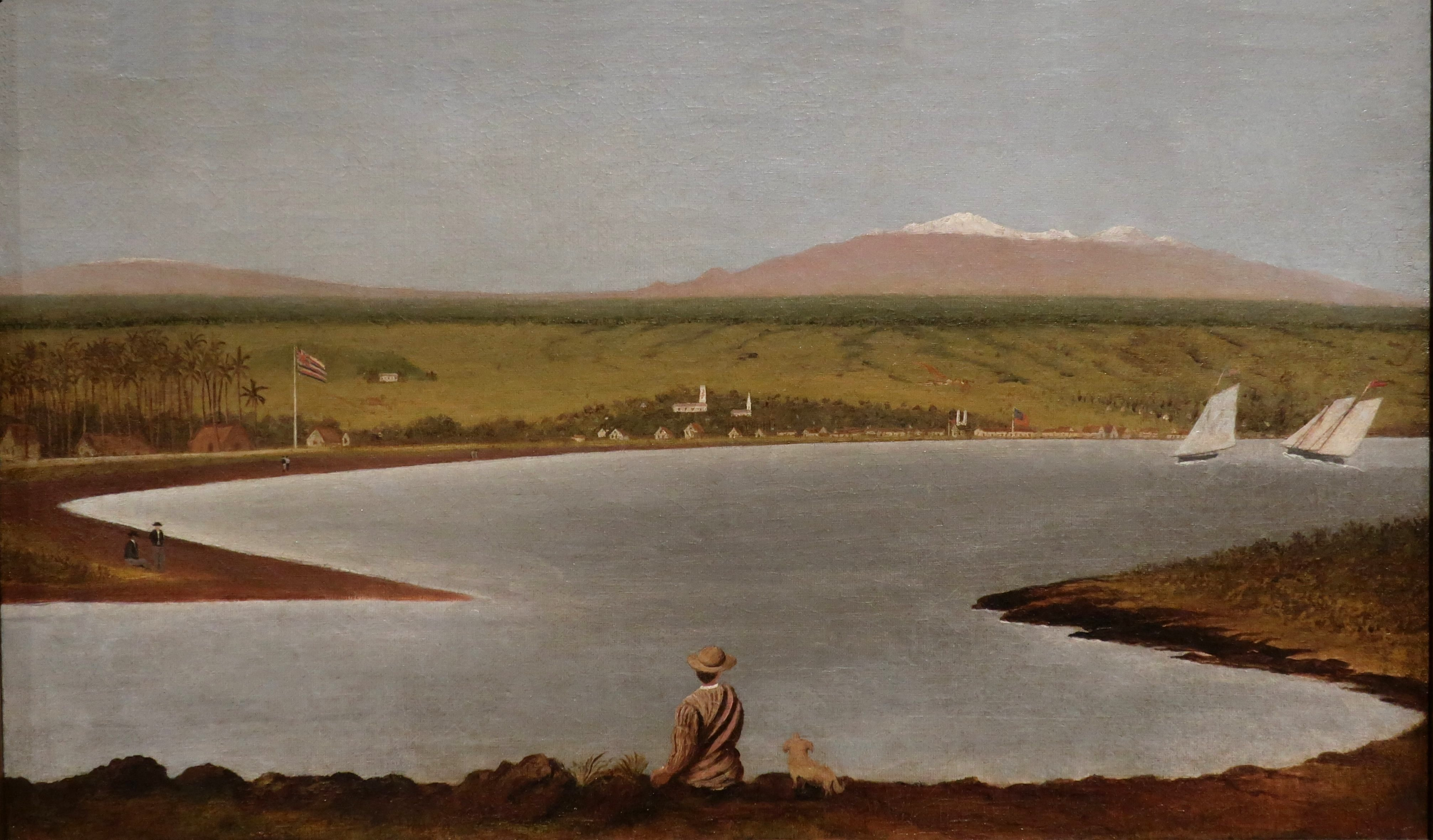
"Hilo Bay'", oil painting, circa 1868, Mission Houses Museum, Honolulu

Nāwahī was believed to be a self-taught artist with details surrounding his early training in the arts relatively unknown. His attendance at Lahainaluna may have influenced his early interest in art. Lorrin Andrews, the first principal of Lahainaluna, had taught many of his Hawaiian students in the arts. He was also part of the late 19th-century Volcano School style of artists. Art historian David Forbes noted that Nāwahī may have been taught or influenced by the French artist Jules Tavernier, a strong proponent of the Volcano School movement in Hawaii. Nāwahī is considered to have been one of the first Native Hawaiians to paint in the Western style.

Only five or six of his paintings are known to exist along with two pen and ink sketches he left on the Volcano House guest registry book. Nāwahī's surviving works consisted of views of his native Hilo including Hilo Bay, Rainbow (Waiānuenue) Falls and the surrounding volcanoes of Mauna Loa, Mauna Kea and Kilauea. One of his paintings of the fiery caldera of Kīlauea was recognized by the Hawaiian government and sent to the Paris Universal Exposition in 1889.

His painting of Hilo Bay was discovered in 1984. It was informally valued at $100,000 to $150,000 in 2006 on the TV program Antiques Roadshow and was later professionally appraised at more than $450,000; the owner donated it to Kamehameha Schools in 2007.

== Legacy ==
Admired as a renaissance man, Nāwahī has become a key figure in understanding the history of the Hawaiian monarchy and sovereignty. Puakea Nogelmeier, an associate professor of Hawaiian language at the University of Hawaii at Manoa, notes that Nāwahī is admired for several reasons. "He's handsome, he's intelligent, he's well-spoken, he's well educated," but above all, "His personal ethics were unimpeachable." Today, a Hawaiian Medium Education school is named in his honor is in Keaʻau, in the Puna district on the island of Hawaiʻi. Ke Kula ʻo Nāwahīokalaniʻōpuʻu educates students from grades K-12 in the Hawaiian language. In 1999, this school was one of two that graduated the first high school classes to have been educated entirely in the Hawaiian language in a century. In 2008 a crater on the planet Mercury was named for him.

A documentary film titled "Biography Hawaiʻi: Joseph Nāwahī" was produced in 2008 based on his life. The premiere was on June 25, 2009 on PBS Hawaii. The title role was played by Professor Kalena Silva of the University of Hawaii at Hilo, and partially filmed at the Lyman House.

== Honors ==
- Knight Commander of the Royal Order of Kalākaua.

== See also ==
- List of first minority male lawyers and judges in Hawaii

== Bibliography ==
- Alexander, William DeWitt (1896). History of Later Years of the Hawaiian Monarchy and the Revolution of 1893. Honolulu: Hawaiian Gazette Company. OCLC 11843616.
- Allen, Helena G. (1982). The Betrayal of Liliuokalani: Last Queen of Hawaii, 1838–1917. Glendale, CA: A. H. Clark Company. ISBN 978-0-87062-144-4. OCLC 9576325.
- Andrade, Ernest (1996). Unconquerable Rebel: Robert W. Wilcox and Hawaiian Politics, 1880–1903. Niwot, CO: University Press of Colorado. pp. 75, 89, 99, 108–109, 124, 151, 152. ISBN 978-0-87081-417-4. OCLC 247224388.
- Blount, James Henderson (1895). The Executive Documents of the House of Representatives for the Third Session of the Fifty-Third Congress, 1893–'94 in Thirty-Five Volumes. Washington, DC: U.S. Government Printing Office. OCLC 191710879.
- Canevali, Ralph C. (1977). "Hilo Boarding School – Hawaii's Experiment in Vocational Education" (PDF). The Hawaiian Journal of History. 11. Honolulu: Hawaiian Historical Society: 77–96. hdl:10524/621. OCLC 60626541.
- Chapin, Helen G. (2000). Guide to Newspapers of Hawaiʻi: 1834–2000. Honolulu: Hawaiian Historical Society. hdl:10524/1444. OCLC 45330644.
- Clark, Herman Piʻikea (2011). Harris, Jonathan (ed.). "Ka Muheʻe, He Iʻa Hololua: Kanaka Maoli Art and the Challenge of the Global Market". Globalization and Contemporary Art. Malden, MA: Wiley-Blackwel: 137–146. ISBN 978-1-4443-9699-7. OCLC 773581244. Archived from the original on November 16, 2018 – via Questia.
- Dabagh, Jean; Lyons, Curtis Jere; Hitchcock, Harvey Rexford (1974). Dabagh, Jean (ed.). "A King is Elected: One Hundred Years Ago" (PDF). The Hawaiian Journal of History. 8. Honolulu: Hawaiian Historical Society: 76–89. hdl:10524/112. OCLC 60626541.
- Dudoit, D. Mähealani, ed. (1998). ʻÖiwi: A Native Hawaiian Journal. Vol. 1. Honolulu: Kuleana ʻÖiwi Press. ISBN 0-9668220-1-3. OCLC 402770968.
  - Silva, Noenoe K. "Kanaka Maoli Resistance to Annexation". In Dudoit (1998), pp. 40–75.
  - Like, Edward L.; Nawahi, Emma A.; Silva, Noenoe K. "Editorial of Ke Aloha Aina". In Dudoit (1998), pp. 76–105.
- Dudoit, D. Mähealani, ed. (2002). ʻÖiwi: A Native Hawaiian Journal. Vol. 2. Honolulu: Kuleana ʻÖiwi Press. ISBN 0-9668220-2-1. OCLC 402770968.
  - Like, Edward L.; Nawahi, Emma A.; Silva, Noenoe K. "Translations of Articles from the Hawaiian Nationalist Newspaper Ke Aloha Aina". In Dudoit (2002), pp. 118–138.
- Earle, David Williams (December 1993). Coalition Politics in Hawaiʻi· 1887–90: Hui Kālaiʻāina and the Mechanics and Workingmen's Political Protective Union (M.A. thesis). Honolulu: University of Hawaii at Manoa. hdl:10125/21097.
- Feldman, Jerome (1992). "News and Events". Pacific Arts (6). Honolulu: Pacific Arts Association: 70–72. JSTOR 23409095. OCLC 646827036.
- Forbes, David W. (1992). Encounters with Paradise: Views of Hawaii and Its People, 1778–1941. Honolulu: Honolulu Academy of Arts. ISBN 978-0-7103-0454-4. OCLC 24550242.
- Haley, James L. (2014). Captive Paradise: A History of Hawaii. New York: St. Martin's Press. ISBN 978-0-312-60065-5. OCLC 865158092.
- Hawaii (1918). Lydecker, Robert Colfax (ed.). Roster Legislatures of Hawaii, 1841–1918. Honolulu: Hawaiian Gazette Company. OCLC 60737418.
- Higashi, Kuʻulei; Wilson, William H. (1999). Iosepa Kahoʻoluhi Nāwahīokalaniʻōpuʻu. Hilo: ʻAha Pūnana Leo. ISBN 978-1-58191-081-0. OCLC 54793365.
- Ho'omanawanui, Ku'ualoha (2015). "Ka Li'u o Ka Pa'Akai (Well Seasoned with Salt): Recognizing Literary Devices, Rhetorical Strategies, and Aesthetics in Kanaka Maoli Literature". In Jeffrey Carroll; et al. (eds.). Huihui: Navigating Art and Literature in the Pacific. Honolulu: University of Hawaiʻi Press. pp. 247–265. ISBN 978-0-8248-3895-9. JSTOR j.ctt14tqcww.24. OCLC 908252739.
- Kanahele, George S. (1999). Emma: Hawaii's Remarkable Queen. Honolulu: University of Hawaii Press. ISBN 978-0-8248-2240-8. OCLC 40890919.
- Kuykendall, Ralph Simpson (1967). The Hawaiian Kingdom 1874–1893, The Kalakaua Dynasty. Vol. 3. Honolulu: University of Hawaii Press. ISBN 978-0-87022-433-1. OCLC 500374815.
- Liliuokalani (1898). Hawaii's Story by Hawaii's Queen, Liliuokalani. Boston: Lee and Shepard. ISBN 978-0-548-22265-2. OCLC 2387226.
- Loomis, Albertine (1963). "The Longest Legislature" (PDF). Seventy-First Annual Report of the Hawaiian Historical Society for the Year 1962. 71. Honolulu: Hawaiian Historical Society: 7–27. hdl:10524/35.
- MacLennan, Carol A. (2014). Sovereign Sugar: Industry and Environment in Hawaiʻi. Honolulu: University of Hawaii Press. ISBN 978-0-8248-3949-9. OCLC 865543781. - Available on Project MUSE
- McKinzie, Edith Kawelohea (1986). Stagner, Ishmael W. (ed.). Hawaiian Genealogies: Extracted from Hawaiian Language Newspapers. Vol. 2. Honolulu: University of Hawaii Press. ISBN 978-0-939154-37-1. OCLC 12555087.
- Menton, Linda K.; Tamura, Eileen (1999). A History of Hawaii, Student Book. Honolulu: Curriculum Research & Development Group. ISBN 978-0-937049-94-5. OCLC 49753910.
- Osorio, Jon Kamakawiwoʻole (2002). Dismembering Lāhui: A History of the Hawaiian Nation to 1887. Honolulu: University of Hawaii Press. ISBN 0-8248-2549-7. OCLC 48579247.
- Proto, Neil Thomas (2009). The Rights of My People: Liliuokalani's Enduring Battle with the United States, 1893–1917. New York: Algora Publishing. ISBN 978-0-87586-720-5. OCLC 319248358.
- Severson, Don R.; Horikawa, Michael D.; Saville, Jennifer (2002). Finding Paradise: Island Art in Private Collections. Honolulu: Honolulu Academy of Arts; University of Hawaiʻi Press. ISBN 978-0-8248-2657-4. OCLC 123158782.
- Sheldon, John G. M.; Like, Edward L.; Prendergast, John K. (1996) [1908]. Ka Puke Moʻolelo o Hon. Joseph K. Nāwahī (in Hawaiian). Hilo, HI: Hale Kuamoʻo, Ka Haka ʻUla o Keʻelikōlani. ISBN 978-0-9665331-2-5. OCLC 44037613.
- Silva, Noenoe K. (2004). Aloha Betrayed: Native Hawaiian Resistance to American Colonialism. Durham: Duke University Press. ISBN 0-8223-8622-4. OCLC 191222123.
- Twigg-Smith, Thurston (1998). Hawaiian Sovereignty: Do the Facts Matter?. Honolulu: Goodale Publishing. ISBN 978-0-9662945-0-7. OCLC 39090004.
- Williams, Ronald Jr. (2015). "Race, Power, and the Dilemma of Democracy: Hawaiʻi's First Territorial Legislature, 1901". The Hawaiian Journal of History. 49. Honolulu: Hawaiian Historical Society: 1–45. doi:10.1353/hjh.2015.0017. hdl:10524/56604. OCLC 60626541. S2CID 155592084 – via Project MUSE.
