= Hui Aloha ʻĀina =

Two Hawaiian nationalist organizations

Hui Aloha ʻĀina were two Hawaiian nationalist organizations (one for men and another for women) established by Native Hawaiian political leaders and statesmen and their spouses in the aftermath of the overthrow of the Hawaiian Kingdom and Queen Liliʻuokalani on January 17, 1893. The organization was formed to promote Hawaiian patriotism and independence and oppose the overthrow and the annexation of Hawaii to the United States. Its members organized and collected the Kūʻē Petitions to oppose the annexation, which ultimately blocked a treaty of annexation in the United States Senate in 1897.

== Names ==
The official name according to both organizations' constitution was Ka Hui Hawaii Aloha ʻĀina (The Hawaiian Patriotic League). The two organizations have also been called Ka Hui Hawaiʻi Aloha ʻĀina o Na Kane and Ka Hui Hawaiʻi Aloha ʻĀina o Na Wahine or Ka Hui Hawaiʻi Aloha ʻĀina o Na Lede. During the funeral processions of Princess Kaʻiulani and Queen Kapiʻolani in 1899, the organizations were referred to as Ahahui Aloha Aina and Ahahui Aloha Aina o na Wahine, respectively. The word hui in both organizations' names is the Hawaiian word for a social or community group.

The Hawaiian Patriotic League was also the name of another secret organization founded between 1887 and 1893. Its members included Robert William Wilcox and Volney V. Ashford.

== History ==
The organization was founded on March 4, 1893, two and half months after the overthrow of Queen Liliʻuokalani by pro-American forces within the kingdom who established the Provisional Government of Hawaii. The founding officers of Hui Aloha ʻĀina were Joseph Nāwahī, John Adams Cummins, John K. Kaunamano and John W. Bipikane, who were all former legislators or ministers in the Hawaiian monarchical government during the reigns of Liliʻuokalani and her predecessor King Kalākaua.

The objective of the organization was to promote Hawaiian patriotism and independence, oppose the overthrow, restore the monarchy, oppose the rule of the Provisional Government and its successor the Republic of Hawaii and oppose any attempts annexation of the Hawaiian Islands to the United States.

Nāwahī was elected president while Cummins was elected honorary president. The four vice presidents in 1893 were John E. Bush, John Lot Kaulukoʻu, Kaunamano and Bipikane. By July 1893, the organization claimed total membership of 7,500 native-born Hawaiian qualified voters (out of 13,000 registered voters) and a women's league of over 11,000 members.

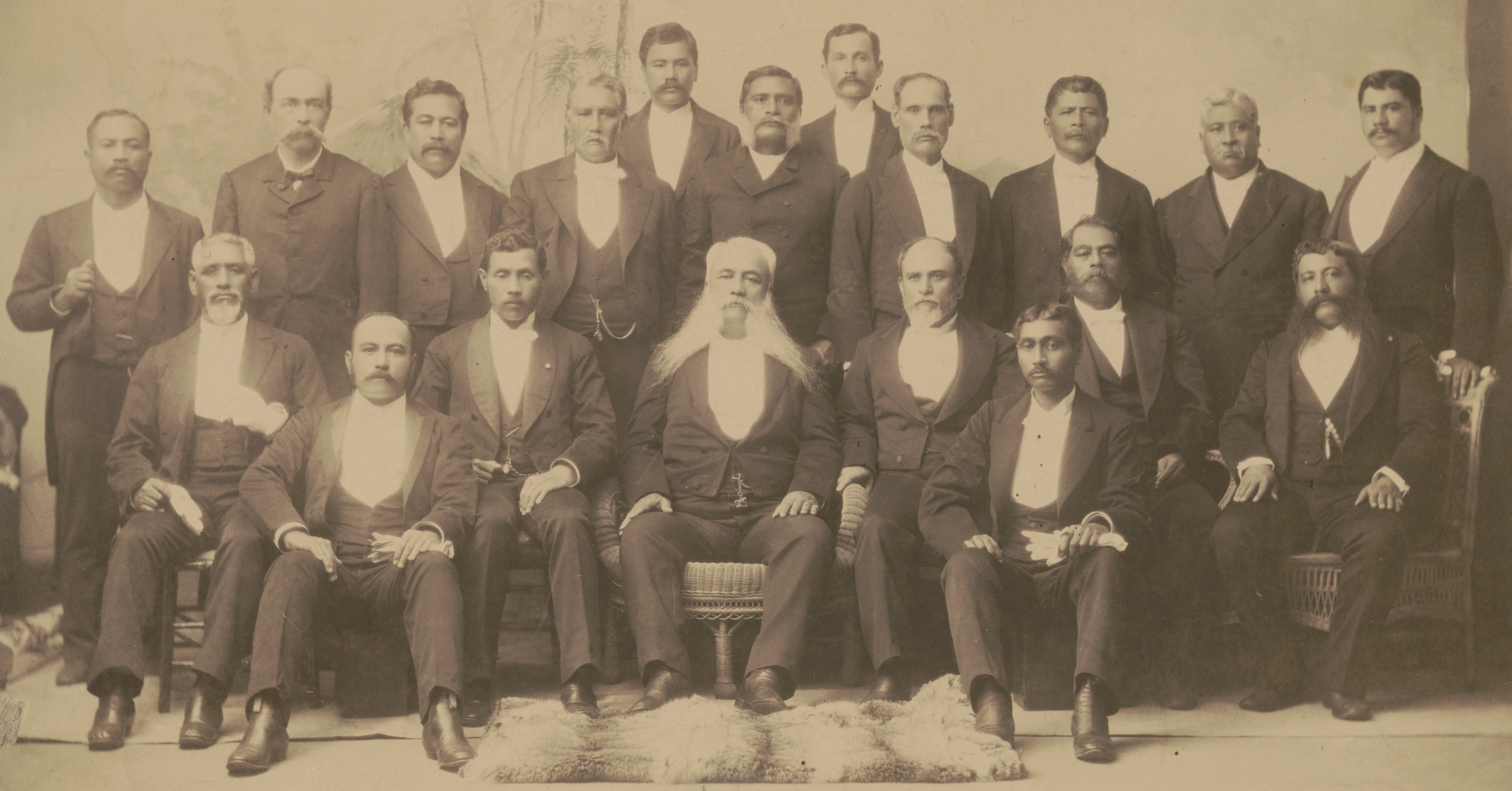
Representatives of the Hui Aloha ʻĀina o Na Kane, 1893

A delegation of members presented the case of the monarchy and the Hawaiian people to the United States Commissioner James Henderson Blount who was sent by President Grover Cleveland to investigate the overthrow.

After Nāwahī's death in September 1896, delegates from the different island branches of Hui Aloha ʻĀina met in Honolulu for the election of a new leadership council on November 28, 1896, which coincided with Lā Kūʻokoʻa (Hawaiian Independence Day). In this meeting, James Keauiluna Kaulia was elected as the new president and William Pūnohu White as honorary president. Vice presidents elected were Kaunamano, Bipikane, Bush, and Edward Kamakau Lilikalani.

In anticipation of a new vote on an annexation treaty supported by President William McKinley, Hui Aloha ʻĀina and other Hawaiian nationalist groups collected the Kūʻē Petitions to oppose the treaty's ratification in the United States Senate. Members of Hui Aloha ʻĀina for Men and Hui Aloha ʻĀina for Women collected over 21,000 signatures across the island chain opposing annexation in 1897. Another 17,000 signatures were collected by members of Hui Kālaiʻāina but not submitted to the Senate because those signatures were also asking for restoration of the monarchy. These were submitted by a commission of Native Hawaiian delegates consisting of Kaulia, David Kalauokalani (president of Hui Kālaiʻāina), William Auld, and John Richardson to the United States government. The petitions collectively were presented as evidence of the strong grassroots opposition of the Hawaiian community to annexation, and the treaty was defeated in the Senate.

However, a year following the defeat of the treaty in the Senate, Hawaii was annexed via the Newlands Resolution, a joint resolution of Congress, in July 1898. This was done shortly after the outbreak of the Spanish–American War and necessitated by the strategic position of Hawaii as a Pacific military base.

In May 1895, Joseph Nāwahī and Emma Nāwahī also founded Ke Aloha Aina, a weekly anti-annexationist newspaper written in the Hawaiian language to promote Hawaiian independence and opposition to American annexation. The paper ran from 1895 until 1920.

== Hui Aloha ‘Āina o Nā Wāhine (The Women's Hawaiian Patriotic League) ==
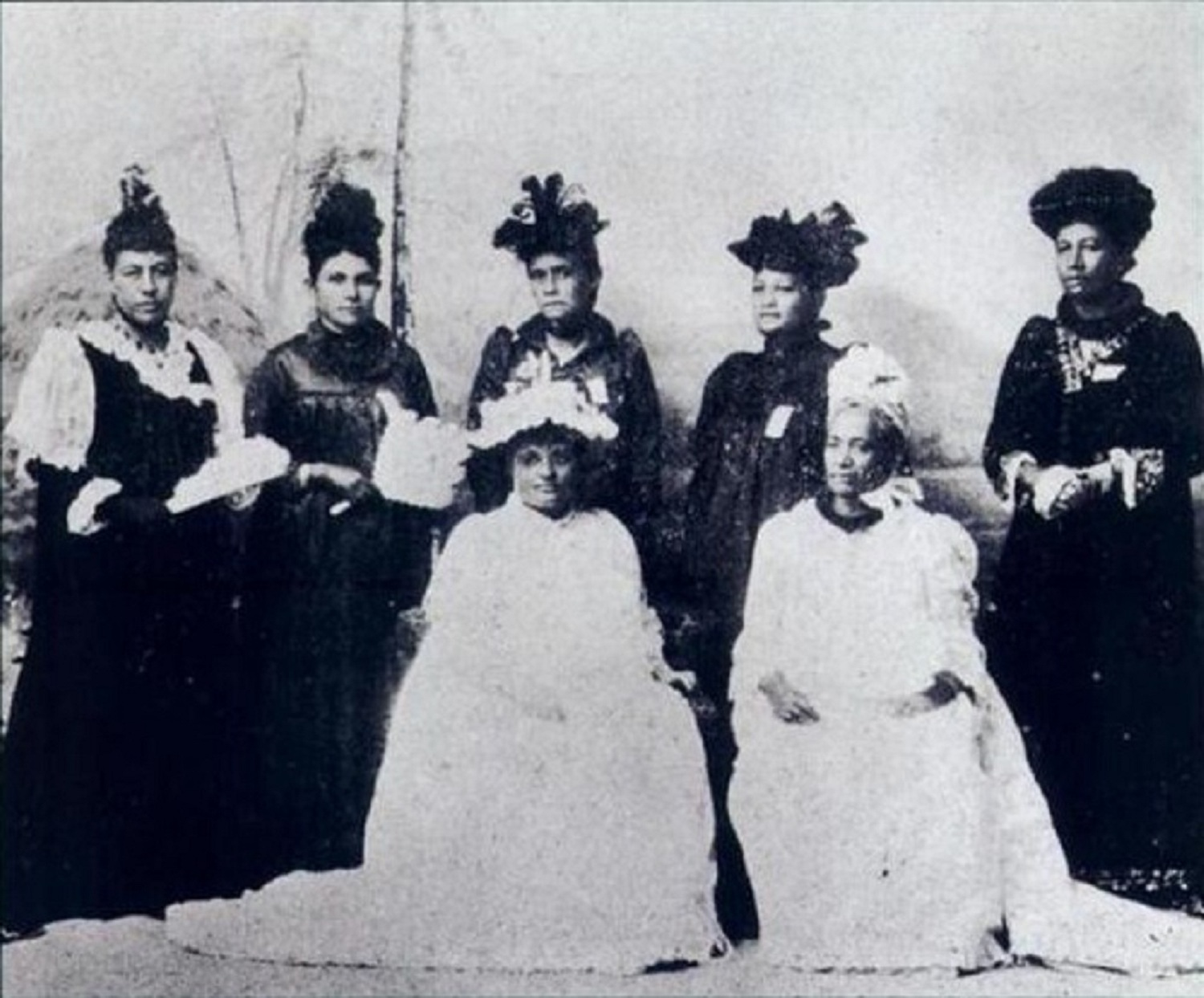
Representatives of the Hui Aloha ʻĀina o Nā Wāhine, 1893

A corresponding women's organization named Hui Aloha ʻĀina o Nā Wāhine (Hawaiian Women's Patriotic League) was founded on March 27, 1893. Formed by prominent nationalist women in the aftermath of the overthrow of the Hawaiian Kingdom, the women’s league opposed both the Provisional Government and the subsequent annexation of Hawaiʻi to the United States. Emilie Widemann Macfarlane (1859-1947), the part-Hawaiian daughter of Hermann A. Widemann (1822-1899), founded Hui Aloha ʻĀina o Nā Wāhine. Martha Widemann Berger (1855-1933, Macfarlane's sister) and Abigail Kuaihelani Campbell (1858-1908) were elected vice-presidents. Honorary presidents included Mary Robinson Foster (1844-1933), Elizabeth Kekaʻaniau Pratt (1834-1928), Rebecca Kahalewai Cummins, Bathsheba Robinson Allen, and Irene ʻĪʻī Brown Holloway (1869-1922). Emma Nāwahī was also a founding member.

=== Establishment and structure ===
The women’s league was founded shortly after the 1893 coup that overthrew Queen Liliʻuokalani. It formed in parallel with the men’s branch of Hui Aloha ʻĀina (The Hawaiian Patriotic League). While both the men’s and women’s league were aligned in terms of their goals and often coordinated with each other, the women’s league operated through an independent governing structure. Its constitution aligned with that of the men’s league, including provisions for a central governing body and district branches throughout the islands. Article Five of this independent Constitution required that all officers of the League be Native Hawaiian and elected by ballot, which reflected the organization’s desire to preserve Native Hawaiian political agency.

By late 1893, the women’s league reported about 11,000 members, which was significantly larger than the men’s branch, which had approximately 7,500 members during the same period of time. Queen Liliʻuokalani identified the women’s league as an organization that challenged the oligarchy now ruling Hawai‘i, showing the league's broad popular support and its highly coordinated political activities.

On April 17, 1893, Macfarlane and a small group of younger Hawaiian women resigned their positions, after a dispute arose between two factions of the group over the wording to the memorial seeking the restoration of the monarchy to be presented to the United States Commissioner James Henderson Blount (1837-1903) sent by President Grover Cleveland (1837-1908) to investigate the overthrow. The organization elected Abigail Kuaihelani Campbell as the organization's next president.

=== Political activities, 1893–1898 ===
==== Protests against the overthrow and provisional government ====
Immediately after the overthrow of the Hawaiian monarchy in 1893, the women’s league began issuing formal protests to U.S. Commissioner Blount. On April 18, 1893, an executive body of seven members: Campbell, Nāwahi, Rebecca Kahalewai Cummins, Mary Ann Kaulalani Parker Stillman, Jessie Kapaihi Kaae, Hattie K. Hiram, and Laura Kekupuwolui Mahelona submitted a petition to Blount. Their petition called for preventing the American pursuit of power and material gain from disrupting the well-being of the islands, and it criticized the political turmoil and unrest that a small group of foreigners.

In addition to petitions to the U.S. government, the women’s league submitted protest letters to foreign ministers of several nations, such as England, France, Germany, Portugal, and Japan. They expressed their distaste for the Provisional Government’s proposed constitution.

Women in the organization also took on the responsibility of supporting families adversely affected by political unrest.After the counter-revolution attempt of 1895, organization members tended to imprisoned men’s families, those in need, and the homeless, filling social support roles from which Native Hawaiians were excluded as political power shifted towards foreign elites.

==== The 1897 anti-annexation petition campaign ====
One of the most significant achievements of the women's league was its leadership in organizing the 1897 Anti-Annexation Petition Campaign, also known as Kūʻē Petitions. Working alongside the men’s Hui Aloha ʻĀina, the women’s league coordinated signature-gathering throughout the islands to oppose the proposed treaty of annexation submitted by President William McKinley.

Other prominent women organizers played significant roles: Laura Mahelona collected 4,216 signatures in the Kona and Kaʻū districts, while Annie Kaikioʻewa Ulukou obtained 2,375 signatures on the island of Kauaʻi. In total, the petitions gathered over 21,000 signatures from men and women, in roughly equal numbers. When combined with signatures collected by the men’s league and Hui Kālaiʻāina (Hawaiian Political Association), the broader anti-annexation movement submitted approximately 38,000 signatures, representing the overwhelming will of the Native Hawaiian population.

These groups collectively sent petitions to Washington D.C., where they proved influential in preventing Senate approval of the annexation treaty. Although Hawaiʻi was ultimately annexed in 1898 through the Newlands Resolution, the petitions remain a very significant example of collective Native Hawaiian political action.

=== Prominent leadership ===
==== Abigail Kuaihelani Campbell ====
Abigail Kuaihelani Campbell, who is of chiefly Maui descent, served as president of the women's league and was widely recognized as one of the most influential Native Hawaiian political leaders of the annexation period. Campbell maintained her own extensive estate independent from that of her husband, businessman James Campbell. Beyond her political work, she was also known for her philanthropic efforts, which included supporting elderly Hawaiian pensioners and paying medical expenses for Hawaiians not receiving government assistance.

Her political identity was reflected by the name “Eueu o Lahaina,” roughly translating to "The energetic youth of Lahaina," which signaled her powerful role in advocating for Native Hawaiian rights. Campbell participated in coordinating the collection of signatures for the Kūʻē Petitions of 1897 which displayed Hawaiian rejection of annexation and served on decision-making committees alongside male leaders, indicating her involvement in the broader nationalist movement.

==== Emma ʻAʻima Nāwahī ====
Emma ʻAʻima Nāwahī was the wife of a legislator and Hui Aloha ʻĀina co-founder, Joseph K. Nāwahī. She served as the principal organizer and a prominent public figure within the women’s league. She co-managed the influential nationalist newspaper Ke Aloha Aina (The Love of the Land) with her husband. Following her husband’s death, she became both the editor and business manager of the newspaper, ensuring that it became central to the Hawaiian nationalist movement.

Nāwahī also co-led several women’s political organizations and traveled extensively across Hawaii gathering signatures for anti-annexation petitions, often alongside Campbell. Communities often received her positively, indicating both her individual role and the broader significance of women activists within the movement.

=== Influence and legacy ===
After the annexation of Hawai‘i, Hui Aloha ʻĀina o Nā Wāhine (The Women's Hawaiian Patriotic League) remained politically and socially active. Although women were legally excluded from voting under the laws of the U.S. at the time, they asserted political influence by representing the Hawaiian people in decision-making committees and sustaining nationalist institutions such as the newspaper Ke Aloha Aina (The Love of the Land). Their organizational strength contributed to the women’s league being viewed as an important part of Hawaiian political life.

== Dissolution and legacy ==
The organization merged with Hui Kālaiʻāina to form the Hawaiian Home Rule Party in 1900. Kalauokalani was elected president and Kaulia as vice-president of the new political party.

In 1996, historian Noenoe K. Silva discovered the 21,269 signatures of the Kūʻē Petitions by Hui Aloha ʻĀina in the National Archives in Washington, DC, but the whereabout of the original Hui Kālaiʻāina petition remains unknown.

== Delegates of Hui Aloha ʻĀina o Na Kane, 1893 ==
This list is not a complete list of all delegates or officers of Hui Aloha ʻĀina o Na Kane:

Hawaii

Name	District	Notes	Sources
S. T. Piihonua	Hawaii	Also listed as "S. T. Piihonu"	
Henry West	Hawaii		
K. M. Koahou	Hawaii		
D. Hoakimou	Hawaii		
T. P. Kaaeae	Hawaii		
J. H. Halawale	Hawaii		
S. H. K. Ne	Hawaii		
W. E. N. Kanealii	Hawaii		
C. G. Naope	Hawaii		

Maui

Name	District	Notes	Sources
Ramon Hoe Makekau	Maui		
J. K. Kealoalii	Maui		
David Kanuha	Maui	or "David Kanaha" or "D. Kanuha"	
John Richardson	Maui		
Thomas Clark	Maui		
Thomas Benjamin Lyons	Maui		
John Kaluna	Maui		
J. Kamakele	Maui		
S. D. Kapers	Maui		
S. W. Kaai	Maui		
D. S. Kapono Opio	Maui	Not listed in Blount Report	
S. W. Kaai	Maui		

Molokai

Name	District	Notes	Sources
J. N. Uahinui	Molokai		
J. K. Kaipeopulani	Molokai	Also listed as "J. K. Kaiheopuolani"	
D. Himeni	Molokai		
J. P. Kapoehaale	Molokai		
Kekoowai	Molokai	Or "S. K. Kekoawai"	
S. K. Kahalehulu	Molokai	Also listed as "S. K. Kahalehuli"	
S. K. Piiapoo	Molokai		
A. P. Paehaole	Molokai	Not listed in Blount Report	

Oahu

Name	District	Notes	Sources
F. S. Keiki	Oahu	Also listed as F. S. Keike	
C. Keawe	Oahu		
John Kapumawaiio Prendergast	Oahu	Also listed as "John Kapamawaho Prendergast"	
Enoch Johnson	Oahu		
Samuel K. Pua	Oahu		
J. K. Kaupu	Oahu	Listed as "J. K. Kaupu" or "S. K. Kaupu"	
D. W. Keliiokamoku	Oahu		
S. W. Kailieha	Oahu		
Benjamin Naukana	Oahu		
Kimo	Oahu		
D. K. Keliimoku	Oahu	Not listed in Blount Report	
David William Pua	Oahu	Not listed in Blount Report	
John Lot Kaulukoʻu	Oahu	Not listed in Blount Report	

Kauai

Name	District	Notes	Sources
Charles Kaheʻe	Kauai	Also listed as "Charles Kaho"	
George W. Mahikoa	Kauai		
Joseph Apukai Akina	Kauai		
John W. Kamaliʻikane	Kauai	Also listed as "D. N. Kamaliikaue"	
Samuel P. Kaleikini	Kauai		
John Molokai	Kauai	Listed as "John Molokai" or "J. Molokui"	

Members in 1893 photograph

Portrait	Name	Notes	Sources
	Sam M. Kaaukai		
	John W. Bipikane		
	Henry Stuart Swinton		
	James Keauiluna Kaulia		
	Luther W. P. Kanealii		
	Joseph Nāwahī		
	John Sam Kikukahiko		
	Samuel K. Aki		
	John Adams Cummins		
	David William Pua		
	John Kapumawaiio Prendergast	Also listed as "John Kapamawaho Prendergast"	
	Aberahama Kaikioewa Palekaluhi		
	John E. Bush		
	John Mahiai Kaneakua		
	Frank Samuel Keiki		
	John K. Kaunamano		
	John Kekipi		
	John Lota Kaulukou		
	James Kahai Merseburg		

== Bibliography ==
- "The Annexation of Hawaii: A Collection of Documents – Petition Introduction". University of Hawaiʻi at Mānoa Library.
- Akana, Kalani (July 31, 2024). "Heroes of Hawaiian advocacy on Lā Hoʻihoʻi Ea". Kamehameha Schools.
- Blount, James Henderson (1895). The Executive Documents of the House of Representatives for the Third Session of the Fifty-Third Congress, 1893–'94 in Thirty-Five Volumes. Washington, DC: U.S. Government Printing Office. OCLC 191710879.
- Chapin, Helen G. (2000). Guide to Newspapers of Hawaiʻi: 1834–2000. Honolulu: Hawaiian Historical Society. hdl:10524/1444. OCLC 45330644.
- Dudoit, D. Mähealani (2019). "1. Against Extinction: A Legacy of Native Hawaiian Resistance Literature". Voices of Social Justice and Diversity in a Hawaiʻi Context: Grandparents, Grandchildren, Schools, Communities, and Churches. Leiden: BRILL. pp. 45–62. ISBN 978-90-04-38754-6. OCLC 1121642768.
- Dudoit, D. Mähealani, ed. (1998). ʻÖiwi: A Native Hawaiian Journal. Vol. 1. Honolulu: Kuleana ʻÖiwi Press. ISBN 0-9668220-1-3. OCLC 402770968.
  - Silva, Noenoe K. "Kanaka Maoli Resistance to Annexation". In Dudoit (1998), pp. 40–75.
  - Like, Edward L.; Nawahi, Emma A.; Silva, Noenoe K. "Editorial of Ke Aloha Aina". In Dudoit (1998), pp. 76–105.
- Dudoit, D. Mähealani, ed. (2002). ʻÖiwi: A Native Hawaiian Journal. Vol. 2. Honolulu: Kuleana ʻÖiwi Press. ISBN 0-9668220-2-1. OCLC 402770968.
  - Like, Edward L.; Nawahi, Emma A.; Silva, Noenoe K. "Translations of Articles from the Hawaiian Nationalist Newspaper Ke Aloha Aina". In Dudoit (2002), pp. 118–138.
- Forbes, David W., ed. (2003). Hawaiian National Bibliography, 1780–1900, Volume 4: 1881–1900. Vol. 4. Honolulu: University of Hawaii Press. ISBN 978-0-8248-2636-9. OCLC 123279964.
- Goodyear-Kaʻōpua, Noelani; Kuwada, Bryan Kamaoli (2018). "Making 'Aha: Independent Hawaiian Pasts, Presents & Futures". Daedalus. 147 (2): 49–59. JSTOR 48563027.
- Haley, James L. (2014). Captive Paradise: A History of Hawaii. New York: St. Martin's Press. ISBN 978-0-312-60065-5. OCLC 865158092.
- Ho, Fred Wei-han (2000). Legacy to Liberation: Politics and Culture of Revolutionary Asian Pacific America. Edinburgh: AK Press. ISBN 978-1-902593-24-1. OCLC 247425124.
- Hune, Shirley; Nomura, Gail M. (2003). Asian/Pacific Islander American Women: A Historical Anthology. New York: NYU Press. ISBN 978-0-8147-3633-3. OCLC 237796795.
- Kam, Ralph Thomas (2017). Death Rites and Hawaiian Royalty: Funerary Practices in the Kamehameha and Kalakaua Dynasties, 1819–1953. S. I.: McFarland, Incorporated, Publishers. ISBN 978-1-4766-6846-8. OCLC 966566652.
- Kauanui, J. Kēhaulani (2008). Hawaiian Blood: Colonialism and the Politics of Sovereignty and Indigeneity. Durham, NC: Duke University Press. ISBN 978-0-8223-9149-4. OCLC 308649636.
- Kuykendall, Ralph Simpson (1967). The Hawaiian Kingdom 1874–1893, The Kalakaua Dynasty. Vol. 3. Honolulu: University of Hawaii Press. ISBN 978-0-87022-433-1. OCLC 500374815.
- Mehmed, Ali (1998). "Hoʻohuiʻaina Pala Ka Maiʻa: Remembering Annexation One Hundred Years Ago". The Hawaiian Journal of History. 32. Honolulu: Hawaiian Historical Society: 141–154. hdl:10524/358. OCLC 60626541.
- Pukui, Mary Kawena; Elbert, Samuel H. (1986). Hawaiian Dictionary: Hawaiian-English, English-Hawaiian. Honolulu: University of Hawaii Press. ISBN 978-0-8248-0703-0. OCLC 1005492788.
- Silva, Noenoe K. (1998a). "The 1897 Petitions Protesting Annexation". The Annexation Of Hawaii: A Collection Of Document. University of Hawaii at Manoa. Archived from the original on 2016-12-30.
- Silva, Noenoe K. (2004a). Aloha Betrayed: Native Hawaiian Resistance to American Colonialism. Durham: Duke University Press. ISBN 0-8223-8622-4. OCLC 191222123.
- Silva, Noenoe K. (2004b). "I Kū Mau Mau: How Kānaka Maoli Tried To Sustain National Identity Within the United States Political System". American Studies. 45 (3): 9–31. JSTOR 40643521.
- Silva, Noenoe K. (2017). The Power of the Steel-tipped Pen: Reconstructing Native Hawaiian Intellectual History. Durham: Duke University Press. ISBN 978-0-8223-7313-1. OCLC 961214024.
- Williams, Ronald Jr. (2015). "Race, Power, and the Dilemma of Democracy: Hawaiʻi's First Territorial Legislature, 1901". The Hawaiian Journal of History. 49. Honolulu: Hawaiian Historical Society: 1–45. doi:10.1353/hjh.2015.0017. hdl:10524/56604. OCLC 60626541.
