= Nawahi =

Nawahi may refer to:

- Joseph Nāwahī
- Emma ʻAima Nāwahī
- "King" Bennie Nawahi
- Nawahi (crater)
