= Hui Kālaiʻāina =

The Hui Kālaiʻāina (Hawaiian Political Association) was a political group founded in 1888 to oppose the 1887 Constitution of the Hawaiian Kingdom, often known as the Bayonet Constitution, and to promote Native Hawaiian leadership in the government. It and the two organizations of Hui Aloha ʻĀina were active in the opposition to the overthrow of the Hawaiian Kingdom and the annexation of Hawaii to the United States from 1893 to 1898.

== History ==
Hui Kālaiʻāina or the Hawaiian Political Association was founded on November 22, 1888, to oppose the 1887 Constitution of the Hawaiian Kingdom, often known as the Bayonet Constitution, and to promote Native Hawaiian leadership in the government. The organization elected as its first president John E. Bush, a former royal governor of Kauai and cabinet minister of King Kalākaua. American Daniel Lyons, who also later president of Hui Kālaiʻāina and was an active organizer for the group.

On the afternoon of January 14, 1893, after the prorogation of the legislative session, members of Hui Kālaiʻāina and a delegation of native leaders marched to ʻIolani Palace with a sealed package containing a newly drafted constitution. At the head of the procession was John W. Alapai, head deacon of Kaumakapili Church and president of Hui Kālaiʻāina. He led the procession of members of the organization, marching two by two, with John Akina holding the sealed constitution. According to William DeWitt Alexander, this was pre-planned by the queen to take place while she met with her newly appointed cabinet ministers in the Blue Room of the palace. She was attempting to promulgate the constitution during the recess of the legislative assembly. However, these ministers, including Samuel Parker, William H. Cornwell, John F. Colburn, and Arthur P. Peterson, were either opposed to or reluctant to support the new constitution.

These actions and the radicalized political climate eventually led to the overthrow of the monarchy, on January 17, 1893, by the Committee of Safety, with the covert support of United States Minister John L. Stevens and the landing of American forces from the USS Boston. After a brief transition under the Provisional Government, the oligarchical Republic of Hawaii was established on July 4, 1894, with Sanford B. Dole as president. During this period, the de facto government, which was composed largely of residents of American and European ancestry, sought to annex the islands to the United States against the wishes of the Native Hawaiians who wanted to remain an independent nation ruled by the monarchy.

In anticipation of a new vote on an annexation treaty supported by President William McKinley, Hui Kālaiʻāina and other Hawaiian nationalist groups collected petitions to oppose the treaty's ratification in the United States Senate in 1897. Members of Kālaiʻāina collected 17,000 signatures opposing annexation and asking for the restoration of Queen Liliʻuokalani while Hui Aloha ʻĀina collected over 21,000 signatures across the island chain opposing annexation. The petitions were presented by a commission of Native Hawaiian delegates consisting of James Keauiluna Kaulia, (president of Hui Aloha ʻĀina), David Kalauokalani (president of Hui Kālaiʻāina), William Auld, and John Richardson to the United States government. It was decided last minute not to submit the signatures by Hui Kālaiʻāina because it asked for the restoration of the monarchy and the delegations wanted to provide a united message to the United States and did not want to be seen as politically divided. Instead, Kalauokalani endorsed the signatures by Hui Aloha ʻĀina to provide a stronger message. The petitions collectively were presented as evidence of the strong grassroots opposition of the Hawaiian community to annexation, and the treaty was defeated in the Senate.

However, a year following the defeat of the treaty in the Senate, Hawaii was annexed via the Newlands Resolution, a joint resolution of Congress, in July 1898. This was done shortly after the outbreak of the Spanish–American War and necessitated by the strategic position of Hawaii as a Pacific military base.

To no avail, Hui Kālaiʻāina continued to attempt to undo the annexation of Hawaii to the United States and restore a Native Hawaiian-led government.

The organization participated in the funeral processions of Princess Kaʻiulani and Queen Kapiʻolani in 1899 and was referred to as Ahahui Kalaiaina in the published funerary procession in the local newspapers.

== Dissolution and legacy ==
The organization merged with Hui Aloha ʻĀina to form the Hawaiian Home Rule Party in 1900. Kalauokalani was elected president and Kaulia as vice-president of the new political party.

In 1996, historian Noenoe K. Silva discovered the 21,269 signatures of the Kūʻē Petitions by Hui Aloha ʻĀina in the National Archives in Washington, DC, but the whereabout of the original Hui Kālaiʻāina petition remains unknown.

== See also ==
- Opposition to the overthrow of the Hawaiian Kingdom

== Bibliography ==
- Alexander, William DeWitt (1896). History of Later Years of the Hawaiian Monarchy and the Revolution of 1893. Honolulu: Hawaiian Gazette Company. OCLC 11843616.
- Allen, Helena G. (1982). The Betrayal of Liliuokalani: Last Queen of Hawaii, 1838–1917. Glendale, CA: A. H. Clark Company. ISBN 978-0-87062-144-4. OCLC 9576325.
- Blount, James Henderson (1895). The Executive Documents of the House of Representatives for the Third Session of the Fifty-Third Congress, 1893–'94 in Thirty-Five Volumes. Washington, DC: U.S. Government Printing Office. OCLC 191710879.
- Haley, James L. (2014). Captive Paradise: A History of Hawaii. New York: St. Martin's Press. ISBN 978-0-312-60065-5. OCLC 865158092.
- Kam, Ralph Thomas (2017). Death Rites and Hawaiian Royalty: Funerary Practices in the Kamehameha and Kalakaua Dynasties, 1819–1953. S. I.: McFarland, Incorporated, Publishers. ISBN 978-1-4766-6846-8. OCLC 966566652.
- Kuykendall, Ralph Simpson (1967). The Hawaiian Kingdom 1874–1893, The Kalakaua Dynasty. Vol. 3. Honolulu: University of Hawaii Press. ISBN 978-0-87022-433-1. OCLC 500374815.
- Liliuokalani (1898). Hawaii's Story by Hawaii's Queen, Liliuokalani. Boston: Lee and Shepard. ISBN 978-0-548-22265-2. OCLC 2387226.
- Loomis, Albertine (1963). "The Longest Legislature" (PDF). Seventy-First Annual Report of the Hawaiian Historical Society for the Year 1962. 71. Honolulu: Hawaiian Historical Society: 7–27. hdl:10524/35.
- Mehmed, Ali (1998). "Hoʻohuiʻaina Pala Ka Maiʻa: Remembering Annexation One Hundred Years Ago". The Hawaiian Journal of History. 32. Honolulu: Hawaiian Historical Society: 141–154. hdl:10524/358. OCLC 60626541.
- Morris, Nancy J.; Benedetto, Robert (2019). Nā Kahu: Portraits of Native Hawaiian Pastors at Home and Abroad, 1820–1900. Honolulu: University of Hawaii Press. ISBN 978-0-8248-7777-4. OCLC 1098290393.
- Silva, Noenoe K. (2004). Aloha Betrayed: Native Hawaiian Resistance to American Colonialism. Durham: Duke University Press. ISBN 0-8223-8622-4. OCLC 191222123.
- Twigg-Smith, Thurston (1998). Hawaiian Sovereignty: Do the Facts Matter?. Honolulu: Goodale Publishing. ISBN 978-0-9662945-0-7. OCLC 39090004.
- Williams, Ronald Jr. (2015). "Race, Power, and the Dilemma of Democracy: Hawaiʻi's First Territorial Legislature, 1901". The Hawaiian Journal of History. 49. Honolulu: Hawaiian Historical Society: 1–45. doi:10.1353/hjh.2015.0017. hdl:10524/56604. OCLC 60626541 – via Project MUSE.
