= Moʻolelo =

Narratives of the Native Hawaiian people

Moʻolelo are the narrative stories of the Native Hawaiian people. These fiction and nonfiction narratives were exclusively oral at first, but began to be disseminated through writing in the 1800s after the development of the written Hawaiian language. The 1896 ban on Hawaiian language instruction in schools prevented several generations of Native Hawaiians from reading moʻolelo that were not translated into English.

== Etymology ==
The word moʻolelo is a compound, formed from moʻo (a series or succession) and ʻōlelo (spoken language). Moʻolelo thus means "a succession of spoken language", as the Hawaiian language was originally oral. However, the term can also refer to written narratives.

== Characteristics ==
There are various traditional genres of moʻolelo, as well as contemporary moʻolelo written in nontraditional genres. Features of traditional moʻolelo include kaona (a Hawaiian rhetorical device involving allusion, puns, and metaphor, translated as "underlying meaning") and the use of cultural imagery such as kalo. Mo'olelo can be both fictional and nonfictional narratives; the term moʻolelo haku wale refers specifically to a fictional story, while kaʻao refers to a fictionalized story that may still be true. All moʻolelo are set in specific and identifiable locations.

== History ==
=== Before Western contact ===
Before Western contact, moʻolelo were passed down through oral storytelling (including song and chant) and hula. Some epics took multiple days to tell in full.

=== After Western contact ===
In the 1800s, moʻolelo that affirmed the history and spiritual power of the Hawaiian Islands became popular as a response to the Western narrative of Hawaii as a place of spiritual darkness.

In the 1820s, white missionaries developed a system of written Hawaiian that used the Latin alphabet. This system was used by the native Hawaiians to preserve more oral literature in native-language writing than almost any other colonized indigenous people. Moʻolelo were written down and published in Hawaiian-language newspapers such as Ke Kumu Hawaii and Ka Nonanona as literacy in the written Hawaiian language became widespread.

In the 1860s, 1870s, and 1880s, there was a concerted effort to write down and preserve aspects of Hawaiian tradition including moʻolelo.

In 1896, three years after the overthrow of the Hawaiian Kingdom, the use of the Hawaiian language for instruction in schools was banned. This caused several generations of Native Hawaiians to grow up without knowledge of the language, making them unable to read moʻolelo that had not been translated into English.

== See also ==
- Fagogo

== Bibliography ==
- hoʻomanawanui, kuʻualoha (2004). "Hä, Mana, Leo (Breath, Spirit, Voice): Kanaka Maoli Empowerment through Literature". American Indian Quarterly. 28 (1/2). University of Nebraska Press: 86–91. doi:10.1353/aiq.2005.0011. ISSN 0095-182X. JSTOR 4139042. S2CID 162350145.
- Kuwada, Bryan Kamaoli (2009). "To Translate or Not To Translate: Revising the Translating of Hawaiian Language Texts". Biography. 32 (1). University of Hawaii Press: 54–65. ISSN 0162-4962. JSTOR 23540868.
- Silva, Noenoe K. (2009). "Nā Hulu Kupuna: To Honor our Intellectual Ancestors". Biography. 32 (1). University of Hawaii Press: 43–53. ISSN 0162-4962. JSTOR 23540867.
- McDougall, Brandy Nālani; Nordstrom, Georganne (September 2011). "Ma ka Hana ka 'Ike (In the Work Is the Knowledge): Kaona as Rhetorical Action". College Composition and Communication. 63 (1). National Council of Teachers of English: 98–121. ISSN 0010-096X. JSTOR 23006899.
- Chang, David A. (2016). The World and All the Things upon It: Native Hawaiian Geographies of Exploration. University of Minnesota Press. ISBN 978-0-8166-9942-1. JSTOR 10.5749/j.ctt1c2crj3.
- Goodyear-Ka'ōpua, Noelani; Kuwada, Bryan Kamaoli (2018). "Making 'Aha: Independent Hawaiian Pasts, Presents & Futures". Daedalus. 147 (2): 49–59. doi:10.1162/DAED_a_00489. ISSN 0011-5266.
- Pukui, Mary Kawena (1986). Hawaiian Dictionary: Hawaiian-English, English-Hawaiian. Samuel H. Elbert (Rev. and enl. ed.). Honolulu, Hawaii: University of Hawaii Press. ISBN 978-0-8248-0703-0. OCLC 12751521.
- Hopkins, J. Uluwehi (2019). "Moʻolelo as Resistance: The Kaona of "Kahalaopuna" in a Colonized Environment". Narrative Culture. 6 (2): 229–259. doi:10.13110/narrcult.6.2.0229. ISSN 2169-0251. S2CID 199222264.
