= Blount, Georgia =

Unincorporated community in Georgia, U.S.

Coordinates: 33°10′49″N 83°57′34″W

Blount is an unincorporated community in Monroe County, in the U.S. state of Georgia.

== History ==
The community was named after James Henderson Blount (1837–1903), U.S. congressman from Georgia. A post office called Blount was established in 1887, and remained in operation until 1906. In 1900, the community had 57 inhabitants.
