= Kuʻualoha hoʻomanawanui =

Native Hawaiian English professor

kuʻualoha hoʻomanawanui is a Native Hawaiian author who is known for her scholarship on Pele.

== Early life and education ==
Born in Kailua, Oʻahu, hoʻomanawanui also spent part of her childhood on Kauaʻi at Wailua Homesteads. Attending the University of Hawaiʻi at Mānoa as an undergraduate, hoʻomanawanui earned her B.A. in Hawaiian Studies, an M.A. in Polynesian Religion, and PhD in English literature at the university. While in graduate school, hoʻomanawanui was a founding editor of ʻŌiwi: A Native Hawaiian Journal. She became the chief editor after the passing of Mahealani Dudoit.

== Career ==
hoʻomanawanui has been a full professor with the University of Hawaiʻi at Mānoa since 2007, teaching Native Hawaiian literature and Pacific (Oceanic) literature. Her focus is on moʻolelo, especially the legends of the Hawaiian goddess Pele. hoʻomanawanui is the first Native Hawaiian with a tenure track position in the Department of English at the University of Hawaiʻi. Her work received an honorable mention for the Modern Language Association Prize for Studies in Native American Literatures, Cultures, and Languages.

== Bibliography ==
- hoʻomanawanui, kuʻualoha (2014). Voices of fire : reweaving the literary lei of Pele and Hi'iaka. Minneapolis. ISBN 978-1-4529-4120-2. OCLC 881732359.
