= Nāwahī (crater) =

Crater on Mercury

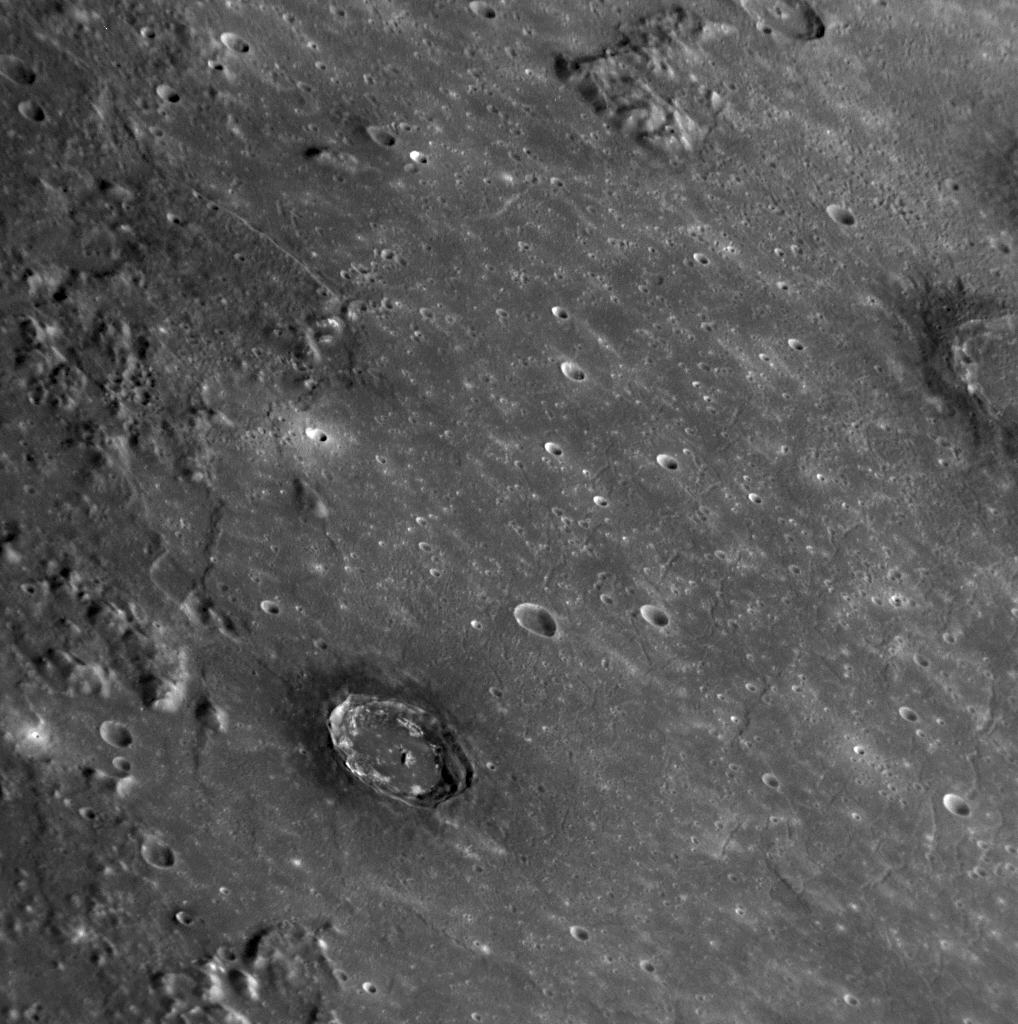
- Nāwahī is in lower left of this MESSENGER image. The rugged terrain to the left it is part of the Caloris basin rim. A portion of Munch is visible to the right.
- Feature type: Impact crater
- Location: Raditladi quadrangle, Mercury
- Coordinates: 36.1°N 214.9°W
- Diameter: 34 km (21 mi)
- Eponym: Joseph Nāwahī

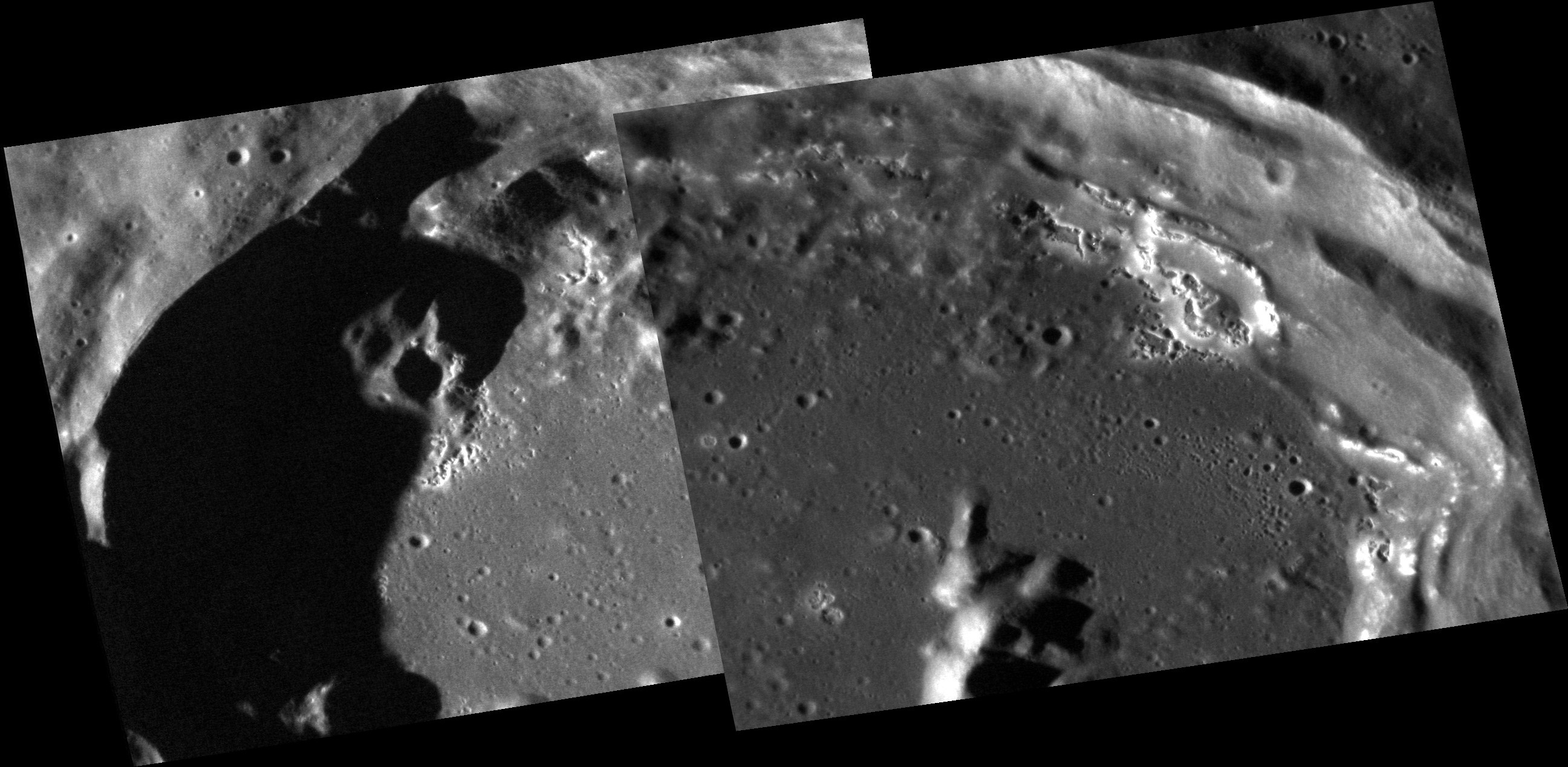
Detail of Nāwahī crater interior showing hollows

Nāwahī is a crater on Mercury. Nāwahī crater is located within the large Caloris basin, near the western rim. The unusual dark material creating a halo around Nāwahī makes this crater of special interest, as the dark material likely represents rocks with a different chemical and mineralogical composition than those of the neighboring surface. The crater is named after Hawaiian patriot and painter Joseph Nāwahī.

Hollows are present in Nāwahī, mostly along the terraces of the crater rim. A confirmed dark spot is present in Nāwahī. This dark spot is associated with the hollows.
