= Kūʻē Petitions =

1897 protest action in Hawaii

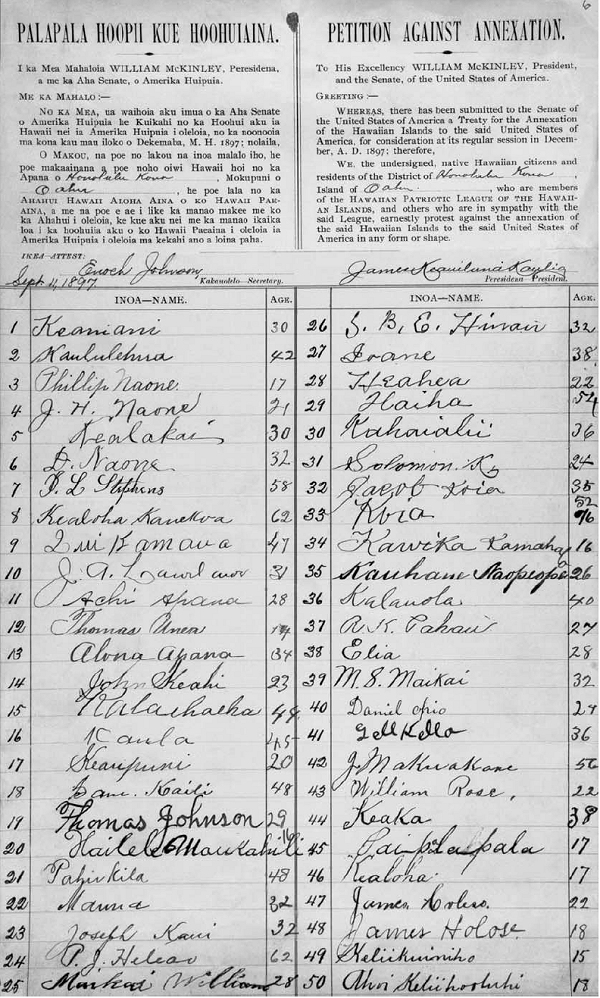
The Kūʻē Petitions

The Kūʻē (Hawaiian: "opposition") Petitions of 1897 were a protest against the annexation of Hawaii by the United States. Also referred to as the "monster petition". It was organized by Hui Aloha ʻĀina.

== History ==
The majority of the population of the Hawaiian Kingdom in the late 1890s was vociferously opposed to annexation. In a single weeklong petition drive in 1897, 21,269 signatures — representing well over half of the native adult population of Hawaii at the time — were procured by horseback, boat and foot travel by members of Hui Aloha ʻĀina (Hawaiian Patriotic League). Names on the petition were from loyal subjects of the Hawaiian Kingdom many of which were Asian because of the Chinese Exclusion Act of 1882 that threatened the voting rights of the Asian population in the Hawaiian Kingdom. These petitions were hand-carried to Washington and delivered to the United States Senate by a commission of Native Hawaiian delegates consisting of James Keauiluna Kaulia (president of Hui Aloha ʻĀina), David Kalauokalani (president of Hui Kālaiʻāina), William Auld, and John Richardson.

== Text ==
The text of the petitions is as follows:

"To his Excellency WILLIAM McKINLEY, President, and the Senate, of the United States of America. Greeting - Whereas there has been submitted to the Senate of the United States of America a treaty for the Annexation of the Hawaiian Islands to the said United States of America, for consideration at its regular session in December A.D. 1897; therefore,

We the undersigned, native Hawaiian citizens and residents of the district of.............Island of.........who are members of the Women's Hawaiian Patriotic League of the Hawaiian Islands, and others who are in sympathy with the said league, earnestly protest against the annexation of the said Hawaiian Islands to the United States of America in any form or shape."

== Effect ==
After receiving the petitions, the United States Senate in 1898 failed to approve the annexation treaty by the necessary two-thirds majority. Annexation was then effected under the Newlands Resolution.

== See also ==
- History of Hawaii
- Opposition to the overthrow of the Kingdom of Hawaii
