= Mahealani Dudoit =

Native Hawaiian writer and activist (1954–2002)

Darlaine Māhealani MuiLan Dudoit (1954 – August 28, 2002) was a Hawaiian poet, essayist and editor. Her work appeared in the literary journals Manoa, the Hawaii Review, and The Southwest Review, as well as the anthologies Sister Stew, Growing Up Local, and Against Extinction.

Dudoit founded the literary journal Oiwi: A Native Hawaiian Journal in 1999 and served as its first editor. According to her successor, Ku'ualoha Ho'omanawanui, "Mahealani knew how difficult it was for Hawaiian writers to get published in other venues for various reasons. Oiwi was created as a place where Hawaiian literary voices could be heard, nurtured, appreciated."

She received the Ernest Hemingway Memorial Award for Poetry in 1989, the Elliot Cades Award for Literature in 1999, and a John Dominis Holt Fellowship in 2002.

Dudoit was found dead in a Kaneohe hotel on August 28, 2002, along with her husband Sanford Kapana. The Honolulu police department ruled her death a suicide. This conclusion was disputed by the medical examiner's office, citing inconclusive autopsy results, a lack of motive, and a restraining order that she had filed against her husband.

== Bibliography ==
- Recurrent Dreams (1992)
- Voyages of Return: Essays of Hawaiian Cultural Rediscovery (1996)

== See also ==
- Eric Chock
- Ian MacMillan
