= Noenoe Silva =

American historian

- Born: October 19, 1954 (age 71); Oʻahu, Hawaiʻi

Academic background
- Education: University of Hawaiʻi at Mānoa

Academic work
- Main interests: Kanaka Maoli history, Hawaiian language texts, Kanaka Maoli theory
- Notable works: Aloha Betrayed: Native Hawaiian Resistance to American Colonialism
- Website: https://politicalscience.manoa.hawaii.edu/noenoe-silva/

Noenoe K. Silva (born October 19, 1954) is a Hawaiian author and scholar. A professor of political science at the University of Hawaiʻi at Mānoa, her work has appeared in Biography, American Studies, and The Contemporary Pacific.

== Life ==
Silva was born on Oʻahu and is of Kanaka Maoli descent. She returned to Hawaiʻi in 1985 after growing up in California. In 1991, she earned a bachelor's in Hawaiian language. In 1993, she completed a master's degree in Library and Information Studies, and in 1999 earned a PhD in political science.

== Work ==
While still a doctoral candidate, Silva was instrumental in rediscovering the Kūʻē Petitions, which had been presented to the United States government in 1897 in an attempt to halt American annexation of Hawaii. The petitions formed part of the basis for her book Aloha Betrayed: Native Hawaiian Resistance to American Colonialism, an examination of Hawaiian language accounts of the overthrow of the Hawaiian Kingdom.

In 2006, Silva received a Katrin H. Lamon Fellowship from the School for Advanced Research to continue her research along similar lines through building a database of Hawaiian authors.

Silva also contributed to A Dictionary of the Hawaiian Language, an updated reprint of the first Hawaiian-English dictionary prepared by Lorrin Andrews in 1865, which was published by Island Heritage in 2003.

== Awards ==
Aloha Betrayed received the Kenneth W. Baldridge Prize from Brigham Young University–Hawaii.

== Bibliography ==
- The 1897 Petitions Protesting Annexation (1998) (as editor)
- Aloha Betrayed: Native Hawaiian Resistance to American Colonialism (2004)
- The Power of the Steel-Tipped Pen: Reconstructing Native Hawaiian Intellectual History (2017)

== See also ==
- Hawaiian sovereignty movement
