= James Henderson Blount =

American politician (1937–1903)

James Blount
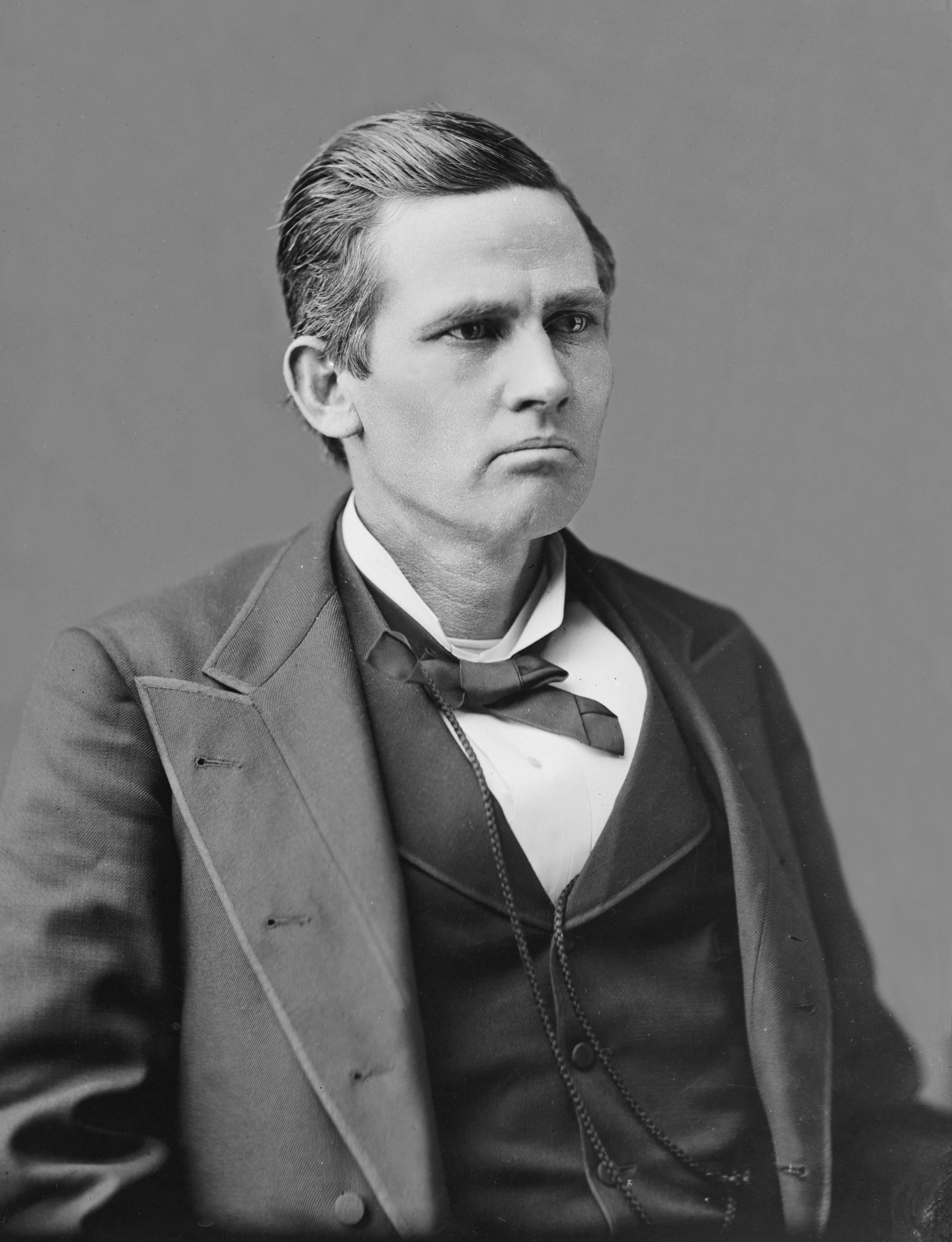
- Blount c. 1873

Member of the U.S. House of Representatives from Georgia's 6th district
- In office March 4, 1873 – March 3, 1893
- Preceded by: William P. Price
- Succeeded by: Thomas B. Cabaniss

Personal details
- Born: September 12, 1837 Georgia, United States
- Died: March 8, 1903 (aged 65) Macon, Georgia, United States
- Party: Democratic
- Children: Dorothy
- Education: University of Georgia
- Occupation: Lawyer

Military service
- Allegiance: Confederate States
- Branch/service: Confederate States Army; United States Army
- Years of service: 4 years

James Henderson Blount (September 12, 1837 – March 8, 1903) was an American politician, Confederate army soldier and congressman from Georgia. He opposed the annexation of Hawaii in 1893 in his investigation into the American involvement in the political revolution in the Kingdom of Hawai'i.

== Early life ==
Blount was born near Clinton, Jones County, Georgia. He attended private schools there and in Tuscaloosa, Alabama. He graduated from the University of Georgia at Athens in 1858. He studied law and was admitted to the Georgia bar in 1859. During the American Civil War he served in the Confederate States Army as a private in the Second Georgia Battalion, Floyd Rifles for two years, and was later lieutenant colonel for two years.

== Political career ==
Blount served in the United States Congress representing the sixth district of Georgia from 1873 to 1893. He was part of the faction of Southern Democrats known as the Redeemers. He was Chairman of the House Committee on Foreign Relations (1891–1893).

== Hawai'i ==
After a coup overthrew Queen Lili'uokalani of Hawai'i in January 1893, the new government sought to be annexed by the United States. President Benjamin Harrison was supportive and sent a treaty to the Senate. His successor, President Grover Cleveland, a Democrat, opposed annexation and sent Blount, now a private citizen, to investigate. The report he issued on July 17, 1893 is known as the Blount Report.

Blount recommended the rejection of annexation and stated that the natives should be allowed to continue their ways. When Blount blamed the U.S. consul for providing assistance for the overthrow, Cleveland proposed to use American military force to overthrow the new government by force and reinstall Liliʻuokalani as an absolute monarch. When the deposed Queen refused to grant amnesty as a condition of her reinstatement, she was accused of telling an American official she would "behead" the current government leaders and confiscate their property, Cleveland referred the matter to Congress.

The U.S. Senate, under Democratic control but angered at being shut out of a major foreign policy issue by Cleveland, then produced its own report, written by Senator John Morgan, a Democrat, and known as the Morgan Report. It completely contradicted Blount's findings and found the revolution in Hawaii was a completely internal affair. Following the Turpie Resolution of May 1894, which vowed a policy of non-interference in Hawaiian affairs, Cleveland dropped all talk of reinstating the Queen and went on to officially recognize and maintain diplomatic relations with the Republic of Hawaii. Other nations had already recognized the Republic. In 1898, the Republic again sought annexation, which with McKinley's strong support won Congressional approval.

== Death ==
Blount died at the age of 65 in Macon, Bibb County, Georgia, and was buried at the Rose Hill Cemetery in Macon, Georgia.

He is the namesake to the community of Blount, Georgia.

== Notes ==
U.S. House of Representatives
Preceded by William P. Price	Member of the U.S. House of Representatives from Georgia's 6th congressional district March 4, 1873 – March 3, 1893	Succeeded by Thomas B. Cabaniss
Diplomatic posts
Preceded by John L. Stevens	United States Minister to Hawaii; 1893	Succeeded by Albert Sydney Willis
