= Bill White =

Bill White may refer to:

== Politics and law ==
- Bill White (administrator) (born 1960s), ambassador of the USA to Belgium since 2025
- Bill White (Canadian politician) (1915–1981), composer and social activist, first Black Canadian to run for political office
- Bill White (lawyer) (born 1945), American lawyer who served as Public Defender for Florida's Fourth Judicial Circuit, 2004–2008
- Bill White (Missouri politician) (born 1953), American politician
- Bill White (Texas politician) (born 1954), former mayor of Houston, Texas, and candidate for the Texas gubernatorial election, 2010

== Sports ==
=== Baseball ===
- Bill White (first baseman) (born 1934), American baseball player, sportscaster and executive
- Bill White (pitcher) (born 1978), American baseball pitcher
- Bill White (shortstop) (1860–1924), Major League Baseball shortstop with the Pittsburgh Pirates

=== Other sports ===
- Bill White (Australian footballer) (1916–1990), Australian rules footballer with Richmond
- Bill White (basketball, born 1936) (1936–1999), American college basketball coach
- Bill White (bobsleigh) (born 1959), American Olympic bobsledder
- Bill White (footballer, born 1877) (1877–1960), Scottish association football player
- Bill White (footballer, born 1907), Scottish association football player
- Bill White (ice hockey) (1939–2017), Canadian ice hockey player and coach
- Bill White (rugby union, born 1910) (1910–1977), Australian rugby union player
- Bill White (rugby union, born 1913) (1913–1969), Australian rugby union player
- Bill White (wrestler) (1945–2021), American wrestler

== Other ==
- Bill White (comics) (1961–2012), American comic book creator and animator
- Bill White (neo-Nazi) (born 1977), American neo-Nazi activist
- Bill White (administrator) (born 1960s), President of the Intrepid Sea-Air-Space Museum and Intrepid Fallen Heroes Fund
- "Country" Bill White (c. 1934–2006), American burial artist
- Bill White, bassist with American rock band The Amboy Dukes
- Bill White (restaurateur), an American restaurateur who owns many restaurants in Park City, Utah

== See also ==
- Billy White (disambiguation)
- William White (disambiguation)
- Willie White (disambiguation)
- Bill Wight (1922–2007), American baseball pitcher
- Will White (1854–1911), American baseball player
