= 1886 Hawaiian legislative election =

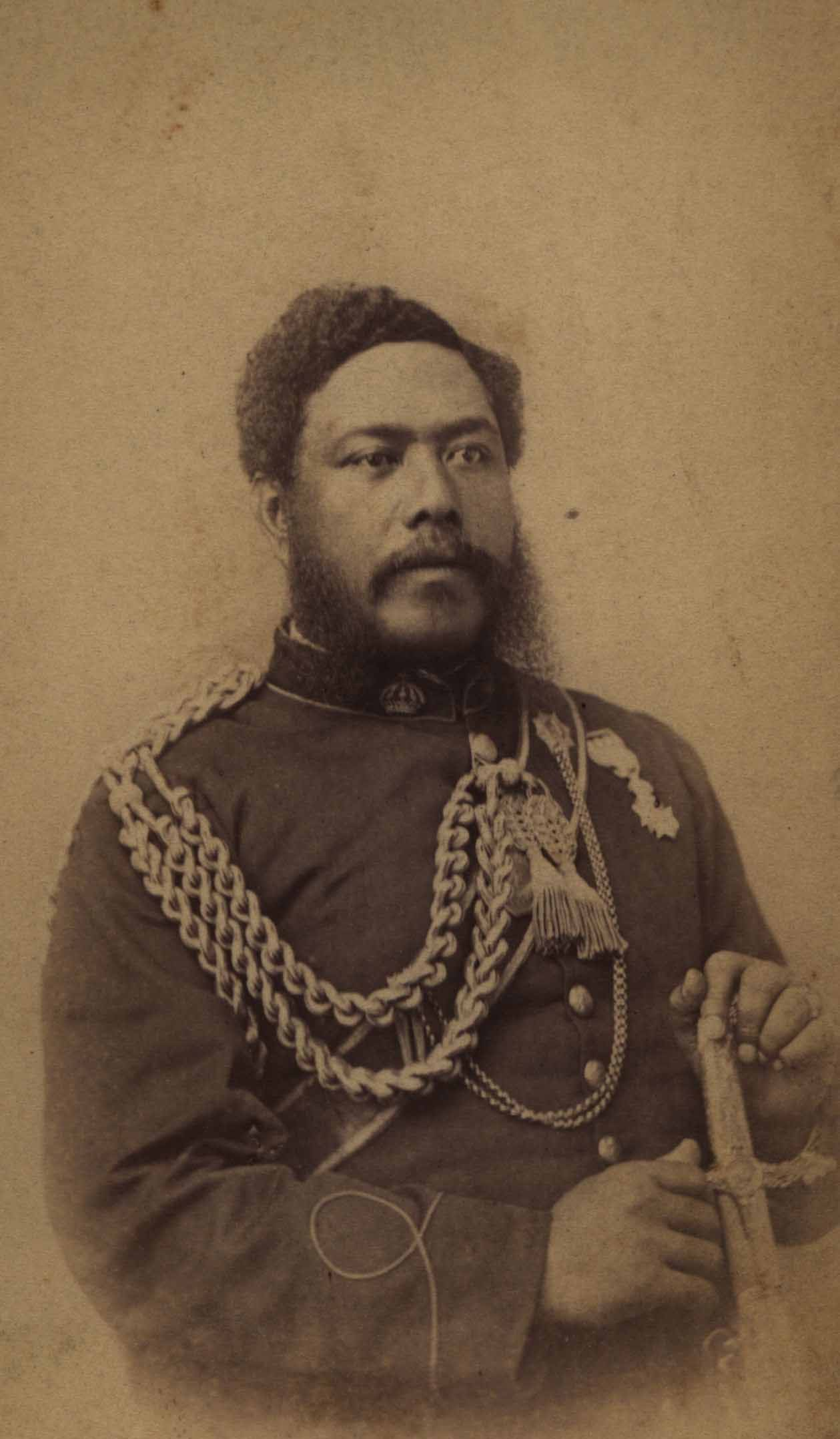
King Kalākaua, King of the Hawaiian Islands in 1886 and a leader of the National Party

Legislative elections were held in the Kingdom of Hawaiʻi in 1886 to determine the composition of the 28-member House of Representatives. During the elections the National Party and Independent (Kūʻokoʻa) Party bitterly campaigned for control of the House of Representatives. Despite their efforts, the Independents once again lost to Premier Walter M. Gibson's National Party.

== Background ==
In 1882 the popular member of the Hawaiian House of Representatives Walter M. Gibson was appointed Premier of the Hawaiian Kingdom by King Kalākaua. Walter Murray Gibson quickly became Kalākaua's "Minister of Everything" and set much of Hawaiʻi's domestic and foreign policy until 1887. Much of the Gibson's administration's agenda was based around keeping the Hawaiian government in control of indigenous Hawaiians and setting up a united Polynesian confederation with Hawaiʻi at its center. Supporters of the King and Premier Gibson rallied behind the National Party.

However, since the elections of 1884 opposition to Gibson's administration existed in the form of the Independent Party, led by wealthy American planters like Lorrin A. Thurston, Sanford B. Dole, and William R. Castle, with a few Native Hawaiian politicians who also opposed Gibson. In 1885, leaders of the Independents would meet in Honolulu, where they unanimously voted to run for election in 1886. This was the first meeting of the infamous Committee of 13 that would come to overthrow the Kingdom of Hawaiʻi.

National Party and Independent candidates fought hard and toured the islands of Maui, Molokaʻi, and Hawaiʻi. National Party candidates painted the Independents and disgruntled foreign businessmen who planned to take over the Kingdom while Independents accused Government candidates of corruption, voting fraud, and handing over the kingdom to wealthy California capitalists.

== Results ==
Despite the heavy campaigning, the Independents ended up losing seats overall from the 1884. Kuykendall attributes the victory to dubious voting practices on the hands of the King while Moblo points out that fear rose from the Native Hawaiian community that the Independents wanted to undermine Hawaiian control of government and the King, especially from the Committee of Thirteen, making Hawaiians hesitant to vote Independent.

Party	Seats	+/–
National Party	18	+3
Independent (Kūʻokoʻa) Party	10	–3
Total	28	0
Source: Kuykendall

== Aftermath ==
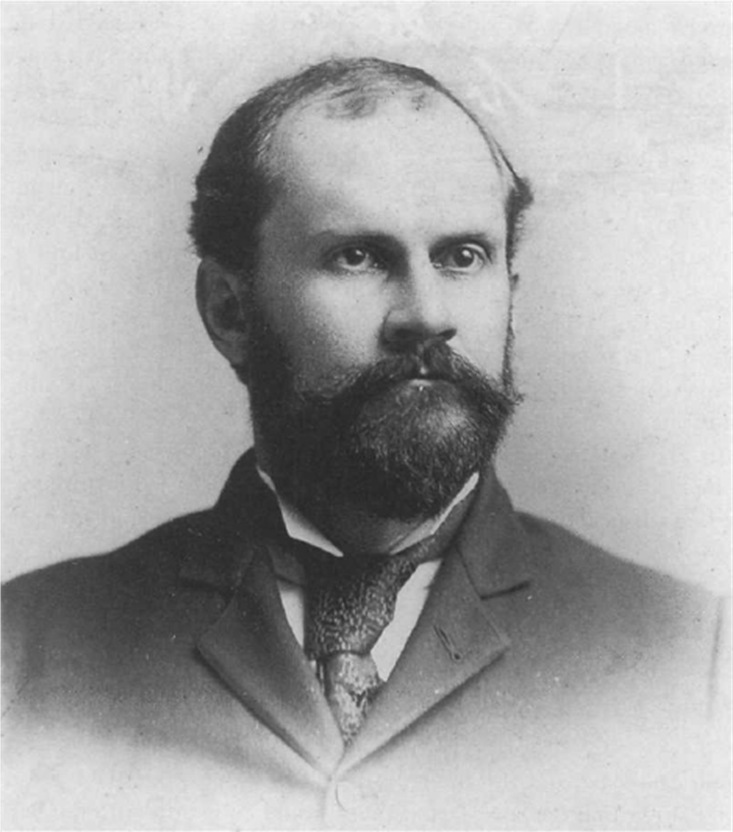
L. A. Thurson, leader of the Committee of 13 and central to the overthrow of the King's government in 1887

The Gibson and Kalākaua administration took the results of the election as a popular affirmation to their administration. In 1887, the Gibson administration purchased the tradership Kaimiloa and sent representatives to Sāmoa to negotiate the possible confederation between the two states, angering many Independent representatives and planters who saw the whole endeavor as a waste of resources. After their electoral defeat and the Sāmoa mission, the Committee of Thirteen would plot the illegal seizure of the King's government. In 1887 with the armed support of the Honolulu Rifles, they would present themselves to the King as his "Reform Cabinet", arrested Gibson and other Government Party ministers, and forced him to sign the Bayonet Constitution, known so because the Committee of Thirteen held the King at gunpoint to coerce him to sign it. The new constitution disenfranchised Asian subjects, empowered wealthy White foreigners, limited Native Hawaiian voting rights, and striped the King of much of his power. In fact, there was even plans to overthrow the monarchy entirely and establish a Hawaiian Republic with the intent to get annexed by the United States in L. A. Thurston's files, but these did not yet come to fruition.
