= Albert Kūnuiākea =

Hawaiian politician (1851–1903)

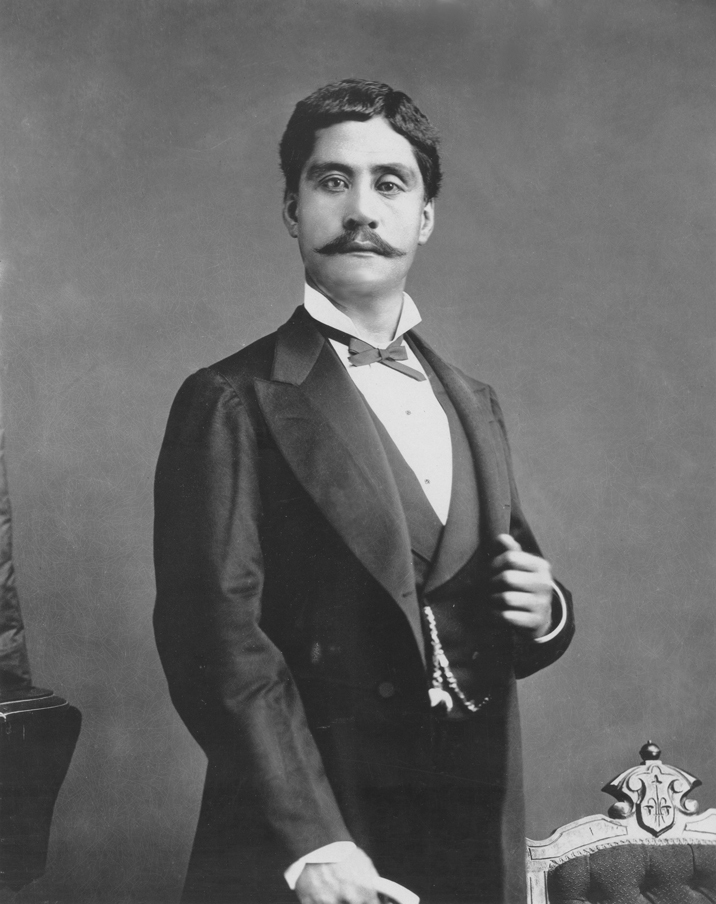
- Born: June 19, 1851; Kuaihelani, Honolulu, Oʻahu, Kingdom of Hawaii
- Died: March 10, 1903 (aged 51); Honolulu, Oʻahu, Territory of Hawaii
- Burial: March 15, 1903; Mauna ʻAla Royal Mausoleum
- Spouse: Mary Lonokahikini
Names
- Albert Kūkaʻilimoku Kūnuiākea; Albert Fredrick Kunuiakea Oiwiaulani Koenaokalani
- House: House of Kamehameha
- Father: Kamehameha III
- Mother: Jane Lahilahi; Queen Kalama (hānai)

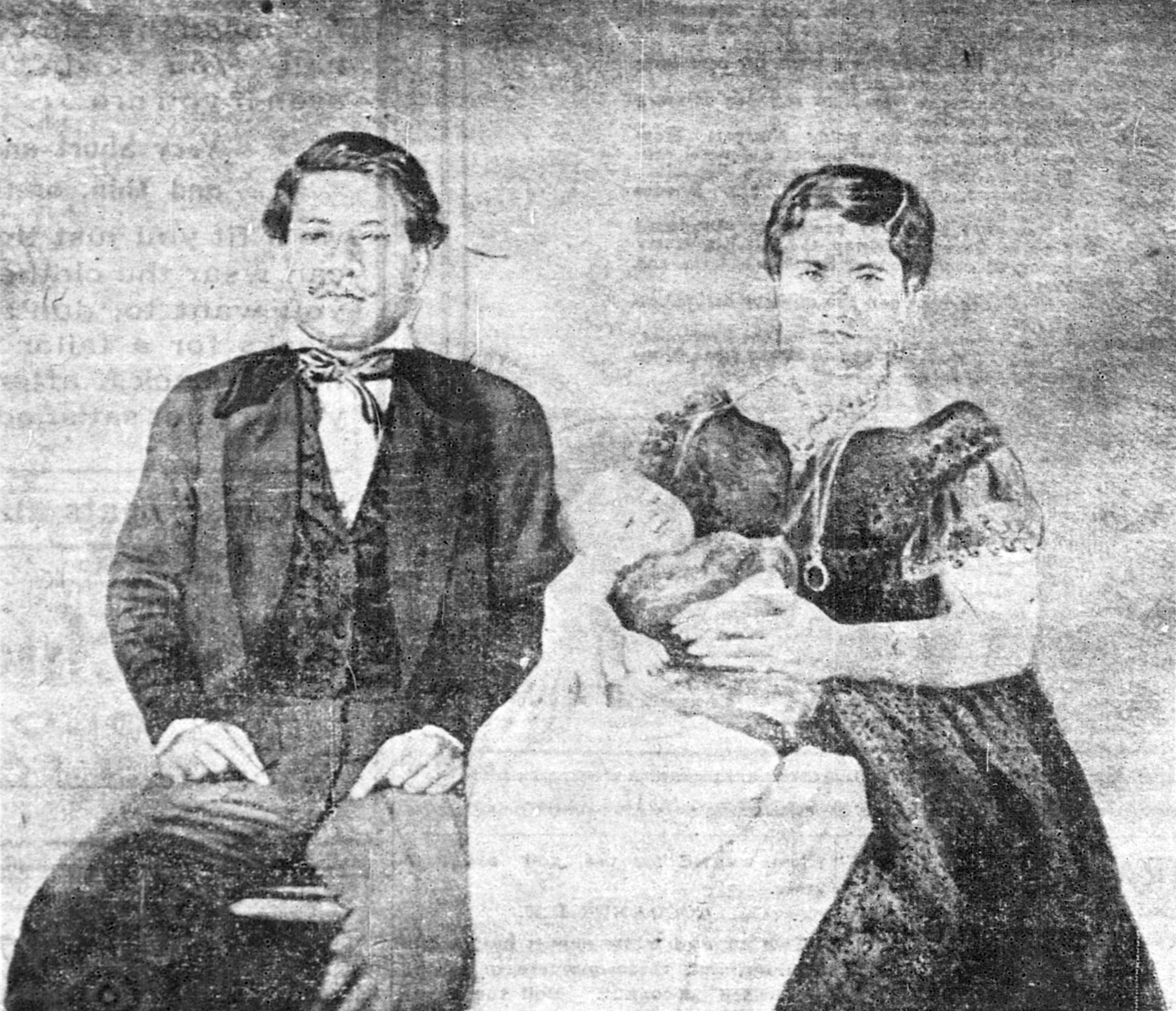
Kamehameha III and Queen Kalama with Albert Kūnuiākea

Albert Kūkaʻilimoku Kūnuiākea (June 19, 1851 – March 10, 1903) was the illegitimate son of King Kamehameha III and his mistress Jane Lahilahi. He served as a politician in the Kingdom of Hawaii and the Republic of Hawaii. He later was baptized into the Anglican Church of Hawaii with the name Albert Fredrick Kunuiakea Oiwiaulani Koenaokalani.

== Early life and family ==
Kūnuiākea was born on June 19, 1851, at his mother's residence at Kuaihelani, on Beretania Street, Honolulu, where the Central Union Church now stands. He and his twin brother were born to King Kamehameha III and his mistress Jane Lahilahi. (Note: Robert William Wilcox would later claim he was a descendant from Kalikoolani and “Keaka, a cast-off Tahitian chief of an infinitesimally low rank”.) Lahilahi was married to Joshua Kaʻeo by whom she had a son named Peter Kaʻeo, his older half-brother. From his mother's family, he was the grandson of John Young, the British advisor of Kamehameha I, and Kaʻōanaʻeha, the daughter of Kamehameha I's brother Keliʻimaikaʻi. In the Hawaiian language, his name Kūnuiākea means "Kū the Supreme One" while his second name Kūkaʻilimoku means "Kū the Snatcher of Land" and honor the war god Kū, the patron deity of his grandfather King Kamehameha I who conquered and unified the Kingdom of Hawaii in 1810.

Sources are disputed on the name and exact fate of his twin brother. Under the name Kīwalaʻō, it was claimed he was taken by Kamehameha III and his wife Queen Kalama to raise while Kūnuiākea was brought back to his maternal family to be reared. The Hawaiian custom of hānai is an informal form of adoption between extended families practiced by Hawaiian royals and commoners alike. Other genealogy of the Young family name a son by Lahilahi and Kaʻeo called Alebada Keliʻimaikaʻi. He was adopted by their maternal uncle James Kānehoa and died on October 13, 1851. This may or may not be the same person as Kīwalaʻō. When this brother died as an infant, Kūnuiākea was hānai (adopted) to the royal couple and raised at the Royal Palace.

== Succession to the throne ==
Kamehameha III died in 1854 and was succeeded by his nephew and adopted heir Alexander Liholiho as Kamehameha IV. Kūnuiākea was not eligible for the throne since the Hawaiian constitution only permitted succession through legitimate lines. Later, non-contemporary sources claimed Kamehameha III wanted Kūnuiākea in the succession. According to an 1883 publication of the Hawaiian newspaper Ka Nupepa Kuokoa, Kamehameha III wanted to make Kūnuiākea his second heir after Alexander Liholiho. However, Kūnuiākea's maternal uncle Keoni Ana, who was Minister of the Interior and the Kuhina Nui (premier or co-ruler), opposed this plan and insisted that Alexander Liholiho be followed by Lot Kapuāiwa. Keoni Ana's opposition stopped Kamehameha III's plan.

== Adulthood ==
In 1862, he was baptized Albert Fredrick Kunuiakea Oiwiaulani Koenaokalani into the newly established Anglican Church of Hawaii founded by his cousin Queen Emma and her husband Kamehameha IV.

Kūnuiākea was betrothed to Miriam Likelike, the younger sister of King Kalākaua and Queen Liliʻuokalani. However, she married Scottish businessman Archibald Scott Cleghorn and became the mother Princess Kaʻiulani. In 1876, his cousin Queen Emma considered other possible royal brides for him including Elizabeth Keomailani Crowningburg, Theresa Owana Laʻanui, and possibly the Tahitian nieces of Ninito Sumner from the Salmon family. He would marry Mary Lonokahikini, the widow of Reverend Z. Poli, instead.

In 1872, Kamehameha V died without naming an heir and his cousin Lunalilo was unanimously elected to the throne. The new king died in 1874 after a short reign, also without naming a successor, causing the legislators to convene and elect a new monarch again. From the pool of eligible aliʻi's, only three candidates were considered seriously – Bernice Pauahi Bishop (who did not actively seek the throne), David Kalākaua, and Queen Emma. Kalākaua won the legislative election, and Emma's defeated supporters instigated the Honolulu Courthouse riot immediately after. In order to quell the civil disruption, American and British troops were landed with the permission of the Hawaiian government, and the rioters were arrested. It was speculated that Kūnuiākea would have been the natural choice for heir to his childless cousin if Emma had won the election.

After the controversial 1874 election, Emma's former supporters formed the political opposition party to undermine the new dynasty. Kūnuiākea became a member of this Queen Emma Party and joined with Representatives Joseph Nāwahī of Hilo and George Washington Pilipō of North Kona in forming the native opposition against Kalākaua. Kūnuiākea was elected to the House of Representative, representing the district of Honolulu on Oahu in 1880.

On January 17, 1893, the monarchy was overthrown and Queen Liliʻuokalani was deposed by the Committee of Safety with the covert support of United States Minister John L. Stevens and the landing of American forces from the USS Boston. After a brief transition under the Provisional Government, the oligarchical Republic of Hawaii was established on July 4, 1894, with Sanford B. Dole as president. During this period, the de facto government was composed largely of residents of American and European ancestry, although a few Native Hawaiians including Kūnuiākea served in political roles. He became a member of the Constitutional Convention charged with drafting a new constitution for the Republic and was one of the five Native Hawaiian signatories of the document. (Note: Other Hawaiian signatories include: John Ena, Jose Kekahuna Iosepa, David Haili Kahaulelio, John Kauhane and John William Kalua.)

== Death and funeral ==
Kūnuiākea died on March 10, 1903, in Honolulu, at the age of 51. As a sign of respect to his position as one of the last descendants of Kamehameha the Great, the Hawaiian territorial government held a state funeral for Kūnuiākea. After lying in state in the former throne room of the ʻIolani Palace, he was laid to rest at the Royal Mausoleum at Mauna ʻAla. His remains were moved along with political advisor Robert Crichton Wyllie and other members of Queen Emma's family to the newly-built Wyllie Tomb in June 1904.

== Bibliography ==
- Apple, Russel A. (1978). "Appendix A: Young Family Geneology". Pahukanilua: Homestead of John Young: Kawaihae, Kohala, Island of Hawaiʻi : Historical Data Section of the Historic Structure Report. Honolulu: National Park Office, Hawaii State Office. pp. 39–41. OCLC 4962701.
- Amalu, Sammy (1974). Jack Burns: a Portrait in Transition. Honolulu: Mamalahoa Foundation. OCLC 1055083.
- Beckwith, Martha Warren (1976) [1970]. Hawaiian Mythology. Honolulu: University of Hawaii Press. ISBN 978-0-8248-0514-2. OCLC 170931747.
- Blount, James Henderson (1895). The Executive Documents of the House of Representatives for the Third Session of the Fifty-Third Congress, 1893–'94 in Thirty-Five Volumes. Washington, DC: U.S. Government Printing Office. OCLC 191710879.
- Dabagh, Jean; Lyons, Curtis Jere; Hitchcock, Harvey Rexford (1974). Dabagh, Jean (ed.). "A King is Elected: One Hundred Years Ago" (PDF). The Hawaiian Journal of History. 8. Honolulu: Hawaiian Historical Society: 76–89. hdl:10524/112. OCLC 60626541.
- Haley, James L. (2014). Captive Paradise: A History of Hawaii. New York: St. Martin's Press. ISBN 978-0-312-60065-5.
- Hawaii (1918). Lydecker, Robert Colfax (ed.). Roster Legislatures of Hawaii, 1841–1918. Honolulu: Hawaiian Gazette Company. OCLC 60737418.
- Kaeo, Peter; Queen Emma (1976). Korn, Alfons L. (ed.). News from Molokai, Letters Between Peter Kaeo & Queen Emma, 1873–1876. Honolulu: The University Press of Hawaii. hdl:10125/39980. ISBN 978-0-8248-0399-5. OCLC 2225064.
- Kam, Ralph Thomas (2017). Death Rites and Hawaiian Royalty: Funerary Practices in the Kamehameha and Kalakaua Dynasties, 1819–1953. S. I.: McFarland, Incorporated, Publishers. ISBN 978-1-4766-6846-8. OCLC 966566652.
- Kameʻeleihiwa, Lilikalā (1992). Native Land and Foreign Desires. Honolulu: Bishop Museum Press. ISBN 0-930897-59-5. OCLC 154146650.
- Kanahele, George S. (1999). Emma: Hawaii's Remarkable Queen. Honolulu: University of Hawaii Press. ISBN 978-0-8248-2240-8. OCLC 40890919.
- Klieger, P. Christiaan (1998). Mokuʻula: Maui's Sacred Island. Honolulu: Bishop Museum Press. ISBN 978-1-58178-002-4. OCLC 40142899.
- Kuykendall, Ralph Simpson (1967). The Hawaiian Kingdom 1874–1893, The Kalakaua Dynasty. Vol. 3. Honolulu: University of Hawaii Press. ISBN 978-0-87022-433-1. OCLC 500374815.
- McKinzie, Edith Kawelohea (1983). Stagner, Ishmael W. (ed.). Hawaiian Genealogies: Extracted from Hawaiian Language Newspapers. Vol. 1. Honolulu: University of Hawaii Press. ISBN 0-939154-28-5. OCLC 12555087.
- Osorio, Jon Kamakawiwoʻole (2002). Dismembering Lāhui: A History of the Hawaiian Nation to 1887. Honolulu: University of Hawaii Press. ISBN 0-8248-2549-7. OCLC 48579247.
- Silva, Noenoe K. (2004). Aloha Betrayed: Native Hawaiian Resistance to American Colonialism. Durham: Duke University Press. ISBN 0-8223-8622-4. OCLC 191222123.
