= William White =

William White may refer to:

== Politics ==
- William White (MP for City of London), for City of London (Parliament of England constituency)
- William White (MP for Lymington) (died 1594), MP for Lymington
- William White (MP for Clitheroe) (1606–1661), MP for Clitheroe in 1660
- William White (Secretary of State) (1762–1811), North Carolina secretary of state, 1798–1811
- William Duckett White (1807–1893), member of the Queensland Legislative Council
- William White (Maryland politician) (1824–1885), American politician from Maryland
- Sir William Arthur White (1824–1891), British diplomat
- William White (New Zealand politician) (1849–1900), New Zealand Member of Parliament
- William J. White (politician) (1850–1923), United States representative from Ohio
- William Pūnohu White (1851–1925), Hawaiian politician
- William White (Canadian politician) (1856–1953), elected member of the 1st Council of the Northwest Territories, 1883–1885
- Sir William Thomas White (1866–1955), Canadian politician and cabinet minister
- William Henry White (politician) (1865–1930), Canadian Member of Parliament from Alberta
- William P. White (mayor) (died 1938), mayor of Lawrence, Massachusetts

== Judges ==
- William White (Ohio judge) (1822–1883), Republican politician in the U.S. State of Ohio and Ohio Supreme Court judge
- William H. White (judge) (1842–1914), justice of the Washington Supreme Court
- William Sylvester White (1914–2004), American judge and member of the Golden Thirteen

== Religion ==
- William White (bishop of Pennsylvania) (1748–1836), Episcopal bishop in America, Presiding Bishop and Chaplain of Congress
- William C. White (1854–1937), son of Seventh-day Adventist Church founder Ellen G. White
- William White (bishop of Newfoundland) (1865–1943), Anglican bishop in Canada
- William White (bishop of Honan) (1873–1960), Anglican bishop in China
- William White (bishop of the Southeast) (born 1947), Reformed Episcopal Church bishop in South Carolina
- William A. White (1874–1936), American-Canadian Baptist minister, and only Black military chaplain in the British Empire during World War I
- William J. White (journalist) (1831–1913), African-American civil rights leader, journalist (editor of the Georgia Baptist), educator, and minister in Augusta, Georgia
- William White (priest), Anglican priest in Ireland in the late 18th and early 19th centuries
- William White (missionary) (1794–1875), missionary for the Wesleyan Church in New Zealand

== Sports ==
- William White (footballer) (born 1995), Bermudan footballer
- William White (American football) (1966–2022), American football player
- William C. White (American football) (1896–1986), American football coach
- Will White (American football) (born 1970), American football player
- Will White (Australian footballer) (born 2004), Australian rules football player
- William Edward White (1860–1937), American baseball first baseman, possibly the first African-American to play major league baseball
- Will White (1854–1911), American baseball pitcher and manager
- William White (field hockey) (1920–1990), Scottish sportsman who played cricket and field hockey
- William White (British Army officer) (1879–1951), English cricketer
- William White (Guyanese cricketer) (born 1953), Guyanese cricketer
- William White (sport shooter) (1912–2011), British Olympic shooter
- William "Deacon" White (1878–1939), American educator, athlete, coach, manager, team owner and sports promoter in Edmonton, Alberta, Canada

== Music, media, and writers ==
- William White (composer) (1571–c. 1634), English composer
- William White (printer) (before 1577–1618), based in London, printed the first quarto of Shakespeare's Love's Labors Lost (1598) for publisher Cuthbert Burby
- William White (publisher) (1799–1868), publisher of White's Directories in the 19th century
- William White (journalist) (1807–1882), British pamphleteer and parliamentary sketch writer
- William Allen White (1868–1944), American newspaper editor
- William Lindsay White (1900–1973), American journalist, son of William Allen White
- William Chapman White (1903–1955), American journalist
- William S. White (1905–1994), American journalist and biographer
- William White (academic) (1910–1995), American academic of journalism and bibliographer
- William Anthony Parker White (1911–1968), better known by his pen name Anthony Boucher, American author, critic, and editor
- William White (actor) (1921–1985), film producer and actor
- William H. White (publisher) (c. 1925–1989), American author, editor and publisher
- William H. White (maritime writer), American naval historical novelist
- William White, one of the pseudonyms of Finnish singer Irwin Goodman (1943–1991)
- William White, one of the (now unused) pseudonyms of American rapper Dylan Ross (born 1991)
- William White, one of the members of the American indie rock band Glass Beach

== Military ==
- William Allison White (1894–1974), English recipient of the Victoria Cross
- Sir William Henry White (1845–1913), British warship designer
- William J. White (general) (1925–2017), American general
- William White (conscientious objector), Australian conscientious objector during the Vietnam War
- William R. White (United States Army officer) (1887–1975), U.S. Army general
- William Sylvester White (1914–2004), American judge and member of the Golden Thirteen

== Architecture ==
- William White (architect, born 1825) (1825–1900), English architect
- William H. White (architect) (1838–1896), British architect

== Science and medicine ==
- William Alanson White (1870–1937), American neurologist and alienist
- William Comings White (1890–1965), engineer, General Electric, Schenectady, NY
- William E. White, American neurologist and author
- J. William White (1850–1916), American surgeon
- William L. White (born 1947), writer on addiction recovery and policy
- William Toby White, Australian ichthyologist

== Others ==
- William White (master) (fl.1505–1539), English academic, master of Balliol College, Oxford
- William White (Mayflower passenger) (c. 1580–1621)
- William Hale White (1831–1913), English writer and civil servant
- William R. White (academic administrator) (1892–1977), president of Hardin-Simmons University, and of Baylor University
- William White (gangster) (1900–1934), Prohibition gangster and Chicago Outfit gunman
- Larry Grayson (1923–1995), English stand-up comedy and gameshow host, born William White
- William White (economist) (born 1943), Canadian economist

== See also ==
- Bill White (disambiguation)
- Willie White (disambiguation)
- William Whyte (disambiguation)
