= John William Kalua =

American lawyer

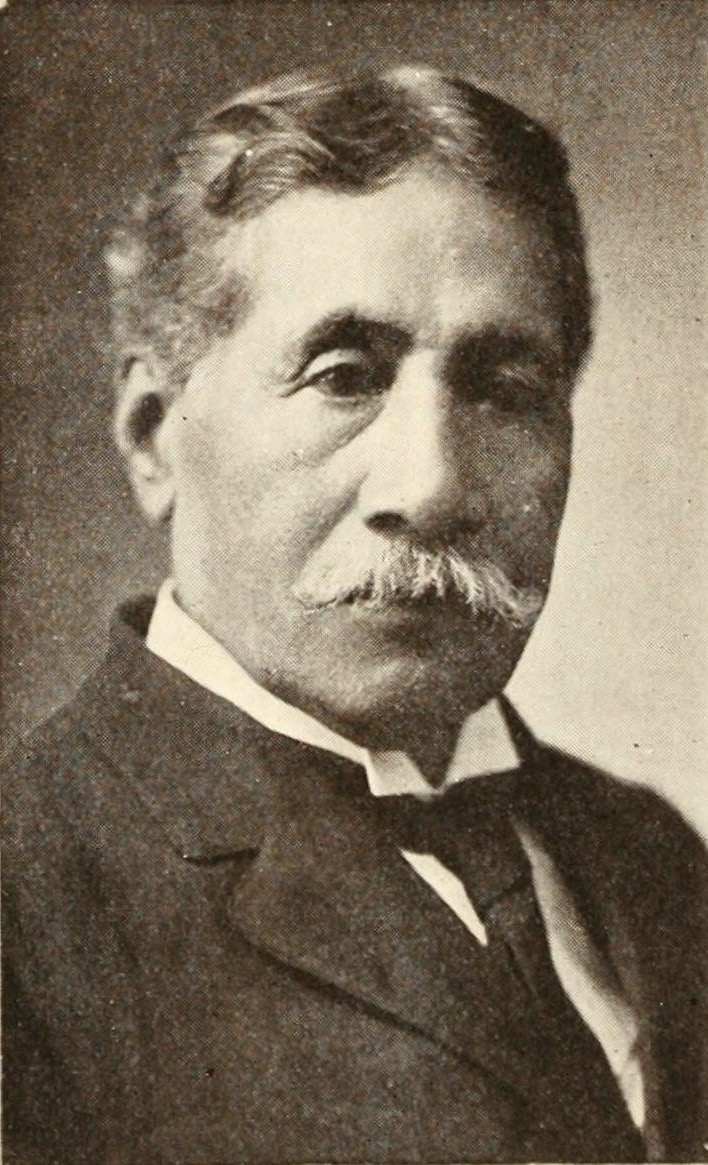
- John William Kalua, 1917

Member of the Kingdom of Hawaii House of Representatives for the island of Maui
- In office 1880, 1882, 1884, 1886, 1890

Member of the Territory of Hawaii House of Representatives
- In office 1920–1923

Personal details
- Born: c. 1846 Molokai, Kingdom of Hawaii
- Died: April 8, 1928 (aged 81–82) Wailuku, Maui County, Territory of Hawaii
- Resting place: Iao Community Cemetery
- Party: Republican; National Reform; Reform; Kuokoa
- Occupation: Lawyer, Politician

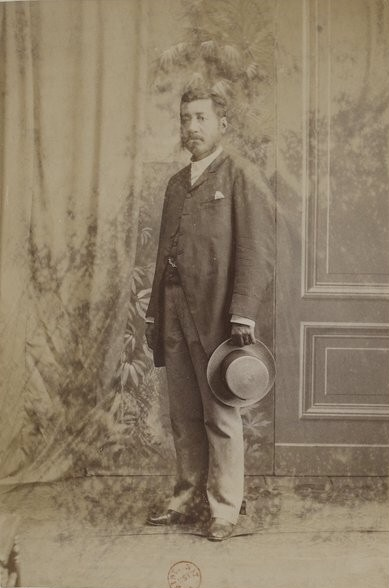
John William Kalua, c. 1898–99

John William Kalua, sometime referred to as Keahiowailuku, (c. 1846 – April 8, 1928) was a Native Hawaiian politician of Hawaii. He served in the legislature of the Kingdom of Hawaii and the Territory of Hawaii for the island of Maui.

== Life and career ==
Originally from the island of Molokai, Kalua later moved to the island of Maui where he worked as a lawyer. During the monarchy, Kalua served as a member of the House of Representatives, the lower house of the Hawaiian legislature, for the districts of Lahaina (1882, 1884, 1886) and Wailuku (1880 and 1890), Maui. He sat in during the legislative sessions of 1880, 1882, 1884, 1886, and 1890 during the reign of King Kalākaua.

In his early political career, he was a leading politician of Independent (Kuokoa) Party against the governmentally-backed National Party. He and politicians such as Joseph Nāwahī of Hilo and George Washington Pilipō of North Kona joined in forming the native opposition in the house against the king. In the election of 1886, Kalakaua allegedly journeyed to Maui and Hawaii to sway the electorate to vote against these three men.

After the king was forced to sign the Bayonet Constitution, in 1887 relinquishing much of his power and disenfranchising many poor Native Hawaiian voters, Kalua became a member National Reform and was elected to the 1890 session as a representative for Wailuku. This party had been established in opposition to the Reform Party (led by many descendants of American missionaries), which had forced King Kalākaua to sign the unpopular Bayonet Constitution of 1887. He resigned on September 9, 1890, after a dispute with fellow party member Edward C. MacFarlane. In the next election, he switched party alliance and ran as a Reform candidate in Lahaina but was defeated by National Liberal candidate William Pūnohu White.

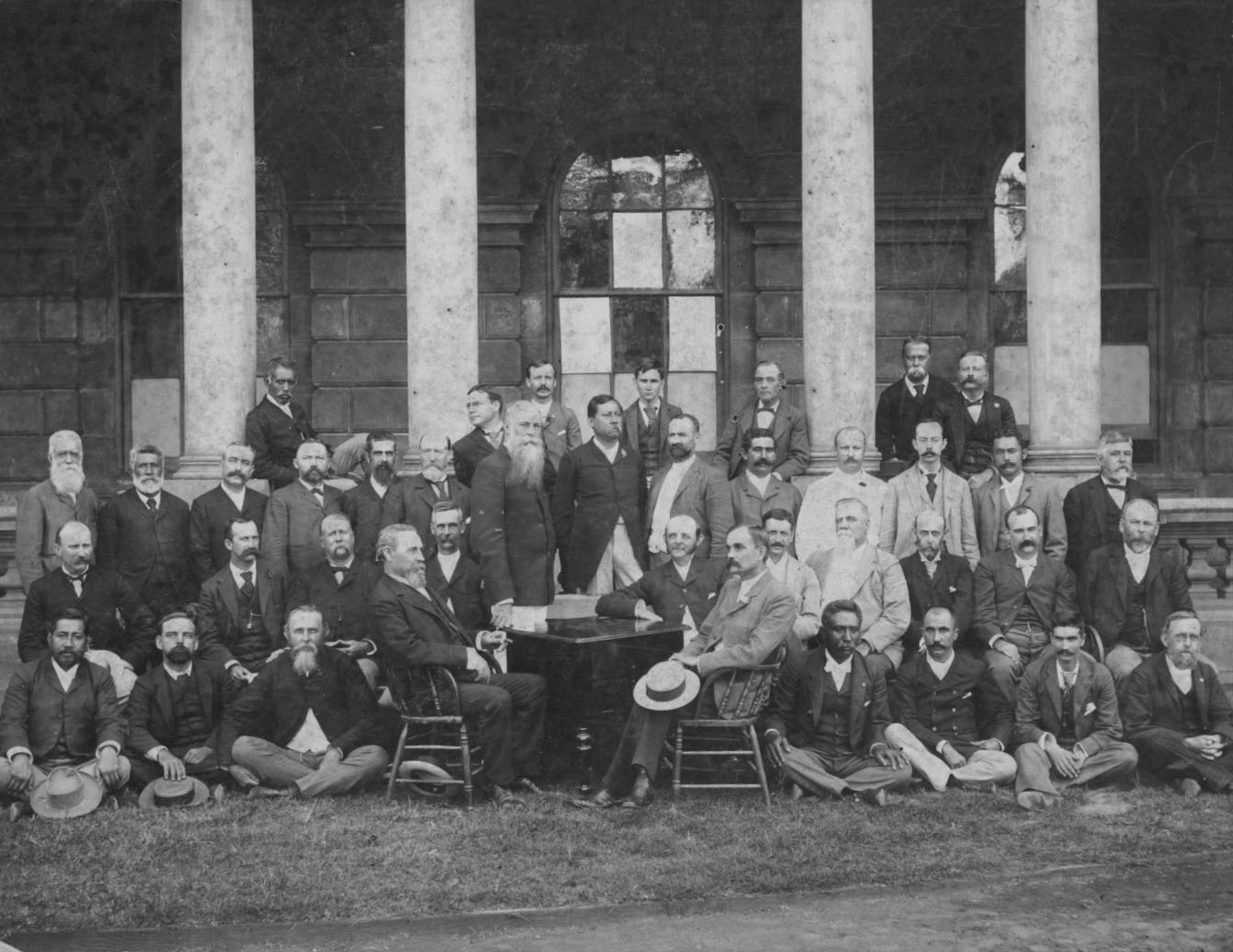
Members of the Constitutional Convention, Republic of Hawaii, 1894

The monarchy was overthrown on January 17, 1893, by the Committee of Safety, with the support of United States Minister John L. Stevens and the landing of American forces from the USS Boston. The Provisional Government was established until an annexation treaty with the United States could be ratified. During this turbulent time, Kalua joined the side advocating for the annexation of Hawaii to the United States. According to the testimony of Minister Stevens in the Blount Report, "Hon. John W. Kalua, the ablest native lawyer in the islands, years a member of former legislatures, from the important island of Maui, thinks the fall of the Queen and the extinction of the monarchy a boon to Hawaii, and he is for annexation." He was a participant of the Constitutional Convention for the oligarchical Republic of Hawaii, which was established on July 4, 1894, and was one of the five Native Hawaiian signatories of the Republic's constitution. He also was the president of the Annexation Club on Maui.

He served as Judge of the Second Circuit Court from September 1, 1894 to April 7, 1904, when he was removed from office by President Roosevelt. During the territorial period, he became a Republican and served on the House of Representative of the Territory of Hawaii from 1920 to 1923.

After an illness of several weeks, Kalua died at the Malulani Hospital in Wailuku, on April 8, 1928. He was buried in the Iao Community Cemetery in Wailuku.

== Bibliography ==
- Blount, James Henderson (1895). The Executive Documents of the House of Representatives for the Third Session of the Fifty-Third Congress, 1893–'94 in Thirty-Five Volumes. Washington, DC: U.S. Government Printing Office. OCLC 191710879.
- Hawaii (1918). Lydecker, Robert Colfax (ed.). Roster Legislatures of Hawaii, 1841–1918. Honolulu: Hawaiian Gazette Company. OCLC 60737418.
- Kuykendall, Ralph Simpson (1967). The Hawaiian Kingdom 1874–1893, The Kalakaua Dynasty. Vol. 3. Honolulu: University of Hawaii Press. ISBN 978-0-87022-433-1. OCLC 500374815.
- Loomis, Albertine (1963). "The Longest Legislature" (PDF). Seventy-First Annual Report of the Hawaiian Historical Society for the Year 1962. 71. Honolulu: Hawaiian Historical Society: 7–27. hdl:10524/35.
- Osorio, Jon Kamakawiwoʻole (2002). Dismembering Lāhui: A History of the Hawaiian Nation to 1887. Honolulu: University of Hawaii Press. ISBN 0-8248-2549-7. OCLC 48579247.
