= William Whyte =

William Whyte may refer to:

- Sir William Whyte (banker) (died 1945), Scottish banker
- William Whyte (baseball) (1860–1911), American baseball player
- William Whyte (footballer), Scottish footballer
- William Whyte (historian) (born 1975), architectural and social historian
- William Whyte (railway manager) (1843–1914), Canadian Pacific Railway Company executive
- William Whyte (runner) (1903–1964), Australian athlete
- William Foote Whyte (1914–2000), sociologist
- William H. Whyte (1917–1999), sociologist and author of The Organization Man
- William Pinkney Whyte (1824–1908), politician from the State of Maryland, United States
- Sir William Whyte (solicitor) (died 1950), British solicitor
- Sir William Marcus Charles Beresford Whyte (1863–1932), British naval officer
- Sir (William Erskine) Hamilton Whyte (1927–1990), British diplomat
- Bill Whyte, professor of social work at the University of Edinburgh

== See also ==
- William White (disambiguation)
