= 1884 Hawaiian legislative election =

Legislative elections were held in the Hawaiian Kingdom on 6 February 1884 to determine the composition of the 28 member Hawaiian House of Representatives. The elections saw the emergence of the Independent (Kūʻokoʻa) Party that opposed the policies of the administration of King Kalākaua and Premier Walter M. Gibson. Despite the growing opposition, Gibson's National Party was able to maintain a majority in the House of Representatives.

== Background ==
After King Lunalilo’s brief reign ended with his death, Kalākaua was elected as King of Hawaiʻi, largely by Americans who favored his pro-American foreign policy. However, he would shock his supporters by taking the counsel of Walter Murray Gibson, a former Mormon missionary and supporter of Native Hawaiian rights. He would quickly become Premier of the Kingdom and be called Kalākaua's "Minister of Everything", setting much of Hawaiian domestic and foreign policy until 1887.

Many of the wealthy White plantation owners of Hawaiʻi opposed Gibson's dominance of government and policies. In 1883, before the elections, wealthy white business professionals, such as Lorrin A. Thurston, Sanford Dole, and William R. Castle, convened with Native leaders who opposed Gibson's administration and formed the loose Independent Party, led by Thurston.

The supporters of King Kalākaua and W. Gibson would form the National Party (also known as the Government Party).

== Results ==
After a close election, the Gibson's National Party maintained control of the House of Representatives, although now starkly divided with the rising Independents.

Party	Seats
National Party	15
Independent (Kūʻokoʻa) Party	13
Total	28
Source: Moblo
