= Scarsdale Inquirer =

Local weekly newspaper

- Type: Weekly newspaper
- Publisher: Deborah White
- Editor-in-chief: Valerie Abrahams
- Founded: 1901
- Ceased publication: 2024
- Headquarters: 1075 Central Park Ave. Suite 101 Scarsdale, NY 10583
- Website: scarsdalenews.com

Scarsdale Inquirer was a local newspaper in Scarsdale, New York founded in 1901 as a weekly. The paper's weekly print edition was published on Fridays; and its website's daily e-Edition was self-described as "365 days."

== History ==
The first issue of the newspaper was dated July 4, 1901. By 1980 the newspaper was up to its seventh publisher. Its founder died in 1929; the first publisher, who died in 1970, "frequently gave lectures based on Scarsdale history and was appointed historian in 1965."

The Scarsdale Woman's Club was organized in 1918, and one year later they bought and began publishing the paper. They sold it about 40 years later.

From 1980 until his death in 1989, William H. White "was the owner and publisher of the Scarsdale Inquirer." He was succeeded by his daughter Deborah.

Their website is named scarsdalenews.com, and it competes with (and is mentioned by) Scarsdale News and Opinion, a part of the patch.com hyperlocal website. The Inquirer is cited by other newspapers.

On January 15, 2024, the newspaper suspended publication citing financial difficulties having failed to distribute its usual Friday, January 12 edition.
