= Mick Meaney =

Irish barman (1935–2003)

Michael "Mick" Meaney
- Born: c. 1935; Ballyporeen, Co. Tipperary, Ireland
- Died: 17 February 2003 (aged 67–68); Mitchelstown, Co. Cork, Ireland
- Monuments: New Square, Mitchelstown
- Occupations: Builder, barman
- Known for: Burial alive (1968)

Michael "Mick" Meaney was an Irish barman and burial artist who gained notoriety for being entombed alive in an underground coffin for 61 days in 1968.

== Biography ==
Michael Meaney was born circa 1935 in County Tipperary, Ireland. He worked as a builder and laborer and had dreams of a boxing career. In the early 1960s, Meaney became a barman for former strongman Michael "Butty" Sugrue at the Admiral Nelson pub in Kilburn, London. Human endurance contests and specifically enduring premature burial had become a fad in the 1960s. Meaney had survived a workplace accident in which he was buried under rubble and thought he could endure the task for a longer period of time. He and Sugrue developed the idea of the publicity stunt, enlisting local friend Mick Keane who would provide the land for the burial, as well as the truck to transport the coffin.

On February 21 1968, Sugrue hosted a final dinner and "live wake" at the Admiral Nelson pub, inviting press and general public to attend. Irish tenor Jack Doyle sang and spectators watched as Meaney was transported in a coffin from the pub to Keane's yard where he was lowered into the ground. Meaney failed to notify his pregnant wife who learned of the stunt on the radio. Meaney's coffin measured 6 feet, 3 inches long; 2 feet, 6 inches wide; and 2 feet high and was lined in foam. Food and drink were lowered to him and onlookers could visit and speak to him via a telephone. There were no official safety measures for keeping Meaney alive and it was discussed at the House of Commons as to whether they should intervene. Meanwhile, American burial artist Country Bill White was attempting the same feat. The BBC fixed a live satellite link between London and the United States in order to broadcast a joint interview between the pair. White lasted 55 days underground.

Meaney claimed he could last 100 days underground but Sugrue insisted that Meaney emerge after 61 days. On April 22 1968, the coffin was raised and Meaney was swarmed with press. Undertaker Paddy Ryan said he experienced a career first, a man coming back alive. “He was alive and well. Mike Meaney lives to be buried again,” newsreaders across the world told their audiences that night and newsreel footage was taken by British Pathe. According to Meaney's daughter, English actress Diana Dors had her picture taken with him and boxing icon Joe Louis called him. Meaney's fame was fleeting; a supposed deal with Gillette and a world tour never came to fruition and his name never made it to the Guinness Book of Records because no judge was present at the event.

== Legacy ==
Meaney died on February 17, 2003, with the priest telling the mourning congregation: "I’ve never buried someone who has been buried before." In 2022, Meaney was honoured with a monument in his adopted town of Mitchelstown.

Meaney's story has been recorded in print, radio and film media. In 2015, Meaney's daughter, Mary Meaney, wrote a memoir about her father entitled You Can't Eat Roses, Mary!. In 2021, RTÉ Radio One broadcast a radio documentary, Mick Meaney - Buried Alive. In 2025, a film about Meaney, Beo Faoin bhFód (Buried Alive), directed by Daire Collins, premiered at the Galway Film Fleadh and was broadcast on TG4.
