= Proposed 1893 Constitution of the Hawaiian Kingdom =

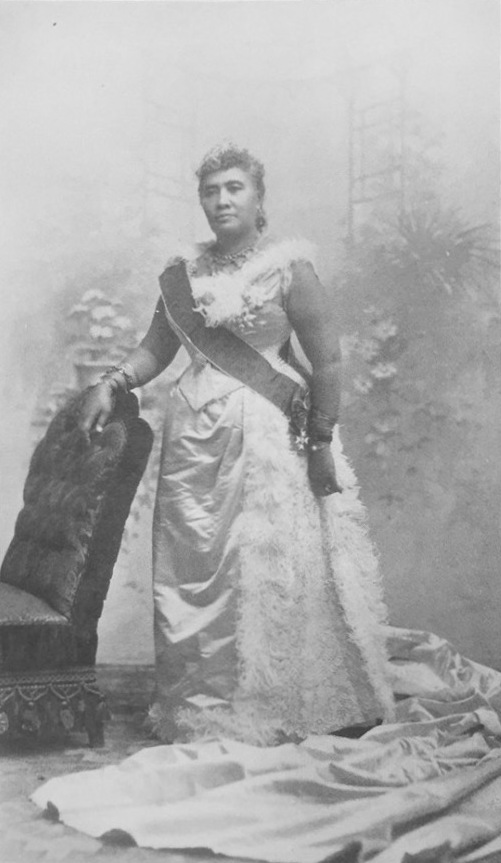
Queen Liliʻuokalani wrote the draft 1893 constitution.

The proposed 1893 Constitution of the Hawaiian Kingdom would have been a replacement of the Constitution of 1887, primarily based on the Constitution of 1864 put forth by Queen Liliʻuokalani. While it never became anything more than a draft, the constitution had a profound impact on Hawaiʻi's history: it set off a chain of events that eventually resulted in the overthrow of the Hawaiian Kingdom.

== Background ==
Prior to 1887, the monarchs of Hawaiʻi ruled the kingdom as executive monarchs. Following the writing of the 1887 Constitution, however, the monarch was reduced to a mere figurehead.

During the 1890 legislature, the Hawaiian king, Kalākaua, backed a number of proposals to amend or rewrite the 1887 constitution. However, all of these measures failed.

In 1891, Liliʻuokalani ascended the throne. In 1892, she backed measures in the kingdom's legislature to amend or rewrite the constitution. However, the measures failed as they had during the reign of her brother. Among the measures that failed was an amendment that would lower the property requirement to vote so most of the general public could vote. When that was voted down, many Hawaiian citizens protested. The Queen received petitions in the thousands to issue a new constitution as Kamehameha V had done in 1864 (the Constitution of 1864). Liliʻuokalani was assisted by Hawaiian legislators Joseph Nāwahī and William Pūnohu White and the captain of the Household Guards Samuel Nowlein with the drafting of the new constitution.

== The proposed Constitution ==
The constitution that Liliʻuokalani proposed differed from the 1887 constitution in the following respects:

- Members of the privy council, notary public, and agents would be able to run for the legislature.
- Princess Kaʻiulani, Prince Kawānanakoa and Prince Kalanianaʻole would be added to the line of succession.
- The Queen would be given the power to call meetings of the legislature.
- The legislature would meet for regular sessions in April instead of May.
- The Queen’s private lands and other property were made inviolable.
- The Queen would sign all bills before they became law. Under the 1887 constitution, any bills vetoed by the Queen and then repassed by the legislature with a two-thirds majority would automatically become law without the signature of the Queen. Under the proposed 1893 constitution, the Queen would be obligated to sign all bills repassed by the legislature with a two-thirds majority.
- The pay of the legislators would be increased from $250 to $500.
- Nobles would be appointed by the Queen instead of elected.
- The number of representatives could be increased from 24 to 48.
- Property requirements for voters were decreased.
- American and European residents, granted suffrage in 1887, would lose the right to vote.
- Supreme court judges would be appointed for six years instead of for life.
- The Queen would be able to appoint governors of each island for four years.
- Article 78 of the 1887 Constitution which required the monarch to perform "with the advice and consent of the Cabinet" was left out.

== Backlash ==
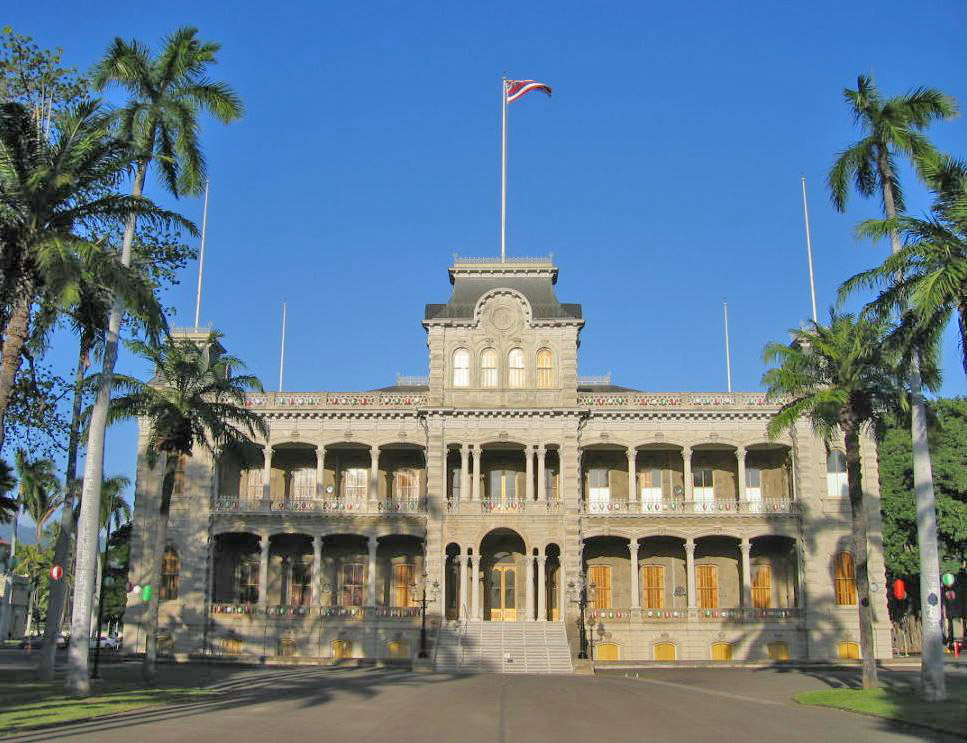
Queen Lili’uokalani met with her ministers at ‘Iolani Palace about her new constitution while thousands of Native Hawaiians waited outside for the constitution's proclamation.

=== Events leading to January 14, 1893 ===
In the weeks prior, her cabinet had all individually confided in the Queen stressing to her all for the need for a new constitution. The Queen then called meetings at Muʻolaulani Palace to have a chance to hear everyone’s thoughts regarding constitutional reform. The conclusion of these meetings received the same (yes) response from the entire cabinet. Having been assured that they were all aligned in a like-minded plan, and trusting in their loyalty to the constitutional government they swore to uphold under oath when appointed to each of their positions; the draft for a new constitution had begun.

=== January 14, 1893 ===
On January 14, 1893, the Queen met with her cabinet at ʻIolani Palace. None of her ministers agreed to sign the constitution. In fact, the ministers intention was never to sign the constitution at all. They were and had already been actively informing the Queen's political enemies of her plans, and were more than aware of the unnecessary turmoil that their actions were soon to ignite. The Queen, though anxious from what was all too clear to her at that point a set-up, was far more concerned with what this would mean for Native Hawaiians. The Bayonet Constitution was directly oppressing, depriving, and restricting their rights, and they alone were suffering for it. During the election of 1892 out of the 9,500 registered voters, 7,000, or 3/4 of them had formally sent signed petitions to the Queen expressing their plea for a new constitution. Her response was “To have ignored or disregarded so general a request I must have been deaf to the voice of the people, which tradition tells us that is the voice of God. No true Hawaiian chief would have done other than to promise a consideration of their wishes.”

Outside, a large crowd of Native Hawaiians had gathered, expecting the Queen to proclaim a new constitution. However, after her meeting with her cabinet, Liliʻuokalani instead went outside onto the palace balcony and told the crowd that a new constitution would have to wait and that they should peacefully return to their homes.

That evening, a group of the Queen's opponents met to discuss the events of the day. Most were concerned over the Queen's attempt to restore the power of the crown. Some annexationists, like Henry Baldwin, urged moderation but others, like Lorrin A. Thurston urged the complete overthrow of the monarchy. A plan of action was created by the group, including the creation of a Committee of Safety, the overthrow of the monarchy, the establishment of a provisional government, and the petitioning for annexation to the United States.

=== Overthrow of the Kingdom ===
The following Monday, the Queen issued a statement saying that she would not attempt to amend the constitution except by the means provided in the 1887 constitution. However, the Committee of Safety did not believe her promise was sincere, and continued with their planning. A group of men mostly drawn from the ranks of the Reform Party of the Hawaiian Kingdom formed the Committee of Safety and asked the United States Minister, John L. Stevens, to land troops from the U.S.S. Boston (anchored in Honolulu Harbor) into Honolulu, “to protect American lives and property.” John L. Stevens, reacting to what he saw as potential unrest as the internal crisis continued, requested the landing of 300 Marines, who were given specific orders by Captain G. C. Wiltse to "land in Honolulu for the purpose of protecting our legation, consulate, and the lives and property of American citizens, and to assist in preserving public order." At 2:00pm on January 17, 1893, a proclamation was read on the steps of Government building, declaring the monarchy overthrown. U.S. troops were at the time stationed at Arion Hall, the U.S. Consulate, and the U.S. Legation. The Queen abdicated under protest ostensibly "to the superior force of the United States government", though her surrender was delivered to the Provisional Government, not the United States. The Kingdom of Hawaiʻi had ended, and a new provisional government was declared.

The Provisional Government quickly gained recognition from the United States Government and all the other governments with embassies in Hawaiʻi, but was opposed by the administration of Grover Cleveland for years as he attempted to restore the monarchy, beginning with the Blount Report. President Grover Cleveland, in a message to Congress on December 18, 1893, denounced the actions of Minister Stevens, the Honolulu Rifles and the Committee of Safety as an "act of war, committed with the participation of a diplomatic representative of the United States and without authority of Congress."

== Liliʻuokalani's trial ==
In 1895, an abortive attempt by Hawaiian royalists to restore Queen Liliʻuokalani to power resulted in the queen's arrest. She was forced to sign a document of abdication that relinquished all her future claims to the throne. Following this, she was subject to a public trial before a military tribunal in her former throne room.

Convicted of having knowledge of a royalist plot, Liliʻuokalani was fined $5000 and sentenced to five years in prison and hard labor. The sentence was commuted to imprisonment in an upstairs bedroom of ʻIolani Palace. During her imprisonment, the queen was denied any visitors other than one lady in waiting. She began each day with her daily devotions followed by reading, quilting, crochet-work, or music composition.

After her release from ʻIolani Palace, the queen remained under house arrest for five months at her private home, Washington Place. For another eight months she was forbidden to leave Oʻahu before all restrictions were lifted.
