= Billy White (disambiguation) =

Billy White (1936–2000) was an English footballer.

Billy White may also refer to:

- Billy White (basketball) (born 1989), American professional basketball player
- Billy White Acre, Canadian film score composer, singer-songwriter, guitarist, and record producer
- Billy White Wolf, ring name of Adnan Al-Kaissie (1939–2023), Iraqi-American professional wrestler and manager
- Billy White, Belize, a village in Cayo District, Belize

== See also ==
- Bill White (disambiguation)
- Willie White (disambiguation)
