= Adam Pali =

Hawaiian pastor and politician

The Honorable Adam Pali

Member of the Republic of Hawaii House of Representatives for the district of Lahaina, Maui
- In office 1894-1897
- Preceded by: William Pūnohu White

Personal details
- Born: c. 1836 Waimea, Hawaii Island, Hawaiian Kingdom
- Died: October 9, 1903 Lahaina, Territory of Hawaii
- Resting place: Kahoma Valley
- Party: Maui Union Party
- Spouse: (Lilia) Paʻaoʻao Poholopū Pali
- Children: 6
- Parent(s): Pali, (father) Papaua (mother)
- Occupation: Pastor, Politician

Adam Pali (c. 1836 - October 9, 1903) was a native Hawaiian politician and pastor of the Kingdom and Republic of Hawaii. Pali first served as pastor for Waine‘e Church before being elected as Representative of Lahaina under the government of the Republic of Hawaii.

== Early life ==
Adam Pali was born in Waimea, Hawaii County, Hawaii in 1836. In 1862, He studied under Lorenzo Lyons in Kohala, Hawaii for a while before being married to Paʻaoʻao Poholopū the following year. He then served as pastor at Hanalei Church in Kaua‘i for almost a decade.

== Preaching at Lahaina ==
In 1875, after Pali arrived in Lahaina, he began preaching at the nearby Waine‘e Church and was moderately known.

In May 1893, Pali was discovered to have signed an annexationist roll, this subsequently angered the members of Waine‘e Church, along with William Pūnohu White, who in response voted Pali out of the premises by June. Pali defended his case as the local government and Hawaiian Evangelical Association vetoed the vote against Pali, and over the course of a meeting on June 8, Pali was allowed to enter the church again, albeit with church attendance at Waine’e significantly dropping.

== Time in the Legislature ==
Sometime between May 1893 and October 1894, Pali was elected Representative of Lahaina. On May 30, 1893, he was appointed Commissioner of Private Ways and Rights of the district of Lahaina. An election held in October of 1894 saw Pali running for Representative of Lahaina under the Maui Union Party. Pali left the legislature sometime between 1897 and 1898.

Adam Pali died on October 9, 1903 of an illness in Lahaina, Maui.
