= Country Bill White =

American burial artist (1934–2006)

Charles William White (c. 1934 – 2006), known by his stage name "Country" Bill White, was an American burial artist who gained notoriety as the "living corpse" and was voluntarily buried alive as a publicity stunt throughout the 1960s–1980s.

== Career ==
White was born in the Florida panhandle. He met burial artist Herbert "Digger" O'Dell Smith in 1964 and decided to attempt to endure voluntary burial himself. He was buried at Christie's Beachcomber in Galveston for 49 days, breaking O'Dell's record. By 1966, he was touring as "The Human Corpse" or "The Living Corpse", releasing a few tie-in country LPs as well. On June 9, 1966, he married Lottie White who also volunteered to be buried alive, billing herself as "Mrs. Living Corpse." The couple divorced in 1968. White married 7 times in his lifetime. In April 1968, he was buried for 62 days, besting Irish burial artist Michael "Mick" Meaney. BBC fixed a live satellite link between London and the States in order to broadcast a joint interview between the pair.

He missed the Blizzard of 1978 entirely as he was buried for 134 days, 2 hours, and 55 minutes during it. In 1981, after being voluntarily buried for 140 days, he vowed to never allow himself to be buried again. White's records were held by the Guinness Book of World Records until 1987 at which time they stopped covering burial artists out of safety. He died on December 21, 2006.
