= Bill White (footballer, born 1907) =

Scottish footballer

Personal information
- Full name: William Walter White
- Date of birth: 26 July 1907
- Place of birth: Kirkcaldy, Scotland
- Height: 5 ft 8 1/2 in (1.74 m)
- Position: Inside forward

Senior career*
| Years | Team | Apps | (Gls) |
| | Musselburgh Bruntonians | ? | |
| 1926–1927 | Reading | 0 | (0) |
| 1927–1928 | Bristol Rovers | 8 | (0) |
| 1928–1929 | Southport | 0 | (0) |
| 1929–1930 | Charlton Athletic | 0 | (0) |
| 1930–1932 | Gillingham | 64 | (18) |
| 1932–1933 | Aldershot | 71 | (10) |
| 1933–1934 | Carlisle United | 8 | (2) |
| 1934 | Manchester City | 0 | (0) |
| 1934 | Newport County | 19 | (3) |
| 1934–1936 | Bristol City | 50 | (15) |
| 1936–1938 | Lincoln City | 46 | (11) |
| 1938–1939 | Hull City | 2 | (0) |
- * Club domestic league appearances and goals as of 10:00, 31 December 2007 (UTC)

William Walter White (26 July 1907 – after 1938) was a Scottish professional footballer whose clubs included Bristol Rovers, Aldershot, Carlisle United, Bristol City and Gillingham. He made 268 appearances in the Football League.
