= Independent (Kuokoa) Party =

Independent Party
- Headquarters: Honolulu, Hawaii
- Ideology: Independent; Anti-establishment

The Independent Party (Hawaiian: Kūʻokoʻa) was a political party in the Kingdom of Hawaii formed with the purpose of providing resources and benefits of a political party to independent politicians.

== Emmaites ==
Despite the original purpose of the Kuokoa Party former member of the Queen Emma Party joined as their party declined and, following the elections of 1882, disbanded. Some of these former Emmaites were George W. Pilipō, Joseph K. Nawahi, and Albert K. Kunuiakea.

== Missionaries ==
The Missionary Party was a pro-American, pro-business party who developed an unpopular reputation as rich, White American businessmen. In 1880 and 1882 some Missionaries ran as Kuokoa Party candidates to distance themselves from the stigma of their own party. Interested by this strategy the Missionary Party ran all their candidates as Independents in the elections of 1884 and 1886. A special Missionary group called the Committee of Nine was established to occupy the leadership positions of the Kuokoa Party and favor the Missionary candidates.

== Two party system ==
In 1884 a two-party system emerged in Hawaii with the consolidation of opposition to the National Party. The general ideology of the Kuokoa Party was, basically, positions other than that of the ruling National Party for the various reasons of individual Independents. Such an example was opposition to King Kalākaua, the range of opposition varied from preferring Queen Emma on the throne, abolishing the monarchy and forming a republic, to annexing Hawaii to the United States.

== Bayonet Constitution ==
Disappointed with the results of the 1886 elections the Missionaries forced the Bayonet Constitution on the government. The new Constitution slanted elections in the favor of the Missionaries and they departed the Kuokoa party. In the elections of 1887, the Missionary Party renamed themselves the Reform Party and ran candidates as their own party.

== Native Sons ==
The departure of the Missionaries left a vacuum in the Kuokoa Party that was eventually filled by the Native Sons of Hawaii. The Native Sons was a pro-monarchy, Pro-Hawaiians political organization that supported the National Reform Party. The Kuokoa Party reflected the positions of the Native Sons and became a secondary party for districts without a National Reform candidates.
