= William Whyte (footballer) =

Scottish footballer

Personal information
- Full name: William J Whyte
- Place of birth: Scotland
- Positions: Forward; wing half

Youth career
- Garrioch Youth Club

Senior career*
Years	Team	Apps	(Gls)
1969–1972	Queen's Park	67	(5)

International career
1971–1972	Scotland Amateurs	5	(0)
- * Club domestic league appearances and goals

William J. Whyte is a Scottish retired amateur football forward and wing half who played in the Scottish League for Queen's Park. He was capped by Scotland at amateur level.
