= Willie White =

Willie White may refer to:

- Willie White (basketball) (born 1962), American basketball player
- Willie White (footballer, born 1895) (1895–1974), Scottish footballer
- Willie White (footballer, born 1932) (1932–2015), Scottish footballer
- Willie White, fictional character from the television series Doug
- Willye White (1939–2007), American women's track and field athlete
- Willie White (sprinter) (born 1938), American men's track and field athlete, 1958 All-American for the California Golden Bears track and field team

== See also ==
- Will White (1854–1911), American baseball player
- William White (disambiguation)
- Billy White (disambiguation)
