= William H. White (publisher) =

Newspaper owner/publisher

William Henry White (c. 1925–1989) was the owner and publisher of the Scarsdale Inquirer and the Hastings Enterprise from 1980 and 1984 respectively, until his death in 1989.

== Early life ==
White was a 1949 graduate of the Graduate School of Journalism at Columbia University.

== Career ==
The New York Times described him as "an author, editor and publisher." He purchased and served as publisher of The Scarsdale Inquirer in 1980. In 1984 he bought Hastings Enterprise, "a paper covering Hastings-on-Hudson, Dobbs Ferry, Ardsley and Irvington." There too White served as publisher. He also used the business name S. I. Communications.

== Family ==
White and his wife had two daughters, Victoria Vinton of Manhattan and Deborah, of Warwick, N.Y. Deborah Gail White followed her late father as publisher of The Scarsdale Inquirer. Victoria Ann married Thomas Cromwell Vinton in 1975.
