= George Washington Pilipō =

Hawaiian politician (1828–1887)

The Honourable George Washington Pilipō
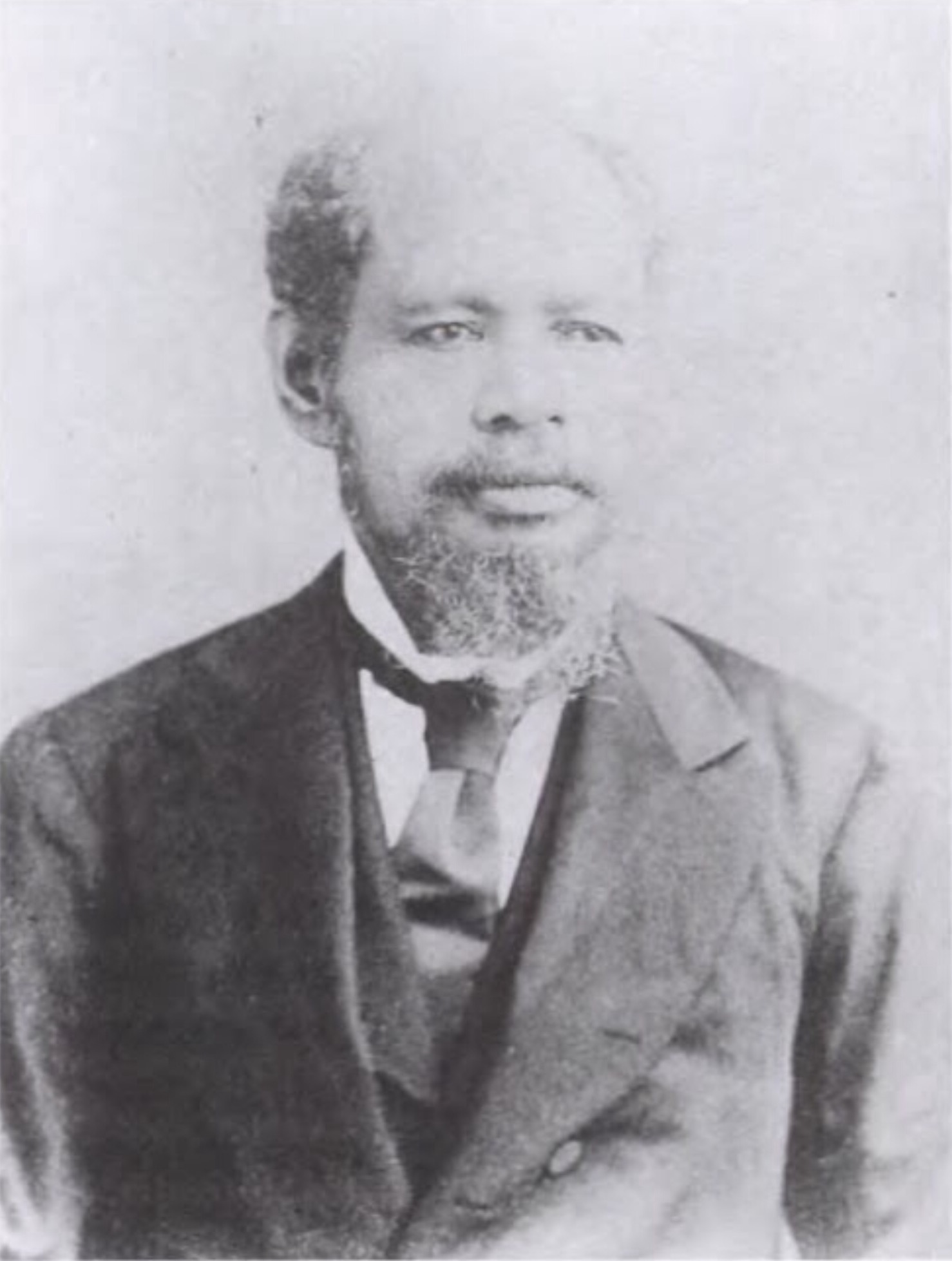

Member of the House of Representatives from North Kona
- In office 1860, 1868–1870, 1876–1884
- Succeeded by: J. K. Nahale

Personal details
- Born: February 22, 1828 Holualoa, North Kona, Hawaii, Kingdom of Hawaii
- Died: March 27, 1887 (aged 59) Pālama, Honolulu, Oahu
- Party: Queen Emma Party; Kuokoa
- Education: Hilo Boarding School; Lahainaluna Seminary
- Occupation: Politician, Reverend

George Washington Pilipō (February 22, 1828 – March 27, 1887) was a politician of the Kingdom of Hawaii. He served as a member of the House of Representative from North Kona (1860–1884) and Reverend of Kaumakapili Church. Considered one of the leading Hawaiian politicians of his generation, he was known as "Ka Liona o Kona Akau", or "The Lion of North Kona".

== Early life ==
Pilipō was born, on February 22, 1828, in Holualoa, North Kona, on the island of Hawaii. He had eleven siblings but only himself and another sibling survived to maturity. He was educated at the Hilo Boarding School and Lahainaluna School. After graduating in 1857, he worked as teacher and established a school in his home district for a time. One of his pupils was George W. Kanuha, who translated Jules Verne's 1870 novel Twenty Thousand Leagues Under the Seas into the Hawaiian language.

Pilipō was ordained in 1864 at the Mokuaikaua Church at Kailua-Kona and worked there for seven years as the assistant of Reverend Asa Thurston, who came to Hawaii with the first company of ABCFM missionaries in 1820. In 1871, he was appointed the pastor of Kaumakapili Church, the church for common people in Honolulu, succeeding Reverend Anderson Oliver Forbes. He served as a pastor until 1874 when he was succeeded by Moses Kuaea.

== Political career ==
Between 1860 and 1884, Pilipō was elected to serve as the House for his district in North Kona with a few non-consecutive gaps. He sat in on the legislative assemblies of 1860, 1868, 1870, 1876, 1878, 1880, 1882, and 1884. In his long political career, Pilipō served under the reigns of four monarchs: Kamehameha IV and Kamehameha V, Lunalilo and Kalākaua. During the 1874 election, following the death of Lunalilo, Pilipō, although not serving on the legislature at the time, actively supported and campaigned for the candidacy of Queen Emma of Hawaii against Kalākaua. He was suspected of being involved with the 1874 Honolulu Courthouse riot which occurred after Emma's defeat.

After the controversial election, Pilipō became a member of the Queen Emma Party and joined with Representative Joseph Nāwahī of Hilo in forming the native opposition against Kalākaua. In 1876, he and Nāwahī led the opposition to the Reciprocity Treaty of 1875, which they viewed as a step towards American annexation and only beneficial to the elite number of Euro-American businessmen at the expense of Native Hawaiian subsistence farmers. He was influential in bringing down the appointment of the Italian adventurer Celso Caesar Moreno as a cabinet minister in 1880. In the election of 1886, Kalākaua personally journeyed to the districts of Pilipō and Nāwahī, on Hawaii, and John William Kalua, on Maui, to sway the vote against these three politicians. This resulted in the electoral defeat of Pilipō in his home district of Kona.

According to the later testimony of Charles T. Gulick in the Blount Report, Pilipō and his contemporary Luther Aholo were considered "some of the brightest [native leaders] then living ... in the house". His prowess as a politician gained him the epithet of "Ka Liona o Kona Akau", "The Lion of North Kona". Pilipō and Nāwahī were given the moniker of "Nā Pū Kuni Ahi o ka ʻAhaʻōlelo" (the Cannons of the Legislature) for their steadfast defense of Hawaiian sovereignty.

== Death ==
Pilipō died on March 27, 1887, at his residence in the Pālama neighborhood of Honolulu. The cause of death was brain fever; he was fifty-nine years old. He was buried from the Kaumakapili Church and a memorial service was held at Kawaiahaʻo Church. Joseph Oliver Carter, who later became the personal secretary of Queen Liliuokalani, praised Pilipō as "one of the Hawaii's truest and stanchest friends."

== Bibliography ==
- Andrade, Ernest (1996). Unconquerable Rebel: Robert W. Wilcox and Hawaiian Politics, 1880–1903. Niwot, CO: University Press of Colorado. ISBN 978-0-87081-417-4. OCLC 247224388.
- Blount, James Henderson (1895). The Executive Documents of the House of Representatives for the Second Session of the Fifty-Third Congress, 1893–'94 in Thirty-One Volumes. Washington, DC: U.S. Government Printing Office. OCLC 191710879.
- Dabagh, Jean; Lyons, Curtis Jere; Hitchcock, Harvey Rexford (1974). Dabagh, Jean (ed.). "A King is Elected: One Hundred Years Ago" (PDF). The Hawaiian Journal of History. 8. Honolulu: Hawaiian Historical Society: 76–89. hdl:10524/112. OCLC 60626541.
- Damon, Ethel Moseley (1957). Sanford Ballard Dole and His Hawaii: With an Analysis of Justice Dole's Legal Opinions. Honolulu: Hawaiian Historical Society. OCLC 1633596. Archived from the original on 2017-12-22 – via Questia.
- Earle, David Williams (December 1993). Coalition Politics in Hawaiʻi· 1887–90: Hui Kālaiʻāina and the Mechanics and Workingmen's Political Protective Union (PDF) (Thesis). Honolulu: University of Hawaii at Manoa. hdl:10125/21097.
- Frear, Mary Dillingham (1938). "A Brief Record of Kaumakapili Church" (PDF). Forty-Sixth Annual Report of the Hawaiian Historical Society for the Year 1937. 46. Honolulu: Hawaiian Historical Society: 14–26. hdl:10524/82.
- Hawaii (1918). Lydecker, Robert Colfax (ed.). Roster Legislatures of Hawaii, 1841–1918. Honolulu: Hawaiian Gazette Company. OCLC 60737418.
- Hawkins, Richard A. (2011). Pacific Industry: The History of Pineapple Canning in Hawaii. London: I. B.Tauris. ISBN 978-0-85772-042-9. OCLC 772844818.
- Kaeo, Peter; Queen Emma (1976). Korn, Alfons L. (ed.). News from Molokai, Letters Between Peter Kaeo & Queen Emma, 1873–1876. Honolulu: The University Press of Hawaii. hdl:10125/39980. ISBN 978-0-8248-0399-5. OCLC 2225064.
- Kanahele, George S. (1999). Emma: Hawaii's Remarkable Queen. Honolulu: University of Hawaii Press. ISBN 978-0-8248-2240-8. OCLC 40890919.
- Kuykendall, Ralph Simpson (1967). The Hawaiian Kingdom 1874–1893, The Kalakaua Dynasty. Vol. 3. Honolulu: University of Hawaii Press. ISBN 978-0-87022-433-1. OCLC 500374815.
- Osorio, Jon Kamakawiwoʻole (2002). Dismembering Lāhui: A History of the Hawaiian Nation to 1887. Honolulu: University of Hawaii Press. ISBN 0-8248-2549-7. OCLC 48579247.
- Rossi, Pualiʻiliʻimaikalani (December 2013). No Ka Pono ʻOle O Ka Lehulehu: The 1874 Election of Hawaiʻi's Moʻi And The Kanaka Maoli Response (M.An thesis). Honolulu: University of Hawaii at Manoa. hdl:10125/100744.
- Silva, Noenoe K. (2004). Aloha Betrayed: Native Hawaiian Resistance to American Colonialism. Durham: Duke University Press. ISBN 0-8223-8622-4. OCLC 191222123.
- Van Dyke, Jon M. (2008). Who Owns the Crown Lands of Hawaiʻi?. Honolulu: University of Hawaii Press. ISBN 978-0-8248-6560-3. OCLC 257449971 – via Project MUSE.
