= Queen Emma Party =

The Queen Emma Party or short name the Queen's Party or the Emma Party was a political party in the Kingdom of Hawaii. The Queen's Party was created by supporters of Queen Emma for the Royal Election of 1874. Members were referred to as "Queenites" or "Emmaites". After her defeat, the party continue to exist and oppose King Kalakaua even though Queen Emma herself recognized him as the new monarch; she ceased to associate with the party or its actions after the election. In the summer of 1874 members of the party attempted a revolution with assistance from the French in dethroning Kalakaua and placing Queen Emma on the throne, which ultimately failed. The Party was Pro-British, Anti-American, they opposed the Reciprocity Treaty of 1875 with the United States. Emma had been active in developing relations between Hawaii and Great Britain.

== British v. American ==
For more than half a century before the creation of the Queen Emma Party there had been a long-standing feud between the two main haole groups, the British merchants and the American missionaries. In some sense, the Queen Emma Party was a political extension of this feud because it had attracted British descendants to campaign against the Missionary Party which was generally composed of American descendants.

== Last of the Emmaites ==
The three Emmaite representatives of the Hawaiian Legislative Assembly were called the "Last of the Emmaites" when the Queen Emma Party dissolved after the elections of 1882.

- Joseph Nawahi Representative from Hilo- Operated Ke Aloha Aina newspaper and involved in the Royalist insurgency in 1895.
- George Washington Pilipō Representative from Kona- Reverend of Kaumakapili Church.
- Kapahei "Judge" Kauai Representative from Kauai-Contracted leprosy and was the leader of the leper colony during the Leper War.
