= National Party (Hawaii) =

Hawaiian National Party
- Founded: 1873
- Headquarters: Honolulu, Hawaii
- Ideology: Kalākauan royalism; Nationalism; Nativism; Centralism

The Hawaiian National Party also known as the Young Hawaiian Party, King's Party or Government Party was a political party in Hawaii under King David Kalākaua, formed to support him in the event of a second election held after the death of Lunalilo.

Lunalilo's death led to the Royal Election of 1874. Queen Emma and her party, the Queen Emma Party, unsuccessfully ran against Kalākaua. Following his win in the election, Kalākaua put members of his party in appointed positions and they were a powerful bloc in the kingdom's legislature. The party emphasized central authority, expanded foreign relations, and a nationalism that stimulated what became known as the First Hawaiian Renaissance. The party was usually associated with government workers.
