= Achi =

Achi may refer to:

- Achi language, a Mayan language
- Achi people, a Maya people in Guatemala

In places:

- Achí, Bolívar a municipality in Colombia
- Achi, Nagano, a village in Japan
- Achi, Jalal-Abad, a village in Kyrgyzstan
- Achi (Nigeria), a town in Enugu State, Nigeria
- Achi, Ozurgeti Municipality, a village in Georgia
  - Achi Monastery, a medieval church near the village

In other uses:

- Achi (game), an abstract strategy game
- Australasian College of Health Informatics, a professional organisation
- Australian Classification of Health Interventions, the system used to code inpatient episodes of care in Australian hospitals
- Achi, flour produced from the seeds of Brachystegia eurycoma

== People with the name ==
- Astrid Achi (1961–2023), Ecuadorian operatic soprano
- William Charles Achi (1858–1928), Hawaiian lawyer and politician
- William Charles Achi, Jr. (1889–1947), Hawaiian attorney and territorial judge
- Achi Brandt (born 1938), Israeli mathematician

== See also ==
- Rabinal Achí, a Mayan theatrical play
- Advanced Host Controller Interface (AHCI)
