= Samuel K. Pua =

American lawyer

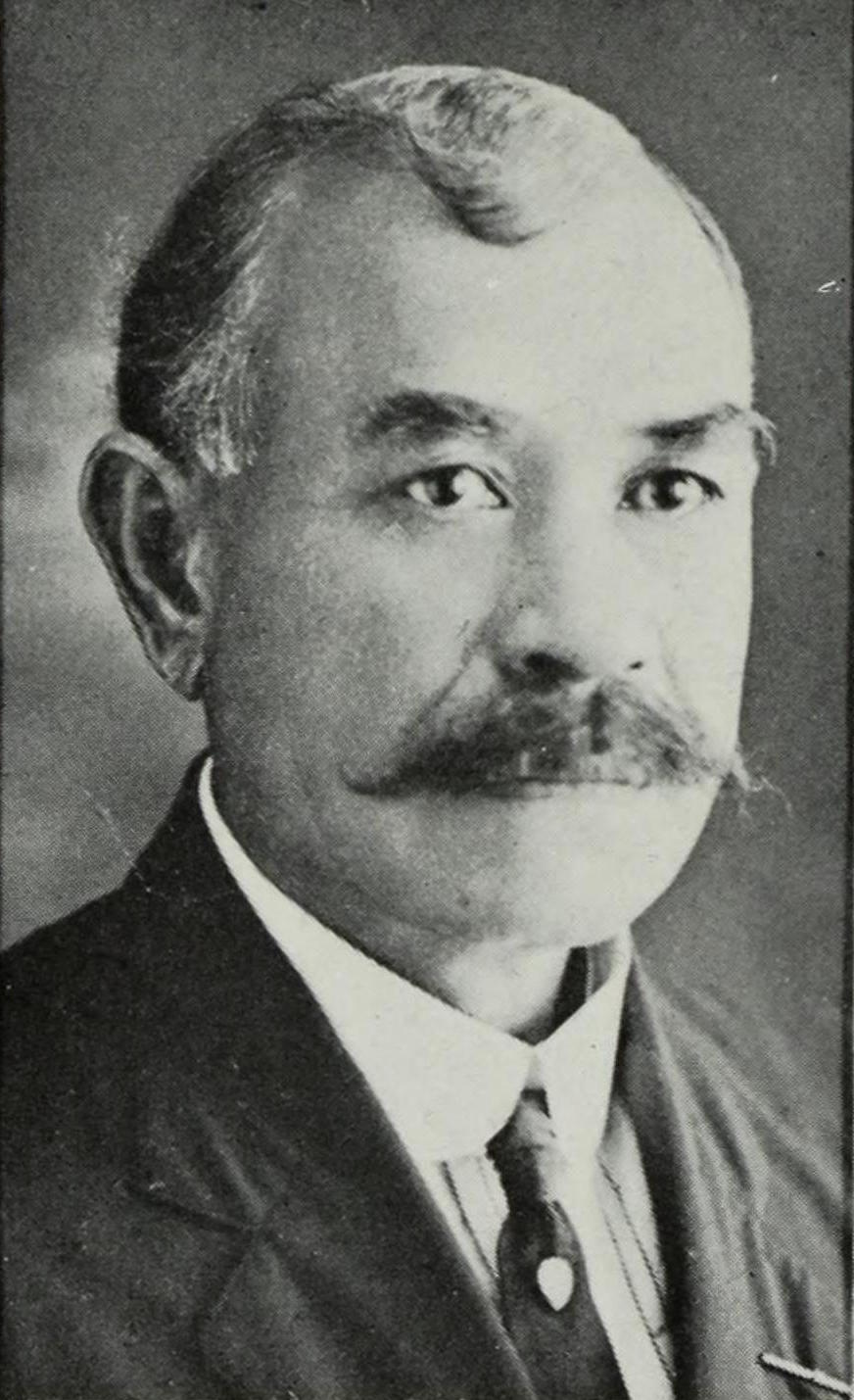

Member of the Kingdom of Hawaii House of Representatives for the Fifth Ward of Honolulu, Oahu
- In office May 28, 1892 – January 14, 1893

Sheriff of Hawaii County, Territory of Hawaii

Personal details
- Born: Samuel Kaholoʻokalani Pua; October 27, 1867
- Died: August 1, 1932 (aged 64)
- Party: National Liberal
- Spouse(s): Adelaide K. Wiltse; Elizabeth K. Ahu Waiolama
- Children: Ruby K. Pua
- Parent(s): David William Pua and Mary Nahakuelua Pua
- Occupation: Politician, Newspaper Editor, Lawyer, Sheriff

Samuel Kaholoʻokalani Pua (October 27, 1867 – August 1, 1932) was a Native Hawaiian politician, newspaper editor, lawyer and sheriff of Hawaii. He served as a legislator during the last years of the Kingdom of Hawaii and worked as an assistant editor for the anti-annexationist newspaper Ke Ahailono o Hawaii (translated as The Hawaiian Herald) run by members of Hui Kālaiʻāina (Hawaiian Political Association), after the overthrow of the monarchy. After the annexation, he became a sheriff during the Territory of Hawaii.

== Early life ==
Samuel Kaholoʻokalani Pua was born, in Honolulu, on October 27, 1867, the eldest son of David William Pua (1836–1896) and Mary Nahakuelua Pua (1832–1922). His father, the namesake for Pua Lane in Honolulu, was a member of the House of Nobles on the Legislature of the Kingdom of Hawaii. He was educated at the Royal School in Honolulu.

== Political career ==
In the election of 1892, Sam Pua ran as candidate for the newly created National Liberal party, for a seat in the House of Representatives of the Legislature for the fifth Ward of Honolulu, on the island of Oahu. He defeated Independent candidate S. Paaluhi, National Reformer J. Kahoonei and Native Sons of Hawaii candidate William Charles Achi for this seat in the House of Representatives. The Liberal party advocated for a constitutional convention to draft a new constitution to replace the unpopular Bayonet Constitution. However, the party was divided between radicals and more conciliatory groups. His father David William Pua also served on the same legislature in the House of Nobles.

From May 28, 1892 to January 14, 1893, the legislature of the Kingdom convened for an unprecedented 171 days, which later historian Albertine Loomis dubbed the "Longest Legislature". This session was characterized by a series of resolutions of want of confidence ousting a number of Queen Liliʻuokalani's appointed cabinet ministers and debates over the passage of the controversial lottery and opium bills. The conflict with the queen's cabinet was rooted in another contention over the retention of Marshal Charles Burnett Wilson, a favorite of the queen, referred to as "King Bolabola" by his opponents. The part-Tahitian officer was extremely unpopular with the legislators especially the Liberals since many party members including Robert William Wilcox were arrested by Marshal Wilson for conspiracy before the opening of the assembly in May. Since Marshal Wilson was under the jurisdiction of the Attorney General, one of the four minister forming the cabinet, the Liberal legislators were keen on voting out any cabinets which continued to condone him while the queen insisted on retaining him. On August 30, 1892, Representative Pua submitted a resolution for the removal of Marshal Wilson by the ministry led by Hermann A. Widemann. The preamble of the resolution read:

Whereas, the present Marshal of the Kingdom, C. B. Wilson, has allowed gambling, opium dealing and other forms of law-breaking to flourish unchecked, and the Police Department under his administration has shown more disposition to affiliate with criminals than to enforce the laws of this Kingdom..and whereas, the said Marshal is commonly reported to exercise a pernicious, illegitimate and occult influence at the Court of Her Majesty the Queen, which tends to bring Her Majesty's Government into contempt and disrepute.

The failure of the Widemann cabinet to fulfill the expectations of the legislature (one of them being the removal of Wilson) led to their removal in September becoming the first of four cabinets to be ousted during the session. Marshal Wilson was not removed by any of the subsequent cabinets.

Following the proroguing of the legislature and the unsuccessful attempts of the queen to promulgate a new constitution, the monarchy was overthrow on January 17, 1893. After a brief transition under the Provisional Government, the oligarchical Republic of Hawaii was established on July 4, 1894. During this period, the de facto government, which was composed largely of residents of American and European ancestry, sought to annex the islands to the United States against the wish of the Native Hawaiians who wanted to remain an independent nation and for the monarchy to continue. Pua and his father actively protest against the new de facto government. His father was a member of Hui Aloha ʻĀina (Hawaiian Patriotic League).

During the 1895 Counter-revolution in Hawaii, Pua helped transport weapons to the Royalists and commanded a squad of men during the fighting. The rebellion led by Robert William Wilcox was aimed at overthrowing the Republic and reinstating the queen. Pua was arrested on January 11 along with many other Royalists and during the trial, he was described as "the long-hair rebel" because his hair was kept uncut during his imprisonment. He was sentenced to five years in prison and to pay $5000 in fine, although President Sanford B. Dole would issue full pardons for all the rebels in 1896.

== Editor of Ke Ahailono o Hawaii ==
In 1897, Pua became the assistant editor of Ke Ahailono o Hawaii (translated as The Hawaiian Herald), a Hawaiian language newspaper founded by Hui Kālaiʻāina. The Hui Kālaiʻāina (Hawaiian Political Association) was a Hawaiian patriotic group founded after 1887 to oppose the Bayonet Constitution and later switched its political agenda toward opposing annexation to the United States and restoring Liliʻuokalani. The main editor was William Pūnohu White who had been the leading National Liberal of the legislature in 1892–1893.

The paper was published at Honolulu's Makaainana Printing House, owned by Francisco Jose Testta, and the first weekly issue was published on June 4, 1897. At its conception, the English newspaper The Independent noted that "The New venture under the control of Messrs. White and Pua, should indeed be a White Flower of journalism, although the genial 'Sam' could change the euphony by adding another terminal vowel to his." In July 1897, he was gored in the thigh by a billy goat at Waikiki and severely injured by the incident. He would resign as assistant editor on October of the same year. The newspapers ended publications on October 29.

== Personal and later life ==
Hawaii was annexed by the United States in 1898 and the Territory of Hawaii was established afterward. From 1898 to 1905, Pua worked in farming and ranching at Parker Ranch on the island of Hawaii. He started studying law and was admitted to district courts of Hawaii. In 1903, he was elected the county clerk for West Hawaii County, created during the second Territorial legislature. He served for only fourteen days until the County Act was declared unconstitutional. From 1903 to 1905, he practiced law in Kona. He was elected county clerk of Hawaii County in 1908 and became the sheriff of Hawaii County stationed at Hilo. He served as sheriff for twenty-one years. After a long illness, he died on August 1, 1932. He was buried at the Homelani Memorial Park in Hilo.

He married Adelaide K. Wiltse on December 25, 1889, who died in 1919. They had one child Ruby K. Pua. After his wife's death, he remarried to Elizabeth K. Waiolama, on February 14, 1920.

== Bibliography ==
- Blount, James Henderson (1895). The Executive Documents of the House of Representatives for the Third Session of the Fifty-Third Congress, 1893–'94 in Thirty-Five Volumes. Washington, DC: U.S. Government Printing Office. OCLC 191710879.
- Chapin, Helen G. (2000). Guide to Newspapers of Hawaiʻi: 1834–2000. Honolulu: Hawaiian Historical Society. hdl:10524/1444. OCLC 45330644.
- Hawaii (1918). Lydecker, Robert Colfax (ed.). Roster Legislatures of Hawaii, 1841–1918. Honolulu: Hawaiian Gazette Company. OCLC 60737418.
- Kuykendall, Ralph Simpson (1967). The Hawaiian Kingdom 1874–1893, The Kalakaua Dynasty. Vol. 3. Honolulu: University of Hawaii Press. ISBN 978-0-87022-433-1. OCLC 500374815.
- Loomis, Albertine (1963). "The Longest Legislature" (PDF). Seventy-First Annual Report of the Hawaiian Historical Society for the Year 1962. 71. Honolulu: Hawaiian Historical Society: 7–27. hdl:10524/35.
- Pukui, Mary Kawena; Elbert, Samuel H.; Mookini, Esther T. (1974). Place Names of Hawaii. Honolulu: University of Hawaii Press. p. 81. ISBN 978-0-8248-0524-1. OCLC 1042464.
- Reinecke, John E. (1996). The Filipino Piecemeal Sugar Strike of 1924–1925. Honolulu: University of Hawaii Press. ISBN 978-0-8248-1896-8. OCLC 35762625.
- Siddall, John William (1917). Men of Hawaii. Vol. 1. Honolulu: Honolulu Star-Bulletin. OCLC 16326675.
- Siddall, John William (1921). Men of Hawaii. Vol. 2. Honolulu: Honolulu Star-Bulletin. OCLC 16326675.
- Silva, Noenoe K. (2004). Aloha Betrayed: Native Hawaiian Resistance to American Colonialism. Durham: Duke University Press. ISBN 0-8223-8622-4. OCLC 191222123.
- Towse, Edward (1895). The Rebellion of 1895: A Complete History of the Insurrection Against the Republic of Hawaii: List of Officers and Members of the National Guard of Hawaii and the Citizen's Guard. Honolulu: The Hawaiian Star. OCLC 16334257.
