= McCants Stewart =

American lawyer (1877–1919)

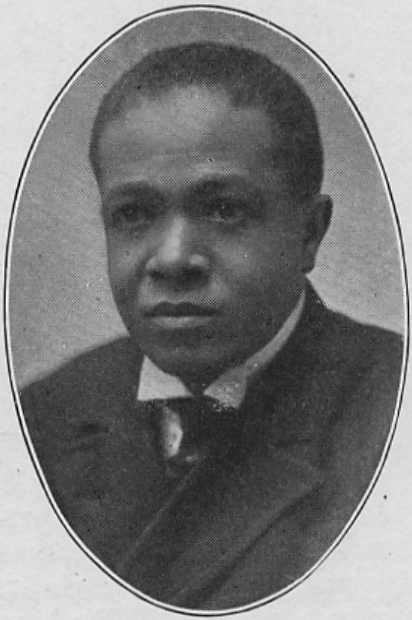
- Born: July 11, 1877; Brooklyn, New York
- Died: April 14, 1919 (aged 41); San Francisco, California
- Education: Tuskegee Institute; New York University; University of Minnesota Law School
- Occupation: Lawyer
- Known for: Oregon's first African American lawyer
- Political party: Republican
- Spouse: Mayme Delia Weir
- Children: Mary Katherine Stewart
- Parent(s): T. McCants Stewart; Charlotte L. Harris Stewart

McCants Stewart (July 11, 1877 – April 14, 1919) was an African-American lawyer. Born to a prominent attorney in New York, Stewart studied law in Minnesota and became the first African American lawyer in the state of Oregon. His lack of financial success in Oregon led him to eventually move to San Francisco, where failing vision led him to commit suicide. Living in the era of Plessy v. Ferguson and "separate but equal" doctrine, his life was said to "reflect an unyielding commitment to the principle of justice for all powerless people in the northwest."

== Biography ==
=== Early years ===
Born in Brooklyn, New York, Stewart was the eldest son of T. McCants Stewart (1853–1923), a noted black lawyer, civil rights leader and confidant of Booker T. Washington, whose career took him from South Carolina to New York City, Hawaii, London to serving as an Associate Justice of the Liberian Supreme Court, and Charlotte L. Harris Stewart, herself a graduate of Wilberforce University. His father's friendship with Washington began before the latter rose to national prominence with the 1895 Atlanta Compromise speech, and the elder Stewart embraced Washington's principles of thrift, self-help and moral reform, instilling those values on his three children at an early age. His brother, Gilchrist, would also become and attorney and his sister, Carlotta Stewart Lai, would help develop Hawaii's public education system. Stewart attended public schools in New York.

At age sixteen, and at their father's request, Stewart and his brother enrolled at Washington's Tuskegee Institute in Alabama in 1893. In its twelfth year, the black college stressed industrial education with strong principles of self-reliance in a strict environment. Stewart did not immediately accept the school's rigid structure, and rebelled in ways that brought the increasing displeasure of Washington. The conflict came to a head in July 1894, as the school council voted to expel Stewart from the institution. In October 1894, and with Margaret Murray Washington's intervention, he was readmitted. Back at school, he studied piano and voice, but his main interest became debate, where he became known for his considerable skill. He graduated in 1896.

Immediately after finishing at Tuskegee, Stewart moved to New York and enrolled at New York University, where he earned a law certificate in 1896 and worked as a legal assistant in his father's law office. A strong follower of Washington's principles, Stewart's father operated his office and his business relationship with his son under strict guidelines. He required that his son sign a contract which specified his employment and compensation in detail, noting that "my intention is to pay you $3 per week to cover your fare, lunches; allow you 5% of all my fees; at 21, I shall make you Notary Public and put your name on the door."

=== Minnesota ===
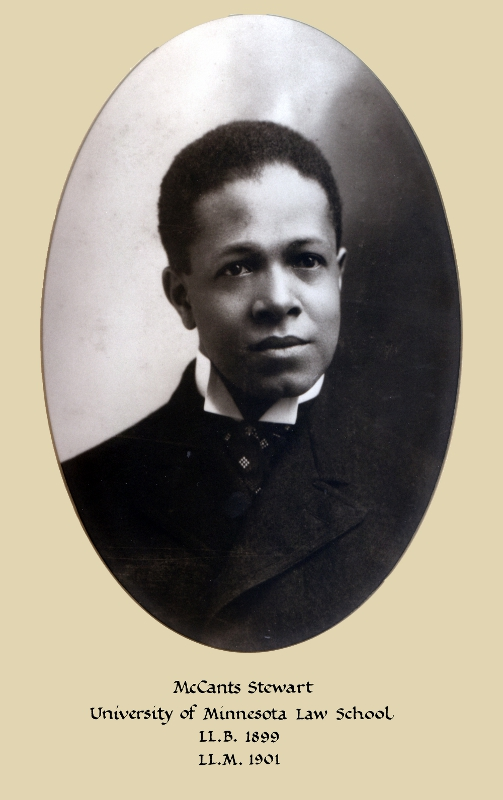
This c. 1901 image of Stewart is on display in the University of Minnesota Law Library, and notes the two degrees he received at the Law School.

After a year of working under his father, Stewart grew tired of the strict arrangement and moved to Minneapolis, Minnesota to attend the University of Minnesota Law School. His reason for choosing a northern school in a state with a small black population was never revealed, however the change in environment gave Stewart a new sense of purpose and maturity. Unlike his years at Tuskegee, he was a model graduate student in Minnesota: he excelled academically, wrote from the school newspaper and was an active member of a literary society. He again participated in a debate society, and was elected secretary of the senior class and sheriff of the moot court, officiating all moot court sessions at the school. During his senior year, his fellow Tuskegee alumnus and University of Minnesota Law student Jay Moses Griffin recruited him to work as business manager of a local newspaper, the Twin-City American. He later served in the same position for the Afro-American Advance, becoming a visible figure in the black community.

During his time at the Law School, Stewart challenged discrimination from a Minneapolis restaurant that refused to serve him a meal because of his race. Several other patrons observed the incident and left their names with Stewart, who filed an administrative complaint with the Minneapolis City Attorney's Office under the recently passed 1897 state civil rights law. After an investigation, the office filed the first prosecution under the law, charging the owner with violating Stewart's civil rights. The owner had previously served black patrons, but once their numbers had risen his white customers dropped off; once he made objections to the black patrons, they also left him. The trial was well attended, and the jury needed only fifteen minutes of deliberation to convict the owner on the charges.

Stewart received an LL.B. in 1899. That June, alongside his classmates, Stewart was sworn into the state bar by Minnesota Supreme Court Chief Justice Charles M. Start. He set up a legal practice in the Twin Cities, however he also continued working for the newspapers to help finance his continuing education at the Law School. It was during this time he met his future wife, Mary Delia "Mayme" Weir of Minneapolis, who was a student at the University of Minnesota. Noted as an excellent orator, he was invited to give testimonials as well as participate in public debates on race issues. In 1901, he became the first African American to receive an LL.M. from the University of Minnesota Law School.

In the years immediately following his graduation, Stewart continued to make his home in Minneapolis and speak to crowds in the Twin Cities. An active member of the Republican Party, he was elected Secretary of the Hennepin County Republican Club in 1902. However, he began testing the market out west and by March 1904 he had decided that it made more business sense to practice law elsewhere and decided to permanently move to Portland, Oregon. He returned to Minneapolis several times after moving, most notably to marry on August 22, 1905. His wife was a graduate of the University of Minnesota and a music school, and had been a teacher in the Minneapolis public school system. Their wedding, held in Minneapolis, was called "the most notable event of the week in social circles" of the city's black community. Their only child, daughter Mary Katherine, was born a year later.

=== Oregon ===
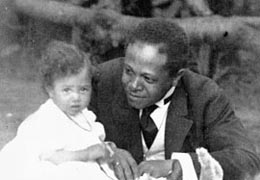
Stewart with his daughter, 1907.

Stewart began spending time in Oregon in 1903. He was allowed to represent clients in local Portland courts before passing the bar examination, and was assigned as the public defender in a few cases in 1903. Like the Twin Cities, Portland's black community was small when Stewart permanently settled there in 1904. Most African Americans were service workers or unskilled, menial laborers, though there were some black-owned businesses. Stewart's father was disappointed in his son's decision to move to Portland, noting "But for the life of me, I can't see why you are 'using up' your life where you are", suggesting his son try moving abroad like he had. Stewart disregarded the advice and remained in Oregon, and was the first African American admitted to the state bar on March 1, 1901.

After setting up his office in Portland, Stewart struggled to make a decent living. The black population of Oregon remained below 1% of the state's total population until World War II. Race relations of the time dictated that white Oregonians rarely hired black attorneys, and the even smaller number of educated, wealthy blacks did not offer much of a market. Stewart also took on Japanese clients. His wife did not work, nor did the couple own property; he earned most of his money from small legal fees. Stewart did earn the respect of his legal colleagues; among them, Oregon Supreme Court Associate Justice Henry L. Benson wrote that he "has established an exceptional record for industry and ability as a lawyer and his work before the Supreme Court has been commendable." Stewart had been the first African American lawyer to argue a case before the Oregon Supreme Court in State v. Browning (1905). In the case, he challenged the Portland Municipal Police Court's jurisdiction over a matter of state law. Though the court ruled against him, it did so with difficulty and the case drew Stewart positive attention and respect.

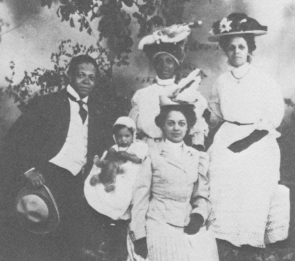
1907 photo of (from left to right) McCants Stewart, his daughter Mary Katherine Stewart, sister Carlotta Stewart Lai (standing), wife Mayme Delia Weir (seated), and sister-in-law Harriett Anna Weir.

The highlight of his legal career was his successful argument of the 1906 civil rights case of Taylor v. Cohn. The case involved Oliver Taylor, a black Pullman car porter, who was required to sit in the balcony at a Portland theater. When informed that the theater prohibited the seating of blacks on the main floor, the plaintiff refused to exchange his tickets and sued the owner for $5000. Stewart argued that protecting the rights of blacks against discrimination was accepted as a matter of public policy, despite Oregon's lack of a civil rights bill. At the time, Oregon was more racially progressive than other western states, with state law not segregating schools, housing or public accommodations; though interracial marriage was prohibited. The state's largest newspaper, The Oregonian, sided with the theater owner's right to exclude any race from its premises; it editorialized that "Colored people are wise to accept conditions that they cannot change or control, and go their way cheerfully", further asserting that "it is a well known fact" that whites objected to sitting next to blacks. In his brief, Stewart argued that "We have always regarded our rights in every respect to have been secure. So well founded has been our belief until we regard that legislation, known as civil rights laws, which has been enacted in other states, to be unnecessary." The trial court dismissed the case as groundless, but Stewart appealed. The Oregon Supreme Court agreed with Stewart, and awarded Taylor a favorable judgment.

The successful case did not result in a boom in business, and Stewart continued to struggle financially. To try to broaden his income, he purchased stock in a number of companies, but none were successful. Stewart continued to participate in efforts to improve the black community in Portland, helping found The Advocate, Portland's second oldest black newspaper. When his own law office burned down in 1908, that newspaper allowed him to use their offices until his building was restored.

A 1907 case highlighted the racism that a black attorney garnered from the white press: a white woman accused Stewart's black client of defamation after alleging he propositioned her on the street. His client was called racial slurs in the press, which also described his cross-examination as "subject(ing) [the accuser] to the humiliating questions of a black lawyer who defended the black act of his black client in a black way, viz, by again insulting the [white] girl." Stewart did not shy away from speaking out against the oppression of blacks in the South as well as the lynchings taking place throughout the country. In 1914, he publicly criticized President Woodrow Wilson's failure to halt lynchings.

Stewart's life was seriously affected by physical problems. On April 22, 1909, Stewart was in a streetcar accident: he slipped while running to board which caused his leg to be mangled severely, necessitating the amputation of his left leg below the knee. He began using a prosthetic leg made out of cork. His vision then began to fail, causing him to fear he might lose his sight. These issues caused him to rely on charity for a brief period, but he then resumed practice to support his family.

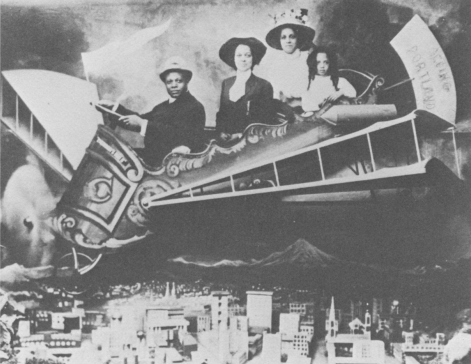
A 1910 photo of Stewart, his wife, sister-in-law and daughter.

In September 1911, while walking home from a banquet, Stewart stopped at a restaurant to greet some friends inside. As he stood in the doorway, a Portland Police officer ordered him to move on and threatened to arrest him if he refused to comply. Believing he had done no wrong, Stewart objected and the policeman arrested him and made him walk a mile on his prosthetic leg to the police station where he was booked for drunkenness. Authorities refused to charge Stewart, and the next day he filed a complaint of assault and battery with the district attorney, who issued an arrest warrant against the officer. At the hearing the officer maintained that Stewart was very inebriated while Stewart produced numerous witnesses from the banquet arguing the opposite. The complaint was dismissed and Stewart appealed to the Mayor of Portland and publicized the incident in The Oregon Journal. Whether there was any further action is unknown.

Stewart tried to use his wide number of contacts in the Oregon political and legal community to gain a political appointment, securing letters of recommendation from a number of important members of the legal and ecclesiastical communities. Still an active Republican, his support was solicited by members of the party of all races. However, the small black population kept Stewart from significant success, as he only received a commission as a notary public. Democratic Governor George Earle Chamberlain appointed him as Oregon's representative to the 1908 National Negro Fair in Mobile, Alabama, where he gave a keynote address. He was then appointed by Chamberlain as chief commissioner to the National Emancipation Commemoration Society, organized by President William Howard Taft in 1909. In 1914 he tried to become Portland's public defender, but did not succeed. In 1916, he lobbied the Oregon State Legislature to repeal anachronistic and unenforced sections of the Oregon constitution that denied suffrage and basic property rights to blacks. Despite support from The Oregonian, the effort failed.

Stewart's lack of success in Portland led him to move to San Francisco in 1917. He did not find his departure from Portland to be particularly difficult, writing that "The business was not there—I stuck to it—lived in debt—starved and worried but it was not there." He blamed the economy of the region, though did not explicitly cite the racial prejudices that kept white clients from hiring black lawyers. He had trouble with both races: whites considered him a lawyer of "colored people" and did nothing to help him, while blacks frequently neglected to pay his fees, which included an instance in 1917 where Stewart had to sue a black church for services rendered in successfully protecting it from a condemnation proceeding. His departure left Portland without an African American attorney.

=== San Francisco ===
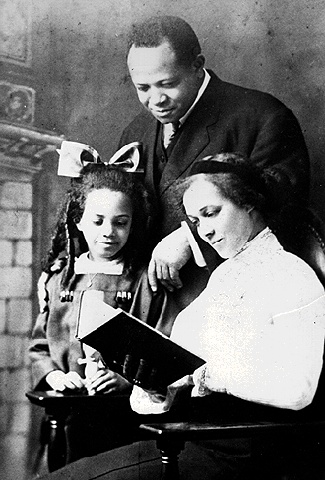
McCants Stewart and his family in 1919.

As he prepared to move to California, Stewart received a number of letters of praise and commendation, as well as references. Among them, Oregon Governor James Withycombe sent a letter to California Governor William Stephens which introduced and praised Stewart. A number of members of the Oregon judiciary also wrote him recommendations. Thus, despite arriving alone and broke, Stewart arrived in California optimistic that he could succeed and soon formed a partnership with Oscar Hudson, a respected black attorney.

A few months after moving to San Francisco, Stewart had to return to Oregon to close his office, bring his family to California and finish the appeal of his final Oregon case, Allen v. People's Amusement Co. Just like Taylor eleven years earlier, the case involved a black patron denied seating in the white section of a Portland theater despite his purchase of a general admissions ticket. Before the Oregon Supreme Court, Stewart argued the same theory. However, despite the nearly indistinguishable facts, the court ignored Taylor and ruled for the theater's decision to segregate itself. Thus, after his final case in Oregon, the condition of public accommodation of African Americans was no better than when he first arrived.

Upon returning to California, Stewart's optimism for San Francisco was short lived: despite the larger black professional class, there was little affluence and even more racial segregation than in Portland. His legal partnership with Hudson struggled financially, but the two remained committed to it. Ultimately, Stewart gave in to pressure. On April 14, 1919, unable to read his morning newspaper and fearing that he was about to go blind, Stewart wrote a note of farewell and shot himself in the head in his office. His body was found the following day by a business associate. His suicide note said: "I am going blind. My sight is gone. I can't see to read. Poor Mac. I can't stand it any longer, so I cashed in."

== Legacy ==
Stewart achieved several firsts for African Americans: he was the first to become an Oregon lawyer, the first to argue and the first to win a case before the Oregon Supreme Court, and the first to receive an LL.M. from the University of Minnesota Law School.

Although Stewart followed many of Booker T. Washington's philosophies of self-reliance, industriousness and good citizenship, he also differed by actively advocating for civil rights for African Americans in an era when discrimination was high. Despite this difference and his early discipline issues at the Tuskegee Institute, Washington cited Stewart in a letter as a model citizen and "a Tuskegee graduate who has a good reputation, stands high in his profession and is succeeding." In 1988, the University of Minnesota Law School awarded a Mary and McCants Stewart Foundation scholarship. During its inauguration, J. Clay Smith, Jr., former dean of the Howard University School of Law, noted that "Despite the ominous shadow of segregation, Stewart refused to sacrifice his principles at the expense of his clients or to derogate his beliefs." The respect he gained from his legal colleagues and the judiciary, including former opposing counsel such as those in Taylor, testify to his legal mind and character.

Stewart's daughter would marry Robert B. Flippin, a correctional counselor at San Quentin State Prison, reporter for the San Francisco Chronicle and activist with the National Association for the Advancement of Colored People (NAACP) as well as other organizations. Mary Katherine Stewart-Flippin donated her family's papers, including those of her grandfather T. McCants Stewart, her father, and her husband to Howard University. She gave interviews regarding her relatives well into the 1980s.

== See also ==
- List of first minority male lawyers and judges in Oregon
