= David William Pua =

Hawaiian politician (1836-1896)

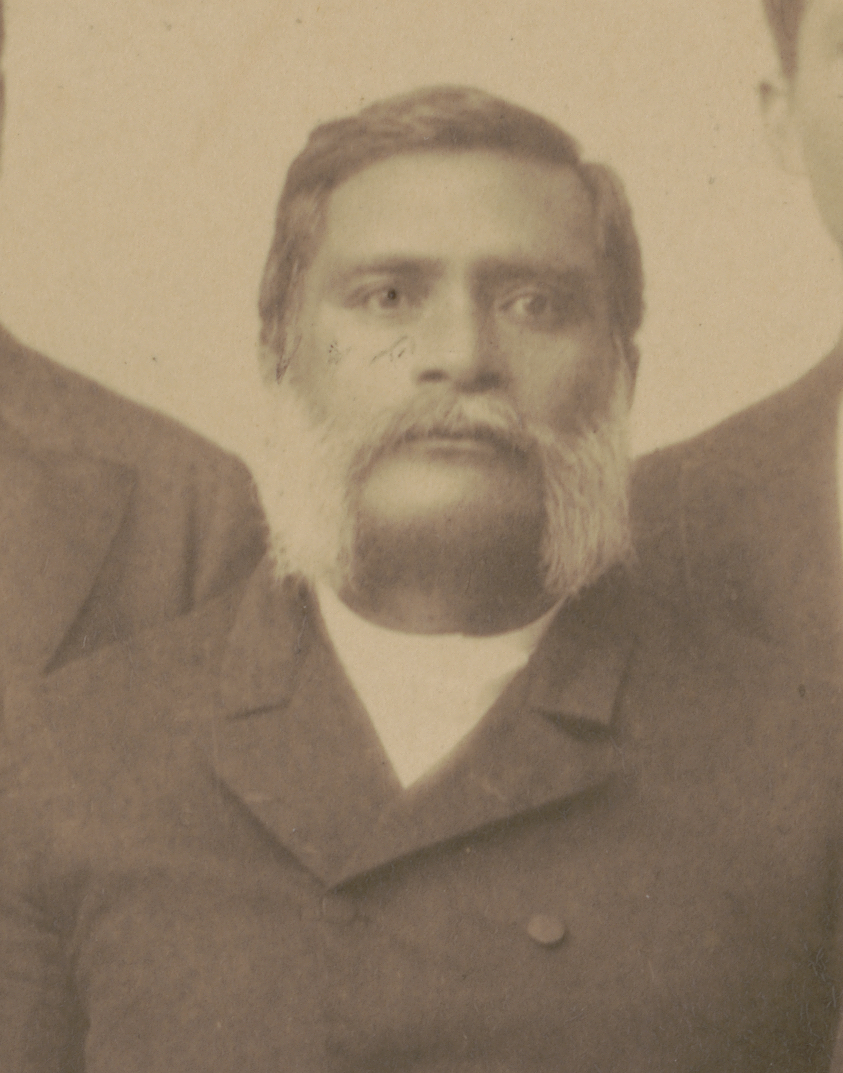

Member of the Kingdom of Hawaii House of Nobles for the island of Oahu
- In office 1890–1893

Personal details
- Born: David William Pua c. 1836 Niihau, Kingdom of Hawaii
- Died: October 13, 1896 Honolulu, Oahu, Kingdom of Hawaii
- Resting place: Honolulu Catholic Cemetery
- Party: National Reform; National Liberal
- Spouse: Mary Nahakuelua
- Children: Samuel K. Pua and 3 others
- Occupation: Politician, Businessman

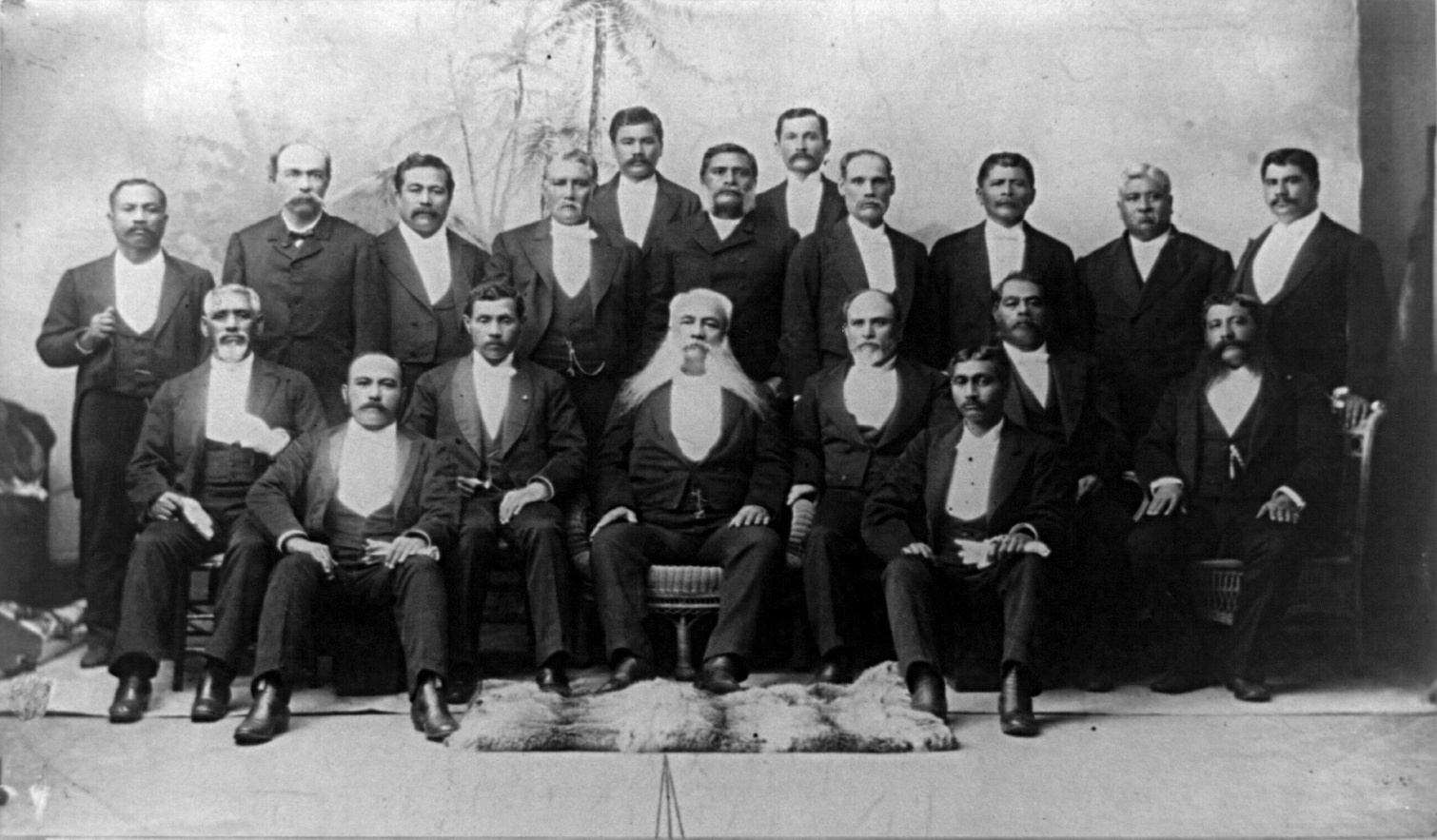
Committee members, selected to present a memorial to U.S. Special Commissioner, James H. Blount. D. W. Pua is standing in the center

David William Pua (c. 1836 – October 13, 1896), also known as D. W. Pua, was a politician during the Kingdom of Hawaii. He served as a legislator during the last years of the Legislature of the Kingdom of Hawaii and became a member of the Hui Aloha ʻĀina (Hawaiian Patriotic League), founded after the overthrow of the monarchy to protest attempts of annexation to the United States.

== Life ==
He was born c. 1836, on the island of Niihau. He married Mary Nahakuelua (1832–1922) on Niihau in March 1867, and settled in Honolulu on the island of Oahu after the marriage. The couple had two sons: Samuel K. Pua (1867–1932) and William K. Pua and two daughters: Mele Pua, later Mrs. Vivichaves, and Susan Pua, later Mrs. John Henry Nye. His eldest son Sam later served on the legislative assembly with his father. In Honolulu, Pua worked as a businessman and owned property and a large homestead in the Palama area of Honolulu.

Pua ran unsuccessfully for a seat in the House of Representatives, the lower house of the legislature, in 1884. After the signing of the Bayonet Constitution in 1887, membership in the House of Nobles, the upper house of the legislature, was changed from the traditional life-appointments to limited elected terms. In the election of 1890, Pua ran and was elected to the House of Nobles for a four-year term. He sat in the legislative assemblies of 1890 during the reign of King Kalākaua and during the 1892–93 session under his successor Queen Liliʻuokalani. In July 1891, Pua with other legislators and dignitaries accompanied the queen on her customary royal tour of the island of Kauai. He was a member of the Hawaiian National Reform Party in the 1890 election and possibly became a National Liberal in 1892, although he was listed as a National in the later Blount Report in 1893.

From May 28, 1892 to January 14, 1893, the legislature of the Kingdom convened for an unprecedented 171 days, which later historian Albertine Loomis dubbed the "Longest Legislature". This session was characterized by a series of resolutions of want of confidence ousting a number of Queen Liliʻuokalani's appointed cabinet ministers, debates over the passage of the controversial lottery and opium bills and also attempts to replace the unpopular Bayonet Constitution by means of a constitutional convention. During this session, Pua was one of the legislators to submit petitions from the people requesting a new constitution.

Following the proroguing of the legislature and the unsuccessful attempts of the queen to promulgate a new constitution, the monarchy was overthrown on January 17, 1893. After a brief transition under the Provisional Government, the oligarchical Republic of Hawaii was established on July 4, 1894. During this period, the de facto government, which was composed largely of residents of American and European ancestry, sought to annex the islands to the United States against the wish of the Native Hawaiians who wanted to remain an independent nation and for the monarchy to continue. Pua and his son Sam protested against the new de facto government. He became an executive member of Hui Aloha ʻĀina (Hawaiian Patriotic League), a patriotic group founded to protest the attempt of Hawaiian annexation to the United States, and represented the case of the monarchy and the Hawaiian people to the United States Commissioner James H. Blount who was sent by President Grover Cleveland to investigate the overthrow. His son was arrested and convicted of treason during the unsuccessful 1895 Counter-revolution of Hawaii to restore the monarchy.

Pua retired from politics around this time. He died unexpectedly, in his sleep, at his Palama residence in Honolulu, on October 13, 1896. He was about sixty years old at the time of his death. His funeral was held at the Cathedral Basilica of Our Lady of Peace and he was buried at the Honolulu Catholic Cemetery.

Pua Lane in Honolulu is named after him.

== Bibliography ==
- Blount, James Henderson (1895). The Executive Documents of the House of Representatives for the Third Session of the Fifty-Third Congress, 1893–'94 in Thirty-Five Volumes. Washington, DC: U.S. Government Printing Office. OCLC 191710879.
- Hawaii (1918). Lydecker, Robert Colfax (ed.). Roster Legislatures of Hawaii, 1841–1918. Honolulu: Hawaiian Gazette Company. OCLC 60737418.
- Kuykendall, Ralph Simpson (1967). The Hawaiian Kingdom 1874–1893, The Kalakaua Dynasty. Vol. 3. Honolulu: University of Hawaii Press. ISBN 978-0-87022-433-1. OCLC 500374815.
- Liliuokalani (1898). Hawaii's Story by Hawaii's Queen, Liliuokalani. Boston: Lee and Shepard. ISBN 978-0-548-22265-2. OCLC 2387226.
- Loomis, Albertine (1963). "The Longest Legislature" (PDF). Seventy-First Annual Report of the Hawaiian Historical Society for the Year 1962. 71. Honolulu: Hawaiian Historical Society: 7–27. hdl:10524/35.
- Pukui, Mary Kawena; Elbert, Samuel H.; Mookini, Esther T. (1974). Place Names of Hawaii. Honolulu: University of Hawaii Press. p. 81. ISBN 978-0-8248-0524-1. OCLC 1042464.
- Siddall, John William (1917). Men of Hawaii. Vol. 1. Honolulu: Honolulu Star-Bulletin. OCLC 16326675.
- Siddall, John William (1921). Men of Hawaii. Vol. 2. Honolulu: Honolulu Star-Bulletin. OCLC 16326675.
- Silva, Noenoe K. (2004). Aloha Betrayed: Native Hawaiian Resistance to American Colonialism. Durham: Duke University Press. ISBN 0-8223-8622-4. OCLC 191222123.
