= Astrid Achi =

Ecuadorian operatic soprano (1961–2023)

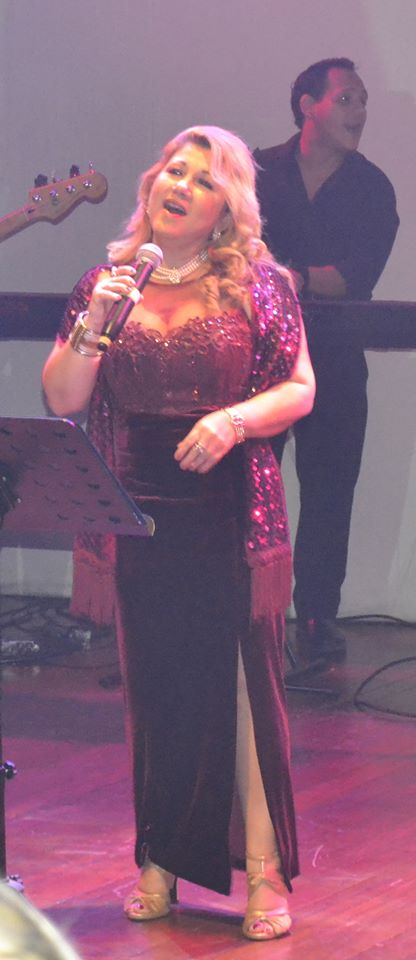
- Achi in 2015
- Born: Astrid Ileana del Carmen Achi Dávila; 19 September 1961; Guayaquil, Ecuador
- Died: 13 October 2023 (aged 62); Guayaquil, Ecuador
- Education: Antonio Neumane Conservatory
- Occupations: Operatic soprano; Academic teacher
- Children: 2

Astrid Ileana del Carmen Achi Dávila (19 September 1961 – 13 October 2023) was an Ecuadorian operatic soprano based in Guayaquil. She taught at the Antonio Neumane Conservatory and at the University of the Arts. She also performed and recorded popular music.

== Biography ==
Achi began singing at age three and appeared early on programs of Channel 4. She studied singing and piano at the Antonio Neumane Conservatory of Guayaquil, in addition to continuing her studies in singing with Beatriz Parra and Nelly de Rivas, and piano with Lila Álvarez and Divina de Hlavenka. She won the prize from the Philanthropic Society of Guayaquil twice.

=== Musical career ===
Achi began singing professionally at age 21. She performed lead roles in Verdi's La traviata, Donizetti's L'elisir d'amore and Lucia di Lammermoor and Rossini's Il barbiere di Siviglia. In concerts, she performed Orff's Carmina Burana and Verdi's Requiem, among others. She participated in the first Latin American Youth Concert of Classical Music in 1978, representing Ecuador. In 1995, Achi was a semi-finalist at Luciano Pavarotti's International Voice Competitions in New York City. In 2006, she won the First International Prize at the Song Festival in Egypt.

=== Popular music ===
While Achi initially did not want to mix classical and popular music, she began recording boleros in 1996, in arrangements by Pedro Periquín Castro Silva, with songs such as "Arráncame la vida", "Nostalgia", "Alfonsina", and "El hombre del piano". She later recorded pasillo music, ballads, Christmas music, and Latin music. One of her favourite songs was "Como la cigarra" by María Elena Walsh.

=== Teaching ===
Achi taught at the Guyaquil Conservatory and at the University of the Arts. She led the Municipal adult choir, and was a cultural manager. She traditionally sang the city's anthem, "Aurora Gloriosa", for a ceremony on 9 November for the last ten years.

== Personal life ==
Achi was married to Nelson Estrella; the couple was divorced. She had two daughters, the younger with her former husband.

She died on 13 October 2023 at age 62 as a result of cardiorespiratory arrest after complications from surgery; she had suffered from lung cancer.

== Discography ==
- Voz y sentimiento.
- Mágico mirar.
