= Carlotta Stewart Lai =

Educator and administrator in the public school system of Hawaii, US

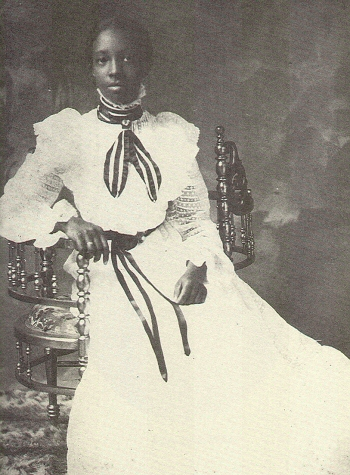
- Lai around age 19
- Born: September 16, 1881; Brooklyn, New York
- Died: July 6, 1952 (aged 70); Honolulu, Hawaii
- Education: Oahu College (Punahou School)
- Occupations: Teacher, school principal
- Spouse: Yun Tim Lai
- Parent(s): Thomas McCants Stewart, Charlotte L. Harris Stewart
- Relatives: McCant Stewart, Gilchrist Stewart (siblings)

Carlotta Stewart Lai (September 16, 1881 – July 6, 1952) was an educator and administrator in the Hawaiian public schools for four decades. She was the first African American school principal in Honolulu. Lai, an African American from New York, worked as a teacher and educational leader at a time when these occupations were largely closed to African Americans on the U. S. mainland, and she achieved professional success at a time when African Americans represented only 0.2 percent of the population of Hawaii.

== Early life ==
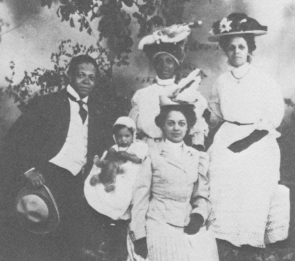
1907 photo of (from left to right) Carlotta Stewart Lai's brother, McCants Stewart, along with his daughter Mary Katherine Stewart, Carlotta Stewart Lai (standing), McCants Stewart's wife Mayme Delia Weir (seated), and McCants Stewart's sister-in-law Harriett Anna Weir.

Lai was born in 1881 in Brooklyn, New York to Thomas McCants Stewart and Charlotte L. Harris Stewart. She was the third child and the only daughter, and she attended public school in Brooklyn. Her brothers, McCants Stewart and Gilchrist Stewart, both became attorneys. Her father, Thomas McCants Stewart, was an attorney and writer in New York, who was also involved in party politics in the field of voting rights. Her mother was a graduate of Wilberforce University. Lai's maternal aunt was Verina Morton-Jones, a physician, charter founder of the Brooklyn NAACP, and co-founder of the Urban League.

When she was 18 years old in 1898, she moved to Hawai'i with her father and stepmother. Her father decided to move the family to Hawai'i in hopes of furthering his legal career. He was able to develop his legal practice advocating for "all varieties of people in diverse Honolulu,” and helped draft Honolulu's City Charter.

When her father left Hawaii in 1905, Lai remained and never again returned to the U.S. mainland. Despite not having her family with her in Hawai'i, Lai had a vibrant social life with close friends and involvement in activities such as dances, parties, baseball games, and vacations. Scholars postulate that this social involvement, along with her professional progress and ability to "reside openly in an integrated community," may have been some reasons why Lai decided to remain in Hawai'i.

== Education ==
Lai attended Oahu College (now Punahou School) for one year where she participated in the school's literary society and played on the girls' basketball team. In 1902, she earned a Normal School teaching certification, which qualified her to teach in Hawai'i's public schools.

== Career ==
Lai began her teaching career at Sacred Hearts Convent.

In 1909, when she was 28 years old, Lai was principal of Ko'olau Elementary School in Kauai, where she taught children from many different races and ethnic backgrounds. This achievement has been described as "striking for a Black woman in a society where Blacks had no political influence... or where few Blacks resided."

In 1933, Lai became principal of Hanamaulu School, now the site of King Kaumualii Elementary School in Kauai. At Hanamaulu School, Lai was not only the principal, but she also supervised the library and cafeteria, and taught English.

Lai attended professional conferences of the Hawai'i Education Association and the Kaua'i Education Association.

She retired from teaching in 1944, after 41 years of service with the Hawaii Department of Education.

== Personal ==
In 1916, Lai married Yun Tim Lai, a car salesman of Chinese descent who was born in 1886 in Kauai. Lai was close friends with her sister-in-law, Ruth Aki Ching, who was later named as the executor and a benefactor of her will. Lai's husband died unexpectedly in 1935 during a visit to Hong Kong. They had no children, and she did not remarry.

Lai died at the Manoa Convalescent Home on July 6, 1952.

Correspondence and other papers related to Lai's family history is archived at Howard University, pursuant to a donation by Katherine Stewart Flippin, Lai's niece and longtime special education teacher in San Francisco, California.
