= Stella Maude Jones =

American archivist, historian (1889–1955)

- Born: Maude Jones; January 12, 1889; Honolulu, Territory of Hawaii, U.S. (now Hawaii, United States)
- Died: January 24, 1955 (aged 66); Honolulu, Territory of Hawaii, U.S.
- Burial place: O'ahu Cemetery
- Education: Punahou School, Oahu College
- Occupations: Archivist, historian, librarian

Stella Maude Jones (née Maude Jones; January 12, 1889 – January 24, 1955) was an American archivist, historian, and librarian. She was the first official archivist for the Territory of Hawaii when she started in 1931.

== Early life and education ==
Maude Jones was born on January 12, 1889, in Honolulu, to parents Flora Ihilani (née Wood), and Pierre Jones. Her mother Flora was a close friend of Queen Emma of Hawaii, and sometimes worked for the Queen; and her father Pierre was a teacher at St. Albans School (now ʻIolani School) in Honolulu, and later held a civil servant role in education. Her maternal grandfather was John H. Wood (1816–1892), a pioneer merchant and shoemaker who moved from Massachusetts to Hawaii in 1846, and is credited with building the first brick store building on Fort Street in Honolulu.

Jones attended Punahou School in Honolulu, Hawaii. She graduated in 1908 from Oahu College. Additionally she studied bookbinding under the Gaylord Brothers (now Gaylord Archival) in Syracuse, and studied library training under Edna Allyn from the Library of Hawaii (now Hawaii State Library).

== Career ==
Jones was an assistant librarian for 18 years at the Library of Hawaii. In 1931, she was appointed librarian of the board of commissioners of public archives for the Territory of Hawaii, succeeding Charles E. Hogue in the role.

From 1935 to 1937, Jones worked as the custodian of the Huliheʻe Palace in Kailua, Hawaii, as well as helped with the restoration plans for the building where she worked alongside the Daughters of Hawaii and the local government. In 1937, she returned to working for the Territory of Hawaii as an archivist.

Jones was the past president of the Hawaii Library Association; and she was a trustee of the Hawaiian Historical Society from 1940 until her death in 1955.

Jones died on January 24, 1955, at Queen's Hospital in Honolulu, and is buried in O'ahu Cemetery.
