= Oahu College =

College in Honolulu, Hawaii

Coordinates: 21.3026°N 157.8300°W

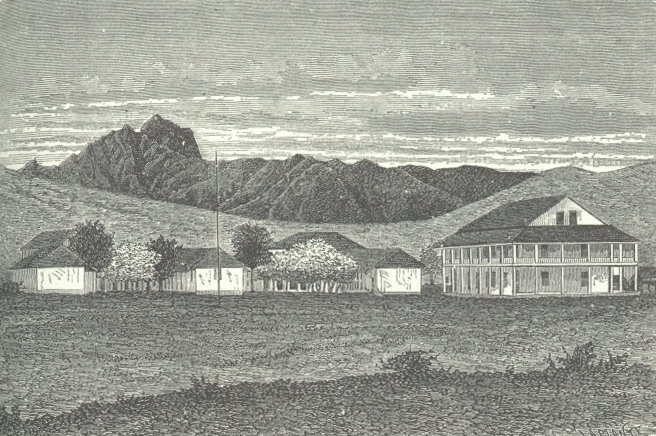
Oahu College, by J. Moynet, based on a photograph by H. Chase

Oahu College (originally and later, Punahou School; 1853-1934) was located in Honolulu, Hawaiʻi. It was a school for the children of Protestant missionaries serving throughout the Pacific region. It was the first school west of the Rocky Mountains and east of Asia with classes in English only. In 1795, King Kamehameha I overtook the land known as Ka Punahou in battle. Along with Ka Punahou, he gave a total of 225 acres (0.91 km^{2}) of land (from the slope of Round Top to the current Central Union Church, which included a 77-acre (310,000 m^{2}) tract of Kewalo Basin) to chief Kameʻeiamoku as a reward for his loyalty. After Kameʻeiamoku died, the land passed to his son, Ulumāheihei Hoapili, who lived there for 20 more years. When Hoapili left to become governor of Maui, he gave the land to his daughter, Kuini Liliha. Liliha and her husband, Oahu Governor Boki, gave Ka Punahou to Reverend Hiram Bingham, one of the first Protestant missionaries in Hawaii. Queen Kaʻahumanu was a strong supporter of the mission and built a house for herself near Bingham. A portion of the stone wall she had built to protect the compound from roaming cattle has been preserved. The first class was held on July 11, 1842, and had 15 students. Daniel Dole was Punahou's first principal.

== History ==
The Oahu College at the Sandwich Islands (1856)

Catalogue of the teachers and pupils of Punahou school and Oahu College for twenty-five years, ending 1866, with an account of the quarter century celebration held at Punahou June 15th, 1866 (1866)

Early in the 1830s, the advantages of Punahou as a site for a boarding school were observed by the Mission, and long before Mr. Bingham's return to the United States in 1840, he had fully approved of its being set apart for that purpose. At that period, no missionary could hold an individual title to land. The project of founding such a school was brought up in 1837, but postponed for financial reasons.

In the meeting of May 1841, the school was definitely founded, the sum of US$2,000 appropriated for the buildings, supplemented by private subscriptions, and Rev. Daniel Dole and his wife, who had just arrived, together with Miss Marcia Smith, were appointed teachers. During that year, the site was prepared under the direction of Mr. Chamberlain and Dr. Judd, a cellar dug, and one-story adobe thatched buildings erected, enclosing two courts, open towards the sea. Four additional rooms were built in 1844. They lasted for 40 years. Rice Hall was built in 1846, and Dole Hall in 1848.

The school was opened at Punahou, July 11, 1842, with 15 pupils in attendance. During the first year, there were 34 pupils, of whom 15 were boarders. In the summer of 1844, the faculty was reinforced by Mr. and Mrs. W. H. Rice, who were transferred from Hana, Maui, to assist in the school. where they remained till 1854, Mr. Rice having special charge of financial matters and of the out-of-door work.

A charter was granted by the government June 6, 1849, to the Trustees of the Punahou School, seven in number, empowering the Mission to fill all future vacancies in the corporation. The Rocky Hill pasture and the Manoa wood lot were purchased and enclosed during the same year. In 1855, the land of Punahou was conveyed by Royal Patent No. 1958, to the American Board, and by that body, 128.94 acres (52.18 ha) of it, together with the buildings and improvements thereon, were deeded to the Trustees of Oahu College March 12, 1863.

The Old School House was built of stone quarried from Rocky Hill in 1852.

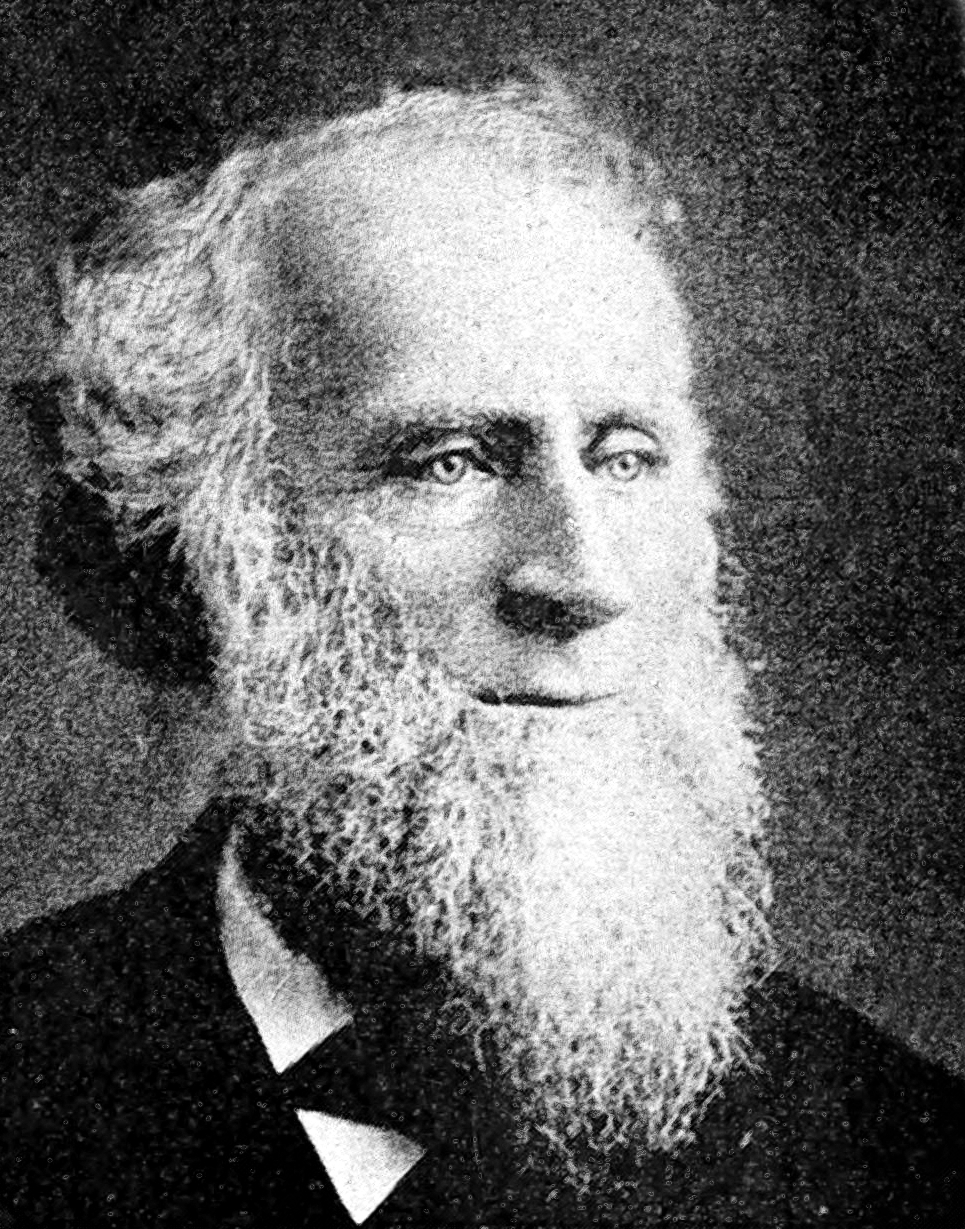
Edward G. Beckwith, president of Oahu College, 1854-1859

A new and enlarged charter was applied for and granted May 23, 1853, under the title of "Oahu College", with thirteen Trustees, including the President. The Rev. E. G. Beckwith, who had conducted the Royal School with remarkable success for three years, was formally installed as President under the new charter, September 25, 1854.

In 1857, an effort was made to raise an endowment for the school, for which about US$14,000 was contributed in the United States, besides a special grant from the American Board of US$5,000, and US$3,000 more to build the first President's house, known as the "Octagon." The Hawaiian Government afterwards granted the land of Hamakuapoko on Maui and three small lands on Kauai, the sale of which realized US$7,745.63. In consideration of this grant to the endowment, the Government had the right of appointing two out of fifteen Trustees, until 1901.

In February, 1859, occurred the famous expedition of the faculty and twenty of the students on the schooner Kinoole to visit the great eruption of Mauna Loa of that year. On the 22nd of the following August, President Beckwith resigned on account of his wife's ill health. The Rev. Eli Corwin acted as President pro tem. until the arrival of Rev. C. T. Mills in November, 1860.

When failing heaith obliged President Mills to resign his position in the summer of 1864, he had brought up the school from a position of partial dependence on the American Board to a self-supporting basis. Among the improvements made during his administration were the laying of water pipes from the spring to the buildings in 1861, and the addition of verandas to the old school hall in 1863, the funds for which were raised by a concert given by the school.

He was succeeded by Professor W. D. Alexander, who served seven years, retiring in the spring of 1871 to accept the position of surveyor-general.

The 25th anniversary of the founding of the school was celebrated June 15, 1866, with much enthusiasm. Professor Edward Payson Church was promoted to fill the place, which he occupied with much acceptance for four years. During this time two omnibuses were purchased by the Trustees, which were run between Nuuanu and Punahou until the inauguration of street tram cars in 1889. A small printing press was purchased by the students, and a small weekly newspaper, the "Punahou Journal", published by them for several years. Mr. Amasa Pratt succeeded President Church, serving for three years. The Rev. William L. Jones then accepted the position, entering upon its duties in June 1878. The fortieth anniversary of the founding of the school was celebrated June 16, 1881, when a strong appeal was made to its friends for a building fund of US$50,000. In 1880 the "lower pasture", containing 31.3 acres (12.7 ha), was divided into building lots, and streets laid out in it. The sale of these lots has added US$21,400. to the endowment.

In 1882, US$30,000 was contributed to the building fund, and during the next year Bingham Hall was built under President Jones' supervision. In January, 1883, the Armstrong lot at the head of Richards street was purchased from the Roman Catholic Mission, and the Punahou Preparatory School opened there.

In the summer of that year, President Jones retired and was succeeded by the Rev. William Channing Merritt, who served for seven years.

In 1884, the Bishop Hall of Science was built and furnished with a laboratory by the liberality of Hon. C. R. Bishop. A house for the president was built by friends of the college in the fall of 1885. In 1888 a large swimming tank was added to the attractions of Punahou, to replace the old bathing pond which had been filled up. In the following year, US$56,000 was added to the endowment, of which sum US$40,000 was given by Hon. C. R. Bishop, and US$16,000 by other friends of the college.

After seven years of efficient service, Mr. Merritt retired in the summer of 1890, and was succeeded by Mr. Frank Alvan Hosmer, who served the college for ten years. On the 25th and 26 June 1891, the semi-centennial celebration of the founding of Punahou School was held, at which General S. C. Armstrong made the leading address. During this decade Pauahi Hall was built, at a cost of US$78,684.05 and dedicated May 21, 1896. This beautiful building was the gift of Hon. C. R. Bishop, the generous patron of education throughout these islands. The assembly hall was furnished with a pipe-organ by Mrs. Mary T. Castle. Much was also done to beautify the grounds, as well as to enlarge the courses of study.

President Hosmer resigned in June 1900 and was succeeded by Arthur Maxson Smith, Ph.D., who began his duties on September 17. During his administration, the Preparatory School was relocated to Punahou. The cornerstone of the building later known as Chas. R. Bishop Hall was laid on October 4, 1901, and the building was completed the following summer at a cost of approximately US$70,000. The construction expenses were covered by a donor after whom the building was named.

During the year 1900, the "upper pasture", now known as "College Hills", was divided into building lots, (most of which have since been sold), and has now become the most attractive suburb of Honolulu. President Smith retired in June 1902, and was succeeded by Mr. Arthur Floyd Griffiths, who arrived here September 6, 1902. His accession has been followed by a period of unexampled progress in every department of the college.

On April 19, 1905, a memorial tablet was unveiled with appropriate ceremonies on the spot where Father Bingham's cottage once stood. With the completion of the new buildings in course of erection, of the library and the athletic field, the college entered upon a new era of usefulness but lacked an adequate endowment.

== Notable people ==
=== Notable alumni ===
- William Charles Achi (1858–1928), Hawaiian lawyer and politician
- William Charles Achi Jr. (1889-1947), Hawaiian attorney, territorial judge, composer
- Agnes Baldwin Alexander (1875–1971), author
- Samuel C. Armstrong (1839–1893), soldier and general during the American Civil War who later became an educator
- Alice Cooper Bailey (1890–1978), writer of children's books and articles for periodicals
- Frederick William Kahapula Beckley Jr. (1874–1943), politician, historian, and educator
- William Richards Castle (1849–1935), lawyer and politician
- Chun Chik-yu (1859–1936), Chinese-Hawaiian businessman
- Sanford B. Dole (1844-1926), Hawaii-born lawyer and jurist
- William G. Irwin (1843–1914), capitalist and sugar planter in the Kingdom of Hawai'i
- Stella Maude Jones (1889–1955) archivist, librarian, and historian
- Albert Francis Judd Jr. (1874–1939) was a lawyer and trust officer
- Jonah Kūhiō Kalanianaʻole (1871–1922), prince of the Kingdom of Hawaiʻi
- John Mākini Kapena (1843–1887), politician, diplomat and newspaper editor
- David Kawānanakoa (1868–1908), prince of the Hawaiian Kingdom and founder of the House of Kawānanakoa
- David Kalākaua Kawānanakoa (1904-1953), Prince Koke, member of the House of Kawānanakoa
- Carlotta Stewart Lai (1881–1952), educator and administrator in the Hawaiian public schools
- Edward Kamakau Lilikalani (1852–1917), political protégé of King Kalākaua of Hawaiʻi
- Liliʻuokalani (1838–1917), only queen regnant and the last sovereign monarch of the Hawaiian Kingdom
- Chun Lung (1852–1889), businessman
- Frederick S. Lyman (1837–1918), surveyor, rancher, judge, and politician
- Albert Brown Lyons (1841–1926), analytical and pharmaceutical chemist
- Samuel Parker (Hawaii politician) (1853–1920), major landowner and businessman on the island of Hawaii
- William Hyde Rice (1846–1924), businessman and politician
- Elizabeth Sumner (1851–1911), Hawaiian high chiefess, and composer
- Sun Mei (1854–1915), older brother of Sun Yat-Sen
- Sun Yat-sen (1866–1925), Chinese revolutionary, statesman, and political philosopher; first provisional president of the Republic of China; first leader of the Kuomintang
- Lorrin A. Thurston (1858–1931), Hawaiian-American lawyer, politician, and businessman

=== Notable administrators and faculty ===
- William DeWitt Alexander (1833-1913), President, Oahu College
- Daniel Dole (1808-1878), Protestant missionary educator
- Katharine Merrill Graydon (1858-1934), American classical scholar; specialist in teaching Greek and Latin literature; professor of English Literature
- Frank E. Midkiff (1887-1983) was an American educator and civic leader; taught English and headed the athletics at Oahu College
- Loye H. Miller (1874 -1970), paleontologist and zoologist
- Susan Tolman Mills (1826-1912), teacher; co-founder of Mills College
- Mary Sophia Hyde Rice (1816-1911), Protestant missionary teacher
- William Harrison Rice (1813–1862), Protestant missionary teacher
- Sarah Bixby Smith (1871–1935), writer and an advocate of women's education
