= Thomas McCants Stewart =

American lawyer (1853–1923)

Thomas M. Stewart
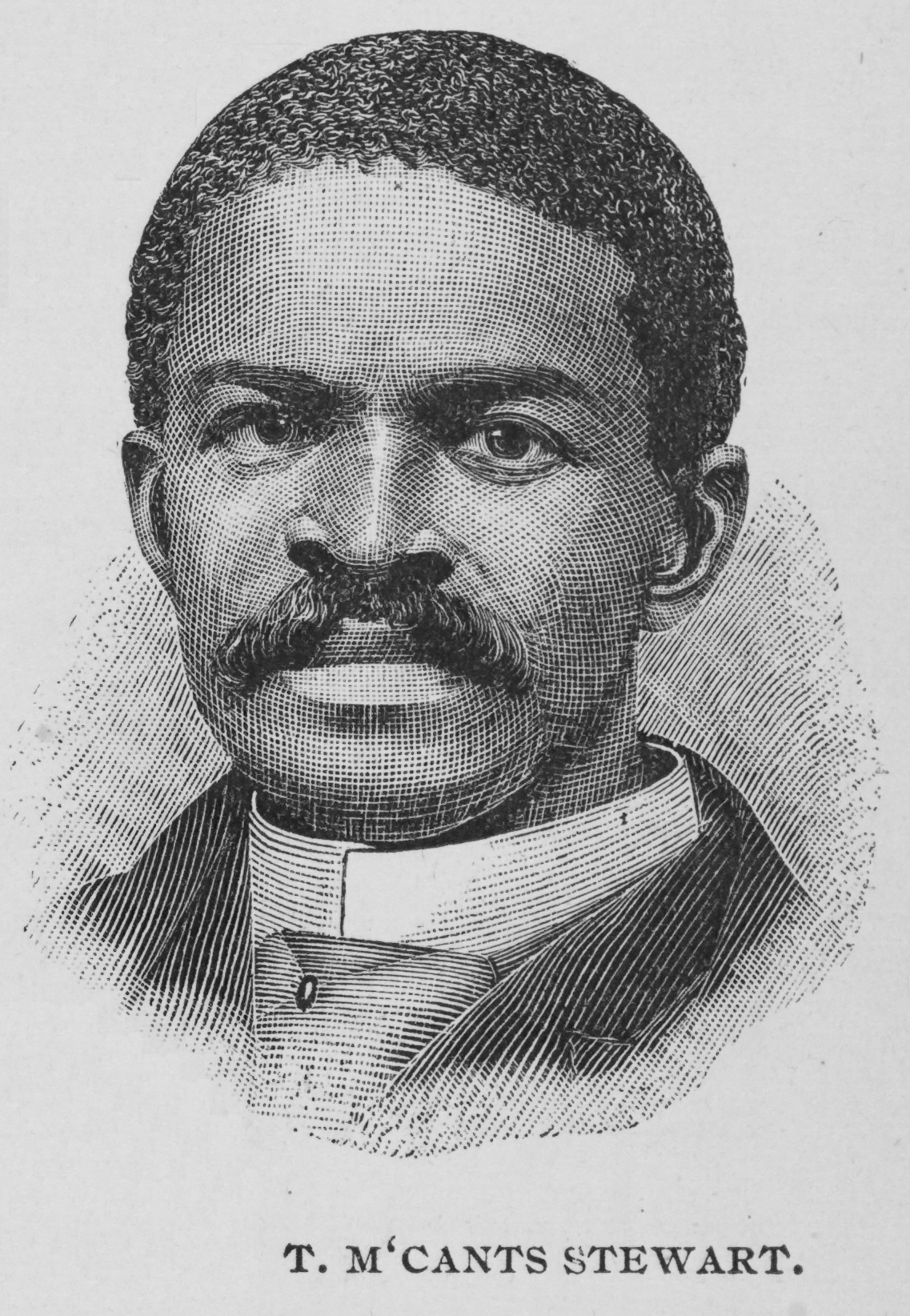
- Stewart in 1887
- Born: December 28, 1853; Charleston, South Carolina
- Died: January 7, 1923 (aged 69); St. Thomas, Virgin Islands
- Education: Howard University, University of South Carolina at Columbia, Princeton College
- Occupations: Clergyman, lawyer and civil rights leader
- Employer(s): Claflin University, Bethel Methodist Episcopal Church, Liberia College
- Organization(s): Brooklyn School Board, Brooklyn, New York, 1891-1894
- Office: Associate Justice of the Supreme Court of Liberia
- Term: 1911–1914
- Political party: Democratic Party
- Spouse(s): Charlotte Pearl Harris, Alice Franklin
- Children: McCants Stewart, Gilchrist Stewart, and Carlotta Stewart Lai
- Parent(s): George Gilchrist Stewart and Anna Morris Stewart

Thomas McCants Stewart (December 28, 1853 – January 7, 1923) was an African American clergyman, lawyer and civil rights leader.

== Early life ==
Stewart was born in Charleston, South Carolina on December 28, 1853. His parents were George Gilchrist Stewart and Anna Morris Stewart, both free African Americans. He attended the Avery Normal Institute in Charleston until 1869, when he went to Washington, DC and enrolled at Howard University, at age 15. In 1873 he left Howard and in 1873, he became one of the first black students to enroll in the University of South Carolina at Columbia, graduating in 1875 with a B.A. and later that year with a LL.B. degree.

== Career ==
He joined the law firm of South Carolina Congressman Robert B. Elliott and D. Augustus Straker. He also worked as professor of mathematics at the State Agricultural College (which was then a part of Claflin University and later developed into South Carolina State University). In 1877 he enrolled at Princeton Theological Seminary. After two years, he was ordained and became pastor at Bethel Methodist Episcopal Church in New York City.

A close friend of Booker T. Washington, Stewart followed his philosophies of self-reliance. He moved to Liberia in 1883, to serve as a professor at Liberia College. In 1886, he began a suit against the President of the People's Line of Albany Steamers for being refused a stateroom. He was a participant in the March 5, 1897 meeting to celebrate the memory of Frederick Douglass which founded the American Negro Academy led by Alexander Crummell. After two years, he returned to Brooklyn where he was president of the Brooklyn Literary Union, became active in the Democratic Party, and was a member of the Brooklyn School Board from 1891 until 1894. As a member of the school board, he helped establish P.S. 83 in Weeksville as officially a mixed-race school and the first public school in the country to include an African American (Maritcha Lyons) as supervisor of new teachers. He also argued civil rights cases before the New York courts.

In 1898, Stewart moved to Hawaii, where he represented "all varieties of people in diverse Honolulu," and participated in the drafting of the Honolulu City Charter. In particular, Stewart presented Chinese people in immigration cases challenging the Chinese Exclusion Act. In 1905, he moved to London. In 1911 he was appointed Associated Justice of the Liberian Supreme Court. His criticism of president Daniel Edward Howard, however, resulted in his removal from the court in 1914. Stewart returned to London, and in 1921 he settled on the Virgin Islands, where he established a legal practice with Christopher Payne. He died in St. Thomas, Virgin Islands in 1923, of pneumonia. At his request, he was buried wrapped in the Liberian flag.

== Writings ==
Stewart wrote three books, In Memory of Rev. James Morris Williams in 1880, Liberia: the Americo-African Republic: Being Some Impressions of the Climate, Resources, and People, Resulting from Personal Observations and Experiences in West Africa in 1886, and Revised Statutes of the Republic of Liberia: Being a Revision of the Statutes from the Organization of the Government in 1848 to and Including the Acts of the Legislature of 1910-1911 published posthumously in 1928. He also wrote the introduction for and helped publish Rufus L. Perry's The Cushite; or, The Children of Ham (the Negro Race) as Seen by the Ancient Historians and Poets.

== Personal life ==
He was married twice, first to Charlotte Pearl Harris, and the second time to Alice Franklin. His son, McCants Stewart, was the first black lawyer in Oregon. His daughter, Carlotta Stewart Lai, was an educator in Hawaii for over four decades.

== See also ==
- List of first minority male lawyers and judges in Hawaii

== Bibliography ==
- In Memory of Rev. James Morris Williams, AME Book Rooms (Philadelphia) 1880.
- Liberia: the Americo-African Republic: Being Some Impressions of the Climate, Resources, and People, Resulting from Personal Observations and Experiences in West Africa, E.O. Jenkins' Sons (New York) 1886.
- Revised Statutes of the Republic of Liberia: Being a Revision of the Statutes from the Organization of the Government in 1848 to and Including the Acts of the Legislature of 1910-1911, Establissements Busson (Paris) 1928
