= Achi Monastery =

Church building in Achi, Georgia

Achi Church
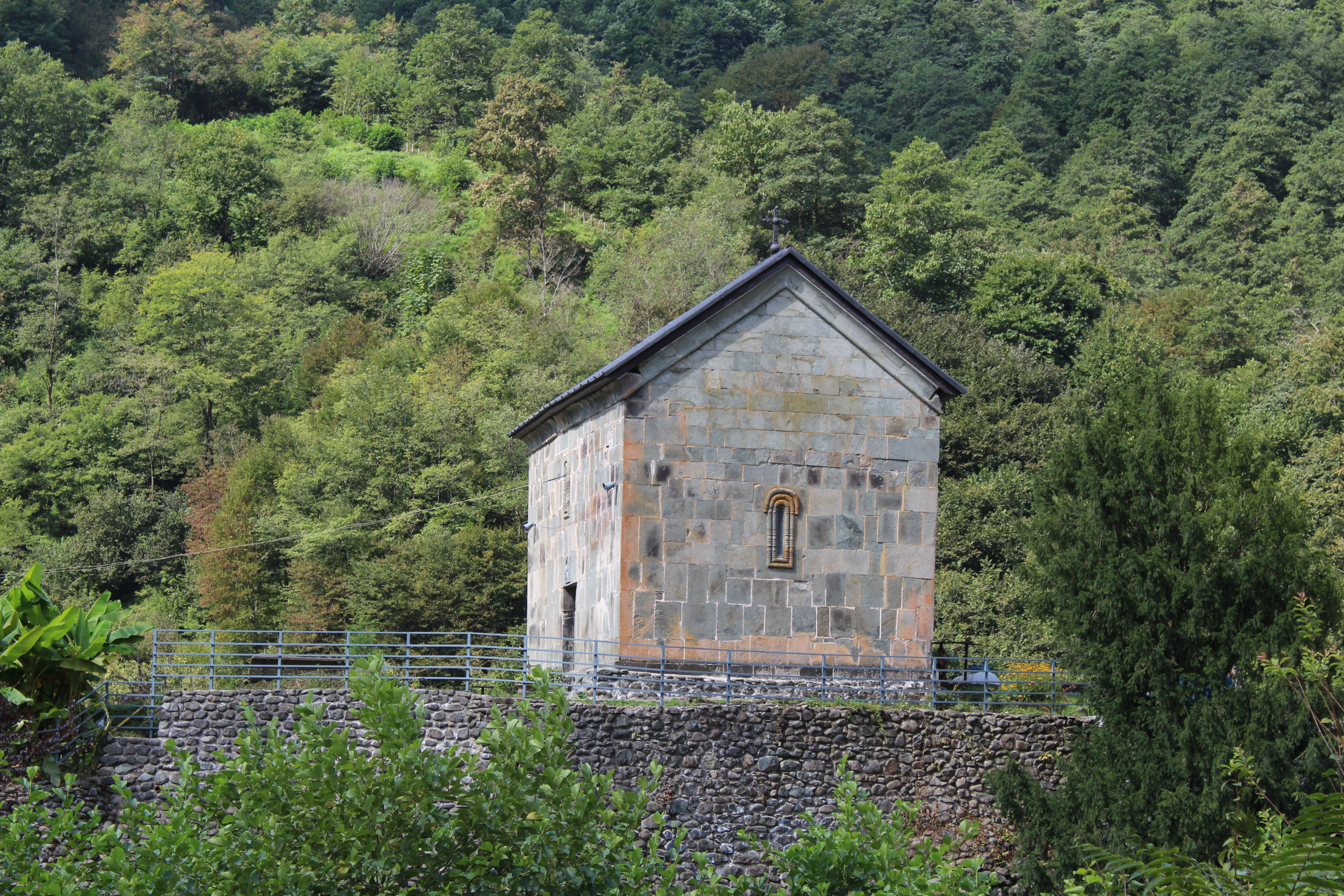
- The Achi church in 2018

- Location within Guria Location within Georgia

Religion
- Affiliation: Georgian Orthodox Church

Location
- Location: Ozurgeti Municipality, Guria, Georgia
- Coordinates: 41.83611°N 42.001389°E

Architecture
- Type: Church
- Completed: 13th/14th century

The Achi Monastery of St. George (Georgian: აჭის წმ. გიორგის სახელობის მონასტერი) is a medieval Georgian Orthodox church near the village of Achi in Georgia's southwestern region of Guria, 9 km south of the town of Ozurgeti.

== Architecture ==
The Achi monastery is a single-nave hall church, built of hewn stone. Constructed at the end of the 13th century or in the early 14th, it was later reroofed, renovated and surrounded by a defensive wall. The whole interior is frescoed. Some murals, stylistically dated to the late 13th century and betraying affinities with the Palaeologan art, are iconographic rarities, such as those depicting the life of Saint George. One of the accompanying inscriptions, in Greek, mentions Onesimos, a Trapezuntine, probably a painter. A Georgian inscription in the asomtavruli script, mounted on the eastern façade, reads: "Saint George, intercede for the lords Saghir, Rati, and Ushanian, and intercede for Nikoloz of Achi and the stonemasons Mikel and Mkhetsidze."

== History ==
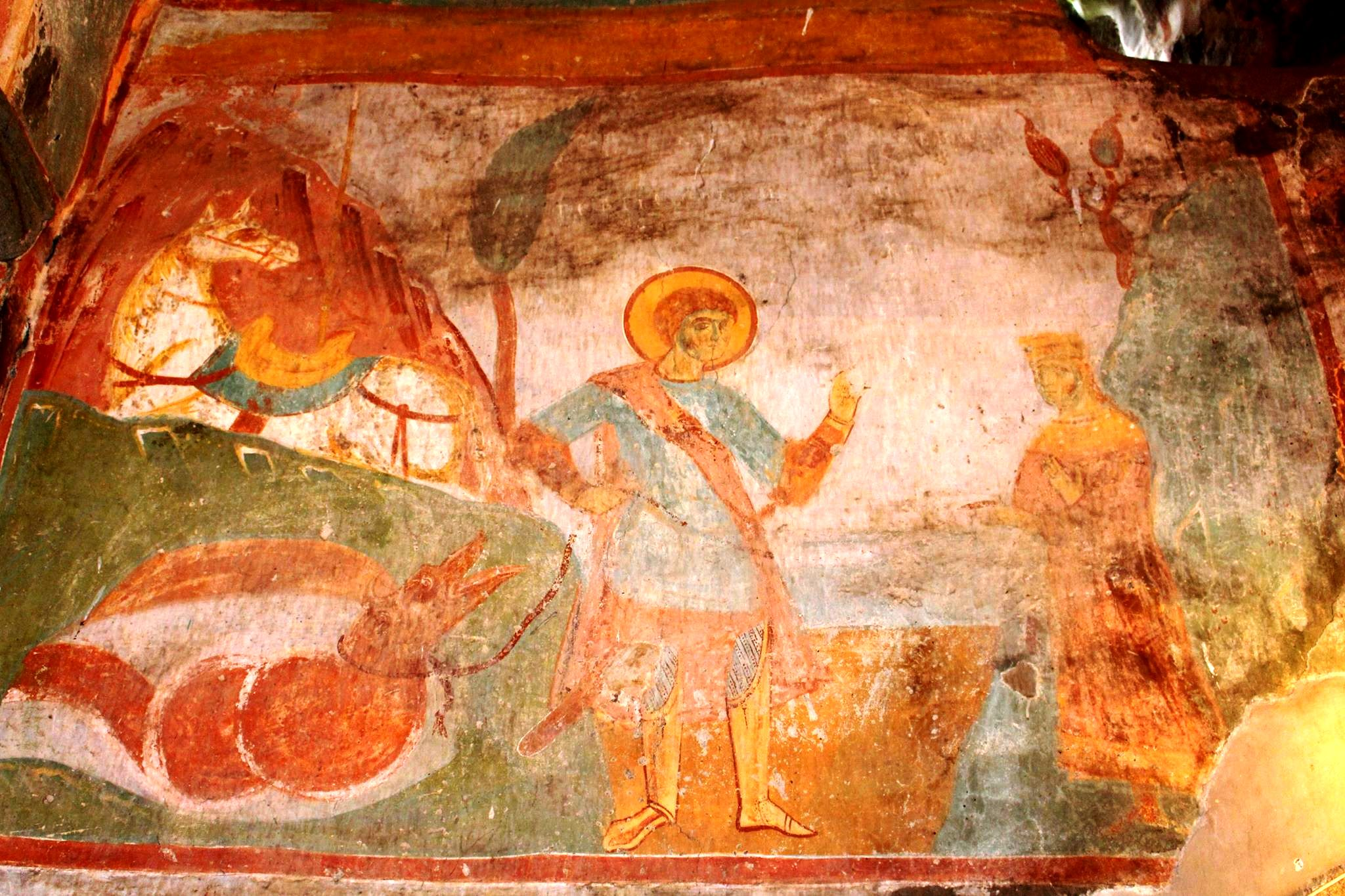
St. George and a defeated dragon. A fresco from Achi.

The Achi monastery was favored by the Princes of Guria, especially Simon II Gurieli and Kaikhosro I Gurieli in the 17th century. Both made significant donations to the church and Kaikhosro made it a metochion of the bishopric see of Shemokmedi. The abbotship of Achi was then hereditary in the Salukvadze-Taqaishvili family. The church housed a gilded silver cross with a Georgian inscription mentioning the queen Tamar, which was discovered by Ekvtime Taqaishvili. The item was preserved in the Salukvadze family during the Soviet period and returned to the Achi church in 2015.

The Achi church was restored to Christian use in 1991. It is inscribed on the registry of the Monuments of National Significance of Georgia.
