= Katherine Stewart Flippin =

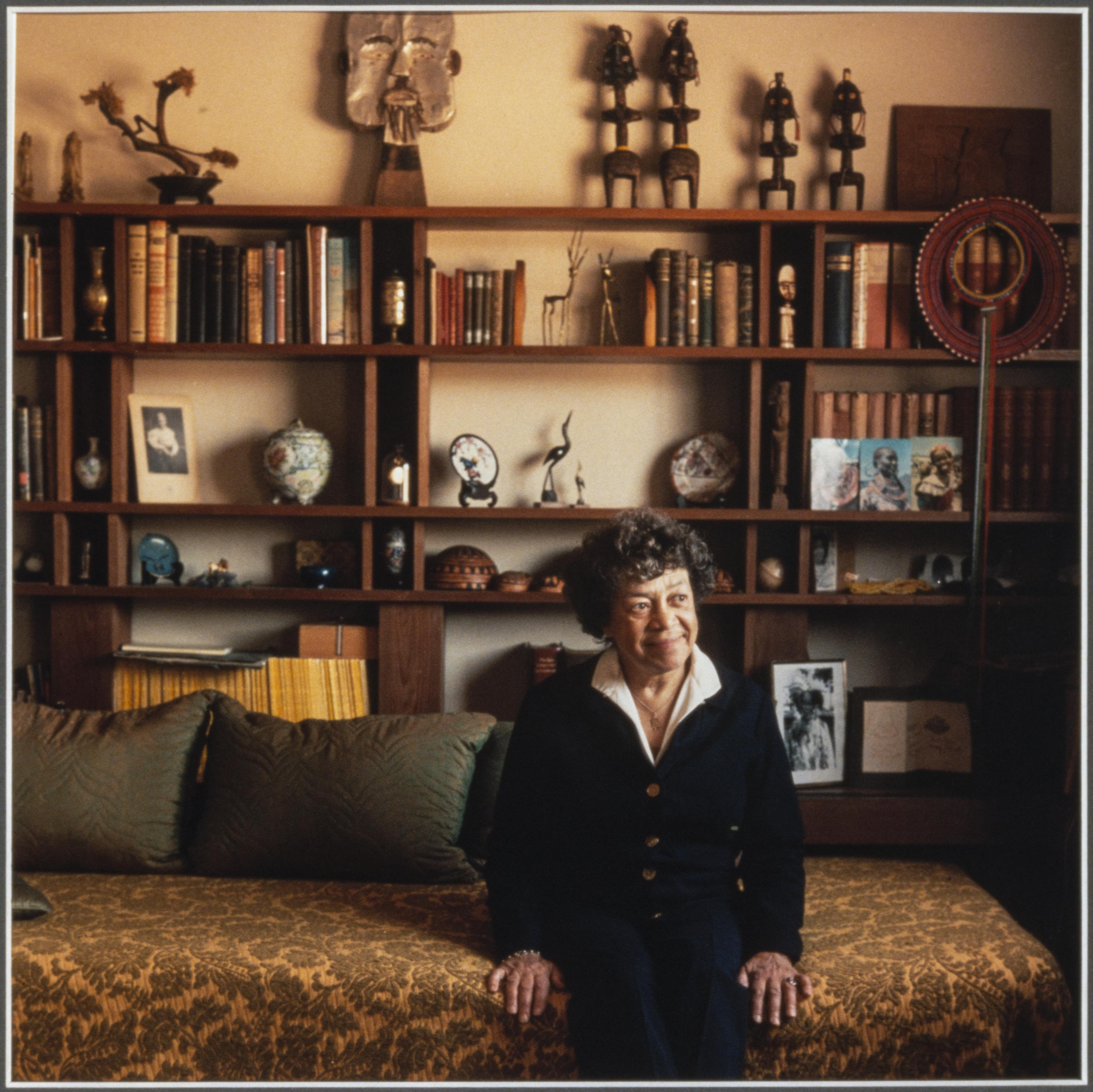
Portrait of Katherine Flippin

Katherine Stewart Flippin (1906–1996) was a special educator in San Francisco and only daughter of lawyer McCants Stewart.

== Biography ==
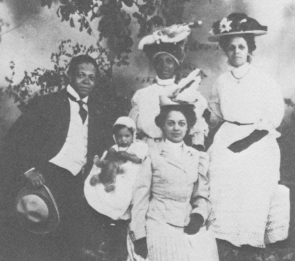
1907 photo of (from left to right) McCants Stewart (1877 - 1919), first African American lawyer in Oregon, along with his daughter Mary Katherine Stewart, sister Carlotta Stewart Lai (standing), wife Mayme Delia Weir (seated), and sister-in-law Harriett Anna Weir.

In Portland, Oregon, Katherine Flippin was born Mary Katherine Stewart to parents McCants and Mary Weir Stewart. During her final year of high school, she dropped out and began a fifteen-year stint working in a department store.

Stewart married Robert Browning Flippin, a community activist and future executive director of the Booker T. Washington Community Service Center. In 1918, they moved to San Francisco. Their marriage is featured in the 2010 book Stormy Weather: Middle-Class African American Marriages Between the Two World Wars.

After getting married, Flippin finished high school and went on to earn both a bachelor's and a master's degrees in early childhood education at San Francisco State College. During this time, she was a supervising teacher in the nursery school at the college. In 1949, Flippin was appointed to the faculty. She established Aid for Brain-Damaged Children, Inc., an experimental unit focused on how non-motor disabled, brain-injured children deviate in visual and auditory areas. Flippin also was a teacher at the Northern California School for Cerebral Palsied and Others.

In 1966, Flippin started as a coordinator for the Head Start program in Pacifica, California. From 1968 until her retirement in 1972, she acted as the director of Cooper's Corner Child Care Center.

In 1967, Flippin donated the papers of her father, McCants Stewart, to Howard University.

A former president of Kappa Delta Pi, she was also an active member in the NAACP, San Francisco Consumer Action, and Children's Home Society. She was the niece of Carlotta Stewart Lai, who was a teacher and educator in Hawaii's public school system for about four decades.
