= Beatriz Parra Durango =

Ecuadorian classical soprano

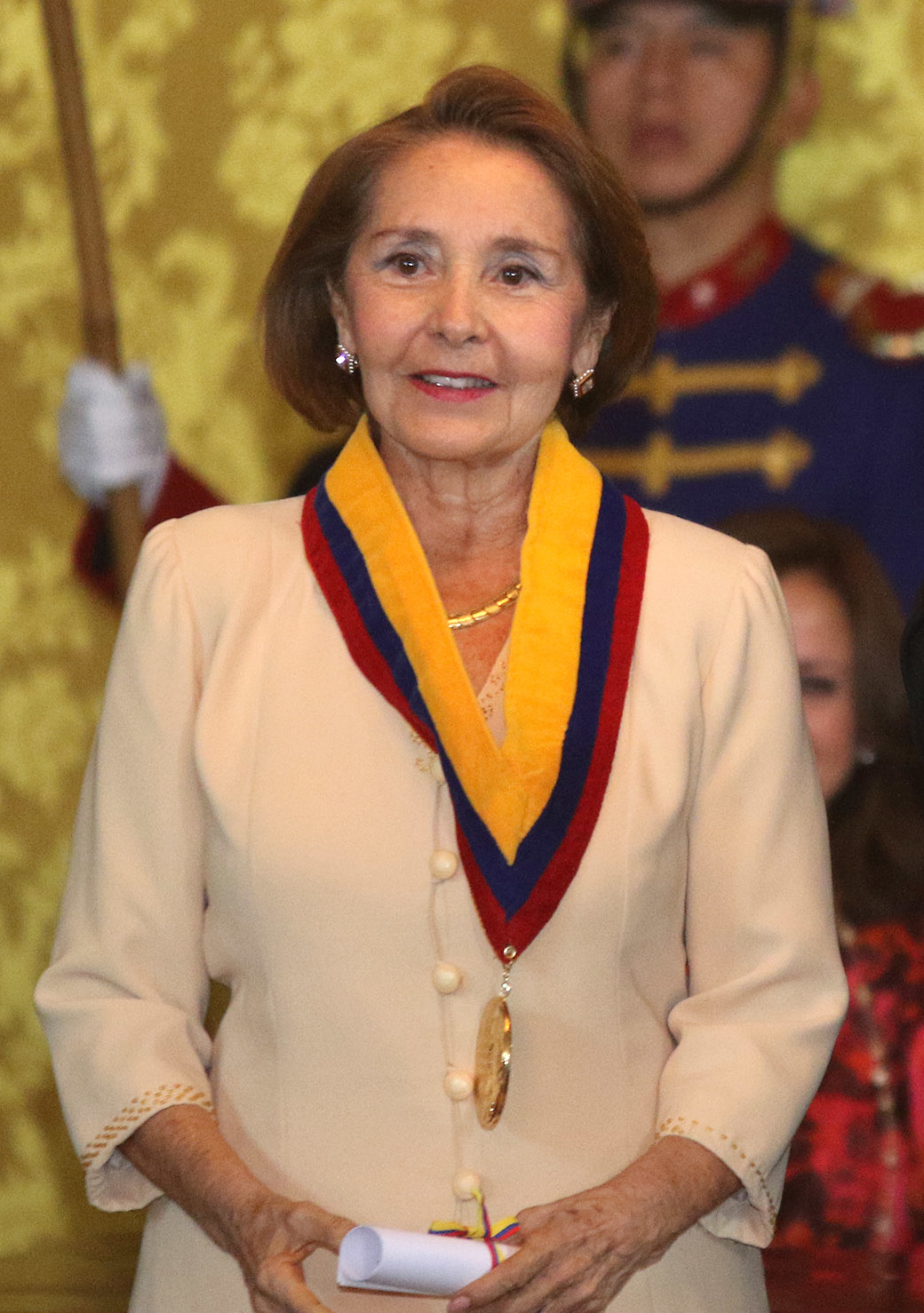

Background information
- Born: 1940 (age 85–86); Guayaquil, Ecuador
- Genres: Classical
- Occupation: Musician
- Instrument: Singing
- Formerly of: Lyrical Ensemble of the House of Culture
- Spouse: Enrique Gil
- Award: Conchita Badía (1975)

Beatriz Parra Durango (born 1940) is an Ecuadorian classical soprano.

== Early life and education ==
Parra Durango was born in Guayaquil the only child of Antonio Parra (1900-1994) and journalist Dora Durango Lopez (1916-1999). Parra's first studies took place at the Conservatory Antonio Neumane in Guayaquil, where she became the soloist of the Conservatory's choir.

== Career ==
In 1957, she received her first prize when she participated in the competition "Searching for a Voice in Ecuador", organized by the House of Culture and Radio CRE. That same year she became part of the cast of the Lyrical Ensemble of the House of Culture.

In 1958, she performed for the first time as a soloist onstage in the role of Duchess Carolina in the zarzuela "Luisa Fernanda". In 1959, she sang the lead role in the Spanish opera Marina under the direction of the Spanish Maestro Carlos Arijita. In 1960 she travelled to Moscow on a scholarship given by the Ministry of Culture of the then USSR, and studied classical singing at the Moscow Conservatory, studying under Nina Dorliak, wife to pianist Sviatoslav Richter. She graduated with the Award For Excellence in 1966.

In 1965, she won the silver medal and second place in the International Vocal Competition organized by the city of Toulouse, France. She sang as a soloist with the Philharmonic Orchestra of Moscow and the Moscow Chamber Orchestra. That same year she received the gold medal in the Musical Competition of George Enesco, Romania.

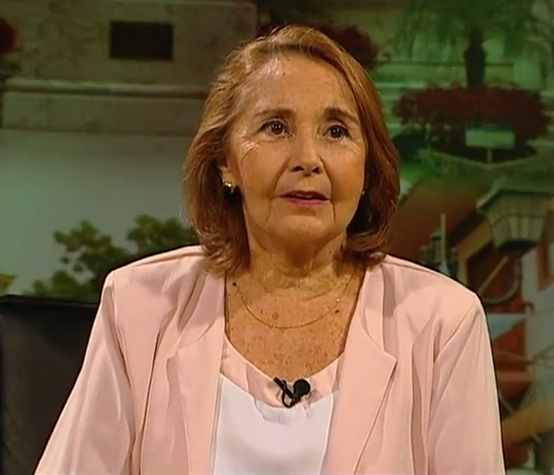
Beatriz Parra (2017)

She earned several first places in vocal competitions in Barcelona and Santiago de Compostela. In 1975 she received the award "Conchita Badía" in Santiago de Compostela.

For fifteen years she was a prima donna and soloist with the Colombia Opera Theater, where her repertoire included verismo such as Verdi and Puccini, romanticists such as Donizetti and classicists such as Mozart. She performed the role of Michaela in Carmen for the Bolshoi Opera House . In the fall of 2001 she was a guest performer of the Iberoamerican Culture Festival.

== Personal life ==
Parra Durango married Enrique Gil, with whom she had her only daughter, singer and classical trainee Beatriz Gil Parra.

Currently, although retired, she teaches voice as head of the Beatriz Parra Foundation, along with the Armenian baritone Konstantin Simonian.
