= William Charles Achi Jr. =

American judge (1889–1947)

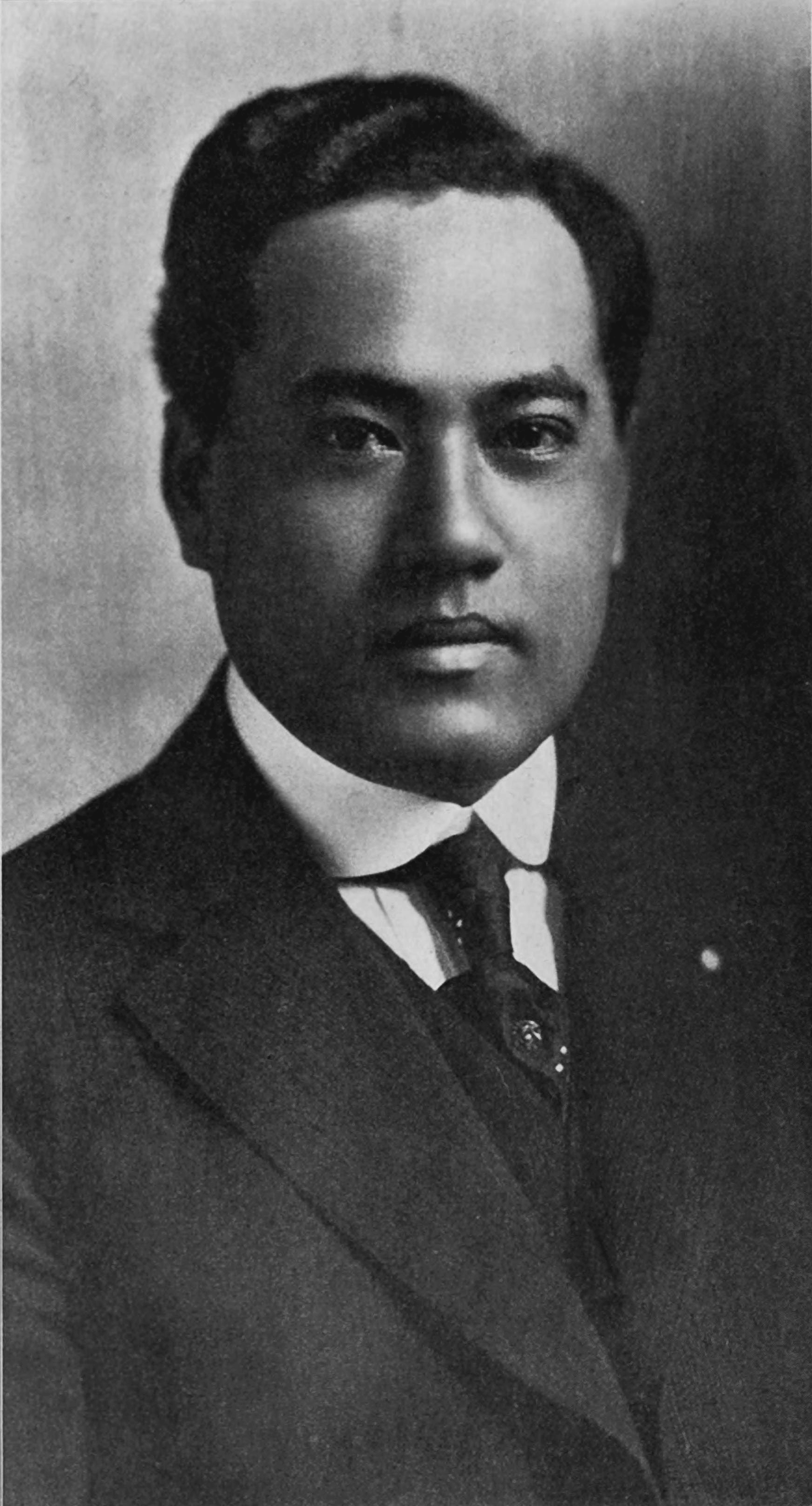
- Born: July 1, 1889; Honolulu, Hawaii
- Died: June 17, 1947 (aged 57)
- Education: University of Michigan
- Occupation: Judge
- Spouse: Rebecca Kaulani Kruce
- Children: William Charles III, Richard Kelii, Mary Ann, Rebecca Kaohuleilani, Lincoln Leleiwi, Stanley Alapai; Stanford Hokulani
- Parents: William Charles Achi (father); Maria Alapai (mother)

William Charles Achi Jr. (July 1, 1889 – June 17, 1947) was a Hawaiian attorney and territorial judge, as well as composer.

== Biography ==
William Charles Achi Jr. was born July 1, 1889, in Honolulu. His father, William Charles Achi, was a political figure in both the Kingdom of Hawaii and the Territory of Hawaii, following annexation by the United States.

Achi attended a diverse collection of colleges, beginning with St. Louis College in Honolulu in 1904, followed by Oahu College in 1908, Stanford University from 1909 to 1911 (where he was a member of both the Stanford varsity baseball team and the Stanford University Symphony Orchestra), Yale University from 1911 to 1912, and the University of Chicago from 1912 to 1913. He completed his B.A. at the University of Michigan in 1914, becoming the first Native Hawaiian to receive a degree from that institution, thereafter receiving a B.L. from the University of Michigan Law School in 1917. He authored of number of college songs during this period, including "Sons of the Stanford Red", "Sons of Eli" and "Fight, Men of Michigan", and wrote a comic opera, the "Pranks of Paprika", while at the University of Chicago.

Admitted to the territorial courts on November 6, 1917, he was in private practice with his father until 1919. On November 19, 1919, Achi was appointed to a four-year term as judge of the Fifth Circuit Court of the Territory of Hawaii by President Woodrow Wilson. He was continually reappointed to the position until July 14, 1934, when Franklin D. Roosevelt instead appointed Carrick Hume Buck. The replacement was motivated, at least in part, by an internal feud between territorial delegate Lincoln L. McCandless and Achi's close friend, Honolulu mayor John H. Wilson.

Achi married Rebecca Kaulani Kruce at Kainaliu in the Kona District of the island of Hawaii, on June 7, 1911. They had six children: William Charles III, Richard Kelii, Mary Ann, Rebecca Kaohuleilani, Lincoln Leleiwi, and Stanley Alapai. He died in a Honolulu hospital on June 17, 1947.
