= William Charles Achi =

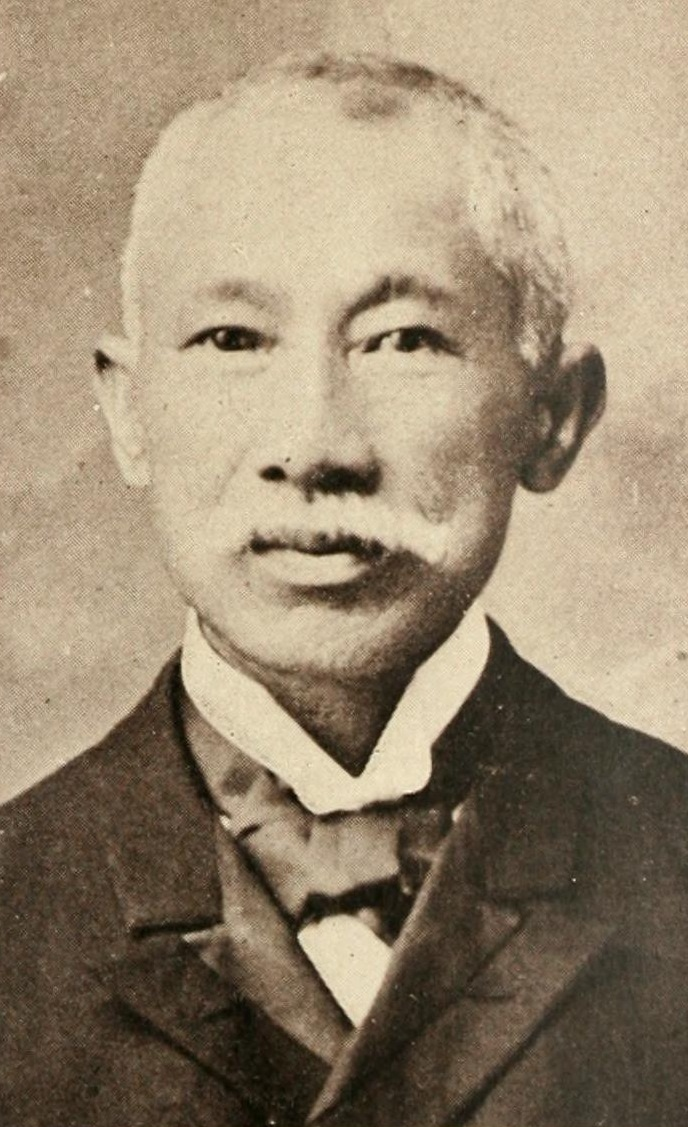
- Born: December 16, 1858; Kohala, Hawaii
- Died: December 1928 (aged 69–70); Honolulu, Hawaii
- Occupation: Lawyer
- Spouse: Maria (Isabella) Alapai
- Children: William Charles Achi Jr.
- Parents: Lum Achi; Kinilau Lualoa

William Charles Achi (1858–1928) was a Hawaiian lawyer and politician. He was of Chinese and Native Hawaiian descent.

William Charles Achi was born December 16, 1858, at Kohala, Hawaii, to Lum and Kinilau (Lualoa) Achi, he was the great great grandson of Puou, one of the warriors of King Kamehameha I. He was educated at Hilo Boarding School, the Lahainaluna Seminary, Maui, and at Oahu College in Honolulu in 1882.

Achi read law in the office of William Richards Castle in Honolulu, and was admitted to the courts of Hawaii in February, 1887. In 1897, he was elected as a Representative to the Legislature of the Republic of Hawaii. The following year, he was elected Councilor of State at the session of the Legislature. After the annexation of Hawaii by the United States, Achi was elected in November 1900 one of the first senators to new Legislature of the Territory of Hawaii. He was re-elected in November, 1902. He was a delegate to Municipal Charter Convention and made a strong fight for a modern city charter for Honolulu in 1916. He was elected an alternate to the Republican National Convention in Chicago in 1916.

Achi married Maria (Isabella) Alapai on June 15, 1883 but they divorced. Their son, William Charles Achi Jr. (1889–1947), became an attorney, and was eventually appointed by Woodrow Wilson to be a territorial judge.
