= Achi, Ozurgeti Municipality =

Achi აჭი
- Village
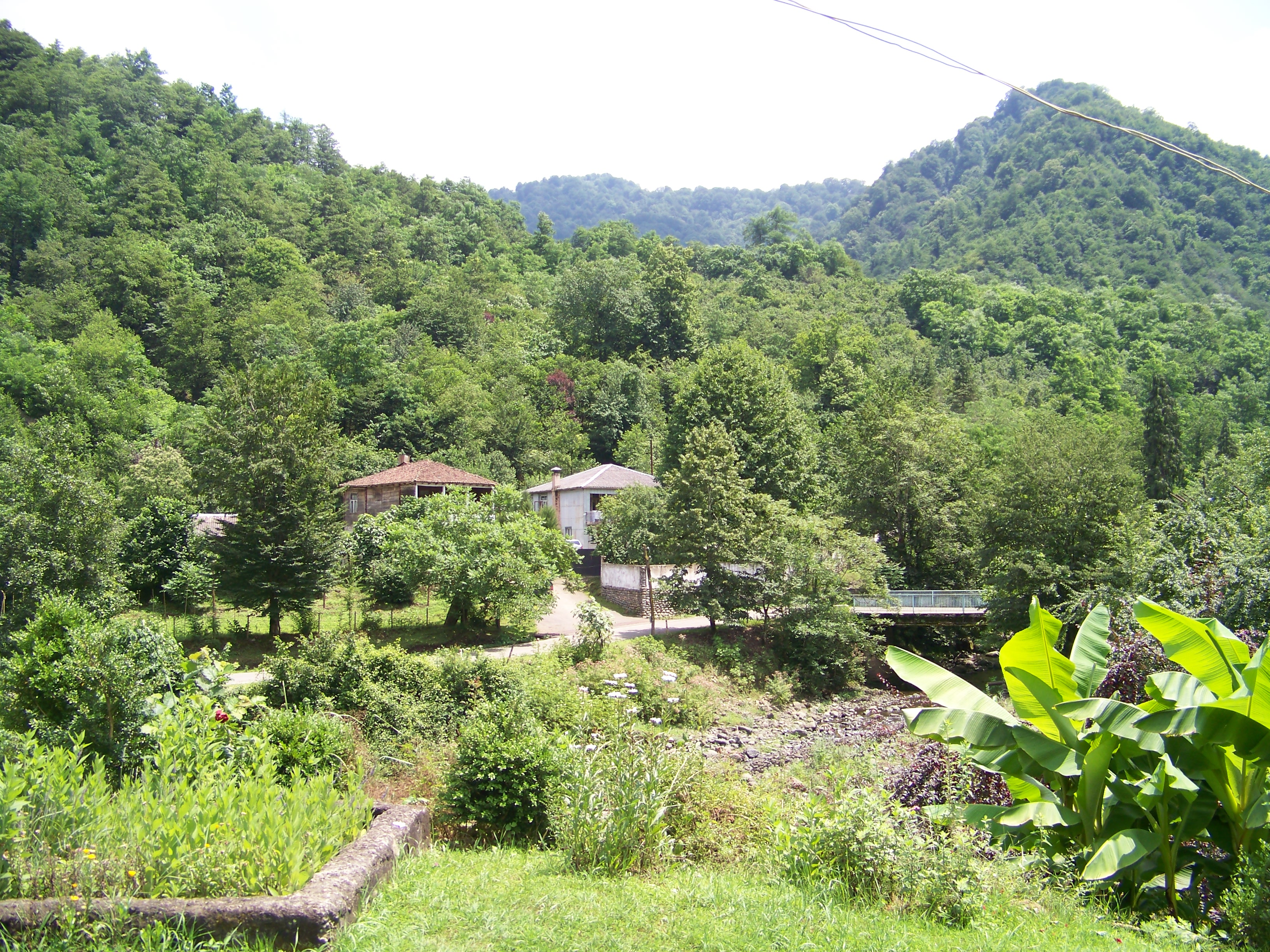

- Location within Georgia Location within Guria
- Coordinates: 41°50′41″N 42°00′14″E
- Country: Georgia
- Mkhare: Guria
- Municipality: Ozurgeti
- Elevation: 420 m (1,380 ft)

Population (2014)
  - Total: 36
- Time zone: UTC+4 (Georgian Time)

Achi (Georgian: აჭი) is a village in the Ozurgeti Municipality of Guria in western Georgia with a population of 36 as of 2014.
