= Hawaiian literature =

Hawaiian literature has its origins in Polynesian mythology. It was originally preserved and expanded solely through oral traditions, as the ancient Hawaiians never developed a writing system. Written literature in the Hawaiian language and literary works in other languages by authors residing in Hawaii did not appear until the nineteenth century, when the arrival of American missionaries introduced the English language, the Latin alphabet, and Western notions of composition to the kingdom.

The earliest compilations of traditional Hawaiian writing were made by John Papa ʻĪʻī, Samuel Kamakau, Kepelino Keauokalani, and David Malo. They were succeeded by King Kalākaua, Martha Beckwith, Abraham Fornander, and William Drake Westervelt, all of whom produced later collections retelling or adapting Hawaii's oral histories.

Other noted authors whose works feature Hawaiian settings and themes, or who were temporarily resident in Hawaii, include Herman Melville, Mark Twain, Robert Louis Stevenson, and Jack London. Detective novelist Earl Derr Biggers is remembered chiefly for his books set in early twentieth century Honolulu, whose protagonist is Chinese-Hawaiian detective Charlie Chan.

Hawaiian literature in the latter half of the twentieth century was characterized by both rapid growth and an increasing emphasis on realism, sometimes influenced by the Second Hawaiian Renaissance and the Hawaiian sovereignty movement.

== List of Hawaii authors ==
- Noelani Arista
- Robert Barclay, author of Hawaii Smiles
- Alan Brennert, author of Moloka'i and Honolulu
- Marie Alohalani Brown
- O. A. Bushnell, author of Kaʻaʻawa, The Return of Lono, and Molokai
- Lee Cataluna
- Eric Chock
- Kiana Davenport
- Gavan Daws
- Darlaine Mahealani Dudoit, founder of 'Oiwi: A Native Hawaiian Journal
- Glen Grant
- Kaui Hart Hemmings, author of The Descendants
- John Dominis Holt IV, author of Waimea Summer, Princess of the Night Rides, On Being Hawaiian and Recollections
- Garrett Hongo
- kuʻualoha hoʻomanawanui, co-founder of 'Oiwi: A Native Hawaiian Journal
- George Kahumoku Jr.
- Matthew Kaopio
- Lopaka Kapanui, author of Haunted Hawaiian Nights and The Legend of Morgan's Corner
- Nora Okja Keller
- Maxine Hong Kingston
- Juliet Kono
- R. Zamora Linmark, author of Rolling the R's
- Darrell H. Y. Lum
- Wing Tek Lum
- Chris McKinney, author of The Tattoo, Mililani Mauka, and Boi No Good
- Ian MacMillan, author of The Red Wind
- Susanna Moore
- Rodney Morales, author of When the Shark Bites
- Milton Murayama
- Ingrid Naiman
- Barack Obama
- Gary Pak
- Mark Panek, author of Hawai'i: A Novel
- Lehua Parker, author of Niuhi Shark Series
- Mary Kawena Pukui
- Shawna Yang Ryan
- Noenoe Silva
- Cathy Song
- Lee Tonouchi
- Haunani-Kay Trask
- Kawai Strong Washburn, author of Sharks in the Time of Saviors
- Kirby Wright
- Lois-Ann Yamanaka

== List of literary magazines ==
- Bamboo Ridge
- 'Oiwi: A Native Hawaiian Journal
