= Eric Chock =

American poet

Eric Chock is a Hawaiian poet, scholar and editor. He served as a professor of English and humanities at the University of Hawaiʻi at West Oʻahu, and coordinated the state's "Poets in the Schools" program for more than twenty years.

In 1978, he cofounded the literary journal Bamboo Ridge with Darrell H. Y. Lum to encourage the growth of a distinctly Hawaiian literary style. Authors whose works appeared in Bamboo Ridge included Gary Pak, Lois-Ann Yamanaka, Rodney Morales, Wing Tek Lum, and Cathy Song. Pak described the journal as "the primary literary force in Hawaii today", and it received the Hawaii Award for Literature in 1996 from the Hawaii Literary Arts Council. The success and influence of the Bamboo Ridge group of writers, among whom Chock himself was included, was later examined in detail by literary critic Rob Wilson in his study Reimagining the American Pacific.

Chock has also edited several anthologies featuring Hawaiian writers, as well as Small Kid Time Hawaii and Haku Mele o Hawaii, two collections of children's poetry.

He received the Elliot Cades Award for Literature in 1996.

== Bibliography ==
- Moving Toward the Light: A Sequence of Poems (1977)
- Ten Thousand Wishes (1978)
- Talk Story: An Anthology of Hawaii's Local Writers (1978) (editor)
- The Best of Bamboo Ridge (1986) (edited with Darrell H. Y. Lum)
- Pake: Writings by Chinese in Hawaii (1989) (edited with Darrell H. Y. Lum)
- Last Days Here (1990)
- Pass On, No Pass Back! (1990) (edited with Darrell H. Y. Lum and Art Kodani)
- The Best of Honolulu Fiction (1999) (edited with Darrell H. Y. Lum)
