= Karin Kiwus =

German poet

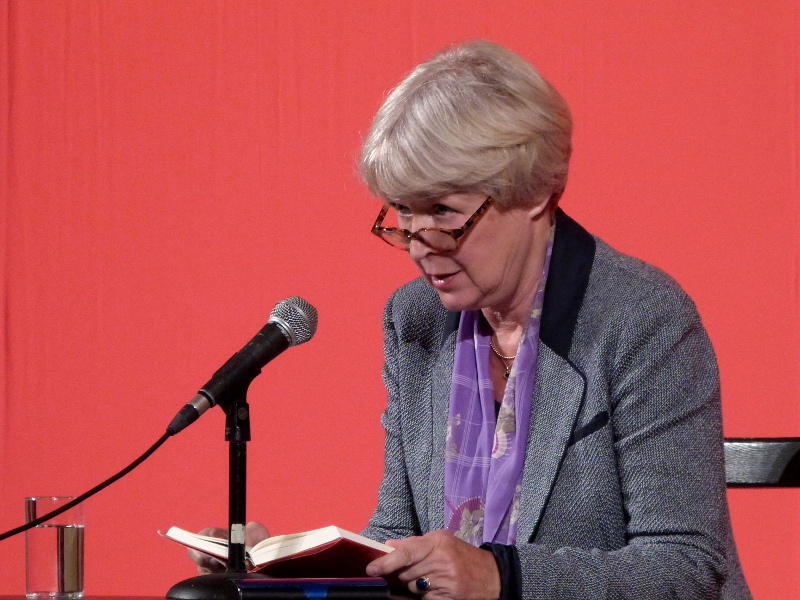
Karin Kiwus

Karin Kiwus (born 9 November 1942) is a German poet from Berlin. After studying journalism, German studies and politology she worked as an editor as well as a university teacher in Austin, Texas. She was the domestic partner of the German film director Frank Beyer until his death in 2006. She has been active in the field of collaborative poetry, writing renshi under the guidance of Makoto Ooka.

== Works (selection) ==
- "Von beiden Seiten der Gegenwart". Poems. 1976.
- "Vom Essen und Trinken". 1978.
- "Angenommen später". Poems. 1979.
