= Joseph Stanton =

American poet

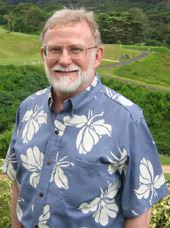
- Occupations: poet, scholar, professor

Joseph Charles Stanton (born 1949) is a Professor of Art History and American Studies at the University of Hawaiʻi at Mānoa and a widely published poet.

His poems have appeared in Poetry, Poetry East, Harvard Review, Ekphrasis, New York Quarterly, Antioch Review, New Letters, and many other journals and anthologies.

== Biography ==
Joseph Charles Stanton, born February 4, 1949, in St. Louis, Missouri, is a poet and a scholar who taught art history and American studies at the University of Hawaiʻi at Mānoa where he is a Professor Emeritus. He has published extensively on American art, literature, and culture. One of his special areas of work concerns the intersection of the visual and literary arts. His essays on image-word topics have been appeared in such journals as Art Criticism, American Art, Journal of American Culture, Harvard Library Bulletin, The Lion and the Unicorn, Soundings, Children's Literature, and Michigan Quarterly Review. He has also written on baseball topics for such journals as Nine, Spitball, and Aethlon.

As an art historian, Stanton has published essays on Edward Hopper, Winslow Homer, Maurice Sendak, Chris Van Allsburg, Edward Gorey, and many other artists.

Joseph Stanton's books of poems include A Field Guide to the Wildlife of Suburban Oʻahu, Cardinal Points, Imaginary Museum: Poems on Art, and What the Kite Thinks. He has published more than 300 poems in such journals as Poetry, Harvard Review, Poetry East, The Cortland Review, Ekphrasis, Bamboo Ridge, Elysian Fields Quarterly, Endicott Studio's Journal of the Mythic Arts, and New York Quarterly. In 2007, Ted Kooser selected one of Stanton's poems for his "American Life in Poetry" column. Under the guidance of Makoto Ooka, he participated with Wing Tek Lum and Jean Toyama in the collaborative renshi poem What the Kite Thinks. His next book of poems, Lifelines: Poems for Winslow Homer and Edward Hopper, will be published by Shanti Arts Publishing in 2023.

His 2005 book, The Important Books: Children's Picture Books as Art and Literature, he examines the picture-books of such artist-writers as Maurice Sendak, Chris Van Allsburg, Arnold Lobel, and William Joyce. His 2011 book, Looking for Edward Gorey, is the culmination of his many years of research into all things Gorey. His other books include Prevailing Winds, Moving Pictures, Things Seen, Imaginary Museum: Poems on Art, A Field Guide to the Wildlife of Suburban Oʻahu: Poems, Cardinal Points: Poems on St. Louis Cardinals Baseball, What the Kite Thinks: A Linked Poem, Stan Musial: A Biography, and A Hawaiʻi Anthology.

== Awards and honors ==
In 1997, Stanton received the Cades Award for his contributions to the literature of Hawaiʻi.

In 2010, Stanton received the Tony Quagliano International Poetry Award from the Hawaiʻi Council for the Humanities.

In 2014, he was selected for the Ekphrasis Prize by Ekphrasis magazine.

In 2015, he won the James Vaughan Poetry Award by Hawaiʻi Pacific Review.

In 2018, Stanton was given the Loretta Petrie Award for his contribution to the literary community in Hawaiʻi.

Stanton's A Hawaiʻi Anthology, won a Ka Palapala Po'okela Award for excellence in literature. Two of his other books have won honorable mention Ka Palapala Po'okela Awards.

Poems selected for anniversary ("best of") anthologies: Poetry East (2000), Hawaiʻi Pacific Review (1998), Long Island Quarterly (1997, 1994), Bamboo Ridge (1986), First Place, Hawaiʻi Pacific Review Poetry Contest, 1995.

One of the winners of the Poetry on the Bus Competition, sponsored by the Arts Council of Hawaiʻi and the City of Honolulu, 1988.

== Books ==
=== Poetry collections ===
Solo Publications

- Lifelines, Shanti Arts Publications, 2023
- Prevailing Winds, Shanti Arts Publications, 2022
- Moving Pictures, Shanti Artis Publications, 2019
- Things Seen, Brick Road Poetry Press, 2016
- A Field Guide to the Wildlife of Suburban Oʻahu, Time Being Books, 2006
- Cardinal Points: Poems on St. Louis Cardinals Baseball, McFarland and Company, 2002
- Imaginary Museum: Poems on Art, Time Being Books, 1999

Collaborative Book

- What the Kite Thinks: A Linked Poem by Ooka Makoto, Wing Tek Lum, Joseph Stanton, and Jean Yamasaki Toyama, University of Hawaiʻi, 1994

Anthologies and Collections

- Paumanok: Transition, Island Sound Press, 2022
- Poets Speaking to Poets: Echoes and Tributes, ed. by Nicholas Fargnoli and Robert Hamblin, 2021
- From the Farther Shore: Cape Code & the Islands Through Poetry, ed. by Alice Kociemba, Robin Smith-Johnson, and Rich Youmans, 2021
- Double Features: Big Ideas in Film, Great Books Foundation, 2017
- Paumanok, Island Sound Press, ed. by Kathaleen Donnelly, 2022, 2013, and 2009
- Heart of the Order: Baseball Poems, ed. by Gabriel Fried, Persea Books, 2014
- Collecting Life: Poets on Objects Known and Imagined edited by Madelyn Garner and Andrea Watson, 2010
- Troll's-Eye View: A Book of Villainous Tales, ed. by Ellen Datlow and Terri Windling, Viking-Penguin, 2009
- Paumanok: Poems and Pictures of Long Island, ed. By Kathaleen Donnelly, Cross-Cultural Communications, 2009
- We Go Eat: A Mixed Plate from Hawaiʻi's Food Culture, ed. Craig Howes and Susan Yim, 2008
- Honolulu Stories, ed. Gavan Daws, 2008
- Sinatra:...but buddy, I'm kind of a poem, ed. Gilbert L. Gigliotti. Washington D.C.: Entasis Press, 2007
- "Gondola Signore Gondola": Venezia nella poesia americana del Novecento, ed. and trans. Mamoli Zorzi Rosella, Supernova Edizioni, 2007
- Horsehide, Pigskin, Oval Tracks, and Apple Pie, ed. James Vlaisch, McFarland, 2006
- Mona Poetica: A Poetry Anthology, ed. Diane DeCillis and Mary Jo Gillet, 2005
- Line Drives: 100 Contemporary Baseball Poems, ed. Brook Horvath and Tim Wiles, 2001
- Of Frogs and Toads: Poems and Short Prose Pieces Featuring Amphibians, ed. Jill Carpenter, 1998
- Fire in the Sea, ed. Sue Cowing, Honolulu Museum of Art, 1996
- Dumb Beautiful Ministers, ed. William Heyen, Birnham Wood Graphics, 1996.
- In Autumn: A Collection of Long Island Poetry, ed. George Wallace, Birnham Wood Press, 1994
- Best of Bamboo Ridge, ed. by Eric Chock and Darrell Lum, Bamboo Ridge Press, 1986

=== Scholarly Books ===
- Looking for Edward Gorey, University of Hawaiʻi Art Gallery, 2011
- Stan Musial: A Biography, Greenwood Press, 2007
- The Important Books: Children's Picture Books as Art and Literature, Scarecrow Press, 2005

Books Edited

- The Quietest Singing, (with Darrell H. Y. Lum and Estelle Enoki), University of Hawaiʻi Press, 2000
- A Hawaiʻi Anthology, University of Hawaiʻi Press, 1997
- The Ten Rules of Fishing, (with James Harstad), Bamboo Ridge Press, 1985
- British & European Literature, Vol. I, II, & III, 1983
