= Brief Messages from the Heart Museum =

Museum of letters in Fukui Prefecture, Japan

- 一筆啓上 日本一短い手紙の館
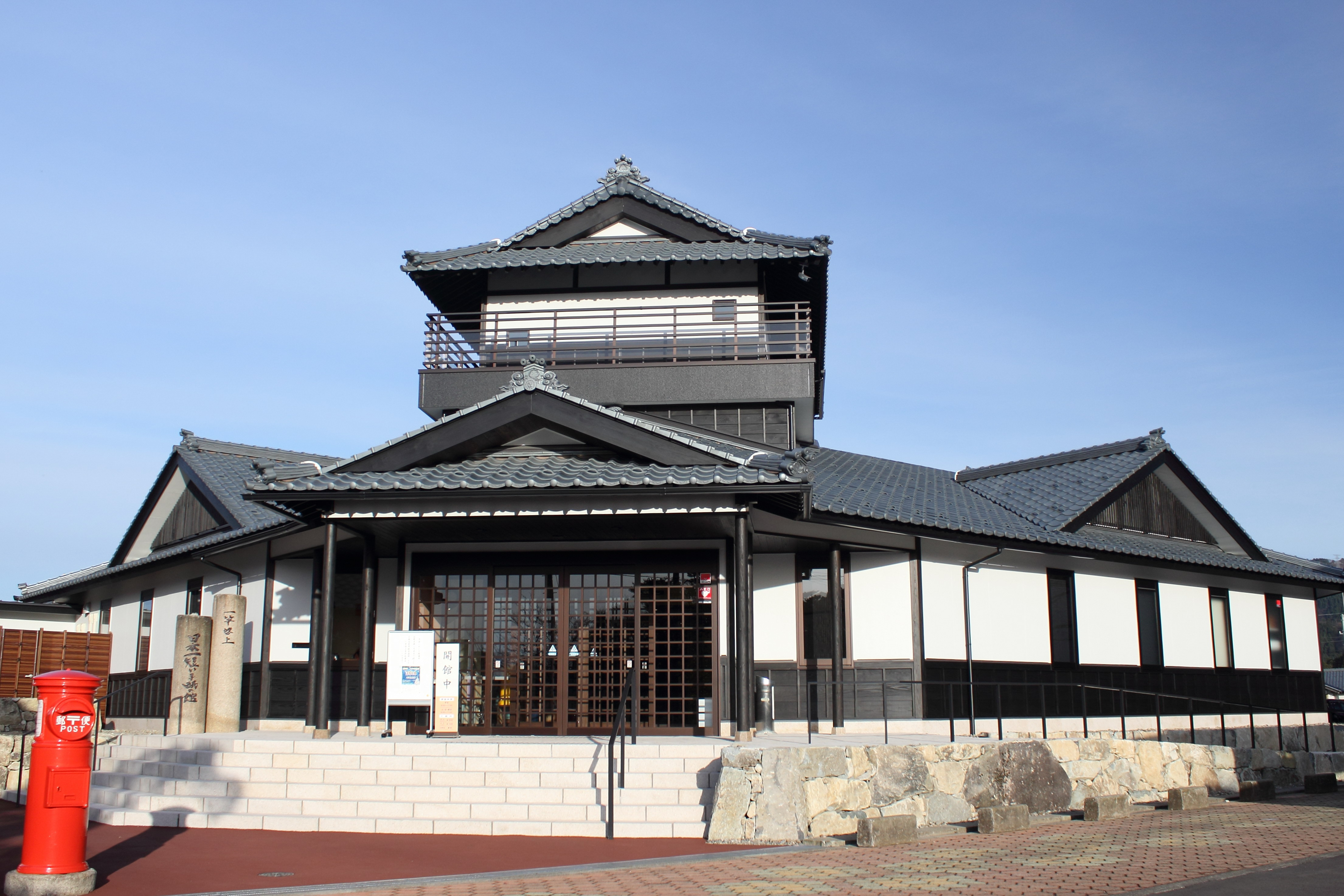
- Established: 23 August 2015
- Location: Sakai city, Fukui Prefecture, Japan
- Coordinates: 36.1537°N 136.2749°E
- Type: Museum
- Website: Official website

Brief Messages from the Heart Museum (一筆啓上 日本一短い手紙の館, Ippitsu keijo Nihonichi mijikai tegami no yakata) is a museum of letters in Sakai city, Fukui Prefecture, Japan. It opened on 23 August 2015.

== History ==
- 1993 - Open call for applications for poetry prize "One-stroke Enlightenment Award". The number of first applications was 32,236.
- 1994 - Foundation of the Maruoka Town Culture Promotion Agency was established.
- 1 April 2013 - Changed name to Maruoka Cultural Foundation from Maruoka Town Culture Promotion Agency.
- September 2013 - Maruoka Cultural Foundation announced a policy to make the former clinic site of Maruoka Castle west side about museum construction site. But this policy can not get the local consent because planned construction site hitting the former Uchibori (moat). So Maruoka Cultural Foundation changed museum construction site in the north side of Maruoka Castle Change to Foundation site.
- 6 June 2014 - Because Ishigaki of Maruoka Castle Ninomaru was excavated from the site of Maruoka Cultural Foundation, the construction site was changed in the parking lot on the north side of Sakai City Maruoka Library (the second change).
- 23 August 2015 - Brief Messages from the Heart Museum has opened.
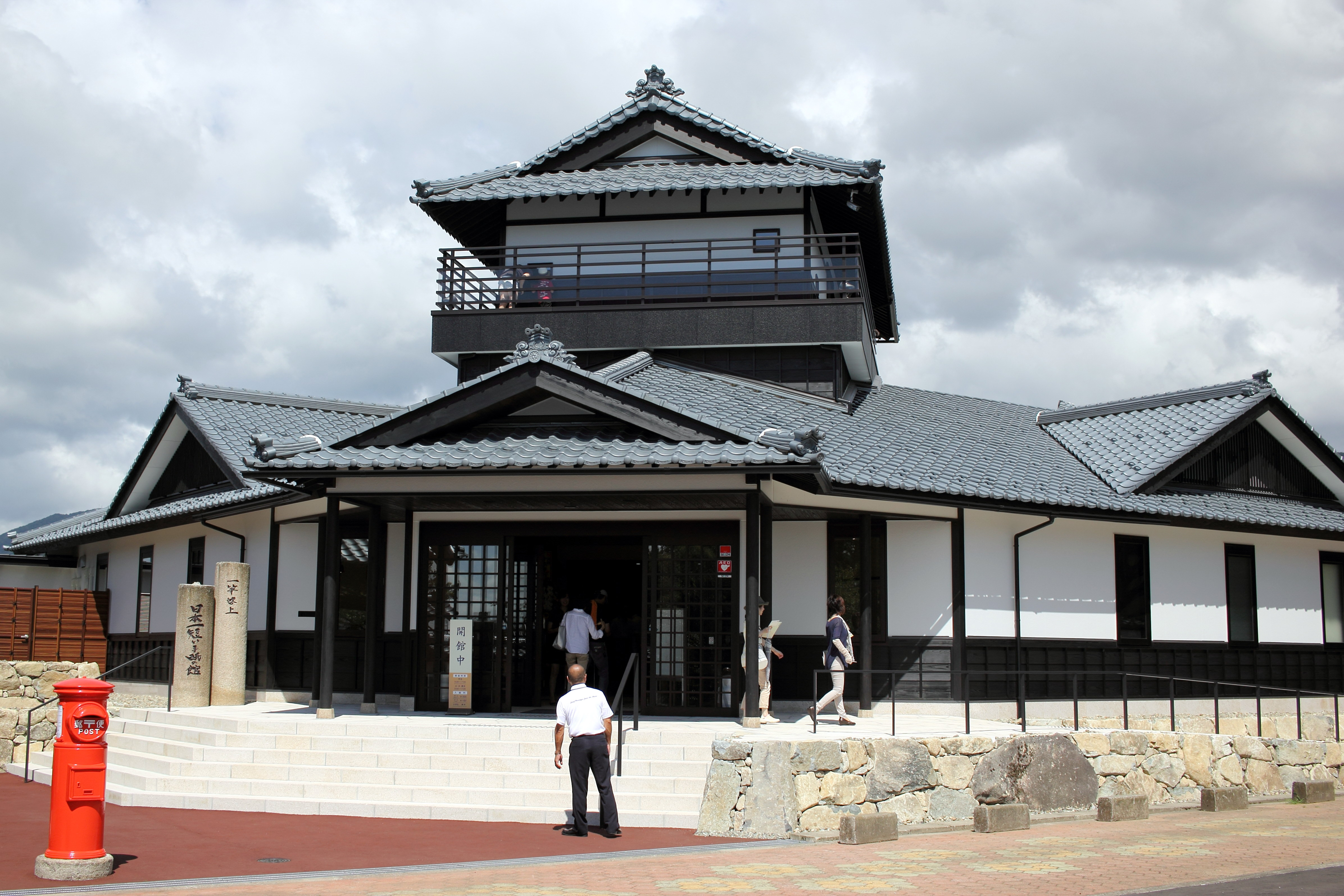
23 August 2015

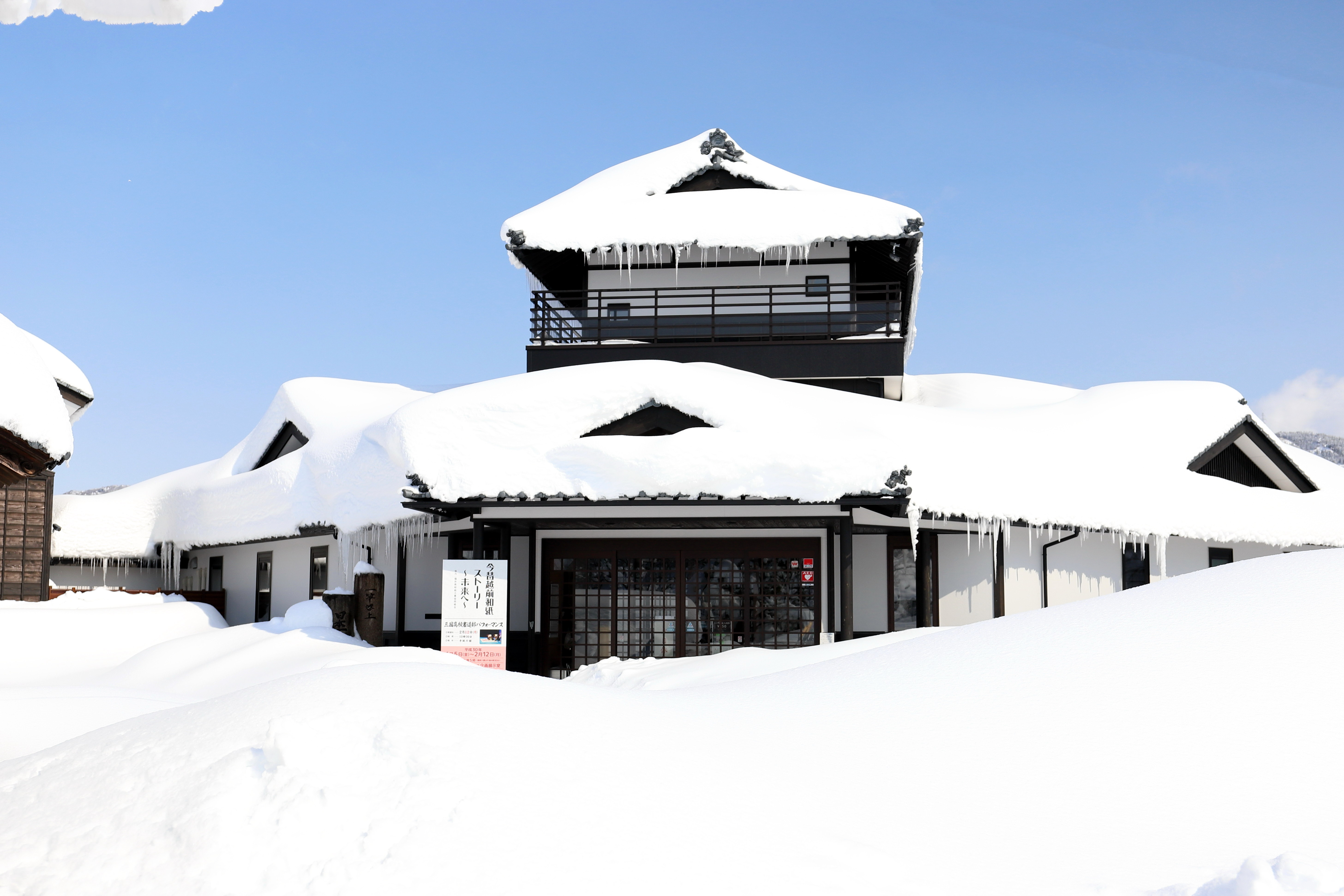
8 February 2018

== Facility ==
- Wooden two-story
- Total floor area 700 square meters
- Permanent exhibition room - You can see the prize-winning works so far along with the history of poetry prize "One-stroke Enlightenment Award".
- Planning exhibition room - A collaboration piece of the picture of the kamaboko board in Saiyo City, Ehime prefecture and the Japan's shortest letter is displayed.
- The old castle exhibition room - It is almost the same area as the third floor of the Maruoka castle tower, and you can watch a video about Sakai city.
- Fumi Garden - Cafe

== Usage guide ==
=== Opening time ===
- 9:00 - 17:00（admission is until 16:30）

=== Closing day ===
- Year-end and New Year. (from 29 December to 3 January)
- There is closed day for display change.

== Access ==
=== Railway ===
- 40 minutes by JR Fukui Station on the Keifuku Bus "Maruoka Line", 8 minutes by walk from the "Maruoka Castle" bus stop
- 20 minutes by JR Awara Onsen Station on the Keifuku Bus "Eiheiji and Tojinbo Line", 10 minutes by walk from "Castle Entrance" bus stop

=== Car ===
- 5 minutes from Hokuriku Expressway Maruoka Interchange

== One-stroke Enlightenment Award ==
=== One-stroke Enlightenment Award (1993–2002) ===
Year	Theme	Selection Committee
1st 1993	"Mother"	Jugo Kuroiwa (novelist), Machi Tawara (poet), Shinko Tokizane (Haiku group leader), Umenosuke Nakamura (Kabuki actor), Koichi Mori (archaeologist)
2nd 1994	"Family"	Jugo Kuroiwa (novelist), Machi Tawara (poet), Shinko Tokizane (Haiku group leader), Umenosuke Nakamura (Kabuki actor), Koichi Mori (archaeologist)
3rd 1995	"Love"	Jugo Kuroiwa (novelist), Machi Tawara (poet), Shinko Tokizane (Haiku group leader), Umenosuke Nakamura (Kabuki actor), Koichi Mori (archaeologist)
4th 1996	"Father"	Jugo Kuroiwa (novelist), Machi Tawara (poet), Shinko Tokizane (Haiku group leader), Umenosuke Nakamura (Kabuki actor), Koichi Mori (archaeologist)
5th 1997	"Thoughts for mother"	Jugo Kuroiwa (novelist), Machi Tawara (poet), Shinko Tokizane (Haiku group leader), Umenosuke Nakamura (Kabuki actor), Koichi Mori (archaeologist)
6th 1998	"Thoughts for Hometown"	Jugo Kuroiwa (novelist), Machi Tawara (poet), Shinko Tokizane (Haiku group leader), Umenosuke Nakamura (Kabuki actor), Koichi Mori (archaeologist)
7th 1999	"For Friend"	Jugo Kuroiwa (novelist), Machi Tawara (poet), Shinko Tokizane (Haiku group leader), Umenosuke Nakamura (Kabuki actor), Koichi Mori (archaeologist)
8th 2000	"For Me"	Jugo Kuroiwa (novelist), Machi Tawara (poet), Shinko Tokizane (Haiku group leader), Umenosuke Nakamura (Kabuki actor), Koichi Mori (archaeologist), Hitoshi Komuro (guest committee, singer)
9th 2001	"Life"	Jugo Kuroiwa (novelist), Machi Tawara (poet), Shinko Tokizane (Haiku group leader), Umenosuke Nakamura (Kabuki actor), Koichi Mori (archaeologist), Hitoshi Komuro (guest committee, singer)
10th 2002	"Emotions"	Jugo Kuroiwa (novelist), Machi Tawara (poet), Shinko Tokizane (Haiku group leader), Umenosuke Nakamura (Kabuki actor), Koichi Mori (archaeologist), Hitoshi Komuro (guest committee, singer)

=== New One-stroke Enlightenment Award (2003–) ===
Year	Theme	Selection Committee
1st 2003	"Roundtrip letter with Mother"	Hitoshi Komuro (singer), Mikirō Sasaki (poet), Chinatsu Nakayama (novelist), Yuji Nishi (novelist), Keiji Nakajima (Sumitomo Group)
2nd 2004	"Family"	Hitoshi Komuro (singer), Mikirō Sasaki (poet), Chinatsu Nakayama (novelist), Yuji Nishi (novelist), Mitsuru Iba (Sumitomo Group)
3rd 2005	"Love"	Hitoshi Komuro (singer), Mikirō Sasaki (poet), Chinatsu Nakayama (novelist), Yuji Nishi (novelist), Mitsuru Iba (Sumitomo Group)
4th 2006	"Father"	Hitoshi Komuro (singer), Mikirō Sasaki (poet), Chinatsu Nakayama (novelist), Yuji Nishi novelist), Mitsuru Iba (Sumitomo Group)
5th 2007	"Future"	Hitoshi Komuro (singer), Mikirō Sasaki (poet), Chinatsu Nakayama (novelist), Yuji Nishi (novelist), Mitsuru Iba (Sumitomo Group)
6th 2008	"Dream"	Hitoshi Komuro (singer), Mikirō Sasaki (poet), Chinatsu Nakayama (novelist), Yuji Nishi (novelist), Hisakazu Suzuki (Sumitomo Group)
7th 2009	"Laugh"	Hitoshi Komuro (singer), Mikirō Sasaki (poet), Chinatsu Nakayama (novelist), Yuji Nishi (novelist), Hisakazu Suzuki (Sumitomo Group)
8th 2010	"Tears"	Hitoshi Komuro (singer), Mikirō Sasaki (poet), Chinatsu Nakayama (novelist), Yuji Nishi (novelist), Hisakazu Suzuki (Sumitomo Group)
9th 2011	"Tomorrow"	Riyoko Ikeda (manga artist), Hitoshi Komuro (singer), Mikirō Sasaki (poet), Chinatsu Nakayama (novelist), Yuji Nishi (novelist), Toshimasa Hayashi (Sumitomo Group)
10th 2012	"Thank You"	Riyoko Ikeda(manga artist), Hitoshi Komuro (singer), Mikirō Sasaki (poet), Chinatsu Nakayama (novelist), Yuji Nishi (novelist), Toshimasa Hayashi (Sumitomo Group)
21st 2013	"Not Forget"	Riyoko Ikeda(manga artist), Hitoshi Komuro (singer), Mikirō Sasaki (poet), Chinatsu Nakayama (novelist), Yuji Nishi (novelist), Toshimasa Hayashi (Sumitomo Group)
22nd 2014	"Flower"	Riyoko Ikeda(manga artist), Hitoshi Komuro (singer), Mikirō Sasaki (poet), Chinatsu Nakayama (novelist), Kenji Shinmori(Sumitomo Group)
23th 2015	"Song"	Riyoko Ikeda(manga artist), Hitoshi Komuro (singer), Mikirō Sasaki (poet), Chinatsu Nakayama (novelist), Kenji Shinmori(Sumitomo Group)
24th 2016	"Sorry"	Hitoshi Komuro (singer), Mikirō Sasaki (poet), Natsu Miyashita (novelist), Kenji Shinmori(Sumitomo Group)
25th 2017	"Mother"	Hitoshi Komuro (singer), Mikirō Sasaki (poet), Natsu Miyashita (novelist), Kenji Shinmori(Sumitomo Group)
26th 2018	"For Teacher"	Hitoshi Komuro (singer), Mikirō Sasaki (poet), Itsuki Natsui (poet), Natsu Miyashita (novelist), Kenji Shinmori(Sumitomo Group)
27th 2019	"Four Seasons"	

== Surroundings ==
- Sakai City Maruoka Library—Adjacent to the letter hall. Attached Nakano Shigeharu memorial paperback.
