= Darrell H.Y. Lum =

Darrell H.Y. Lum (born 1950) is a fiction writer, playwright, teacher, and editor from Hawaiʻi, who co-founded Bamboo Ridge Press with Eric Chock.

== Early life and education ==
Lum was born in 1950 in Honolulu. Lum attended McKinley High School, and later the University of Hawaiʻi at Mānoa, where he earned his bachelor's in 1972, followed by an M.A. in Educational Communications in 1972 and a Ph.D. in Educational Foundations in 1997. Lum is known for his writings in Hawaiʻi Creole English, or Hawaiian Pidgin.

== Career ==
In 1991, Lum received the Elliot Cades Award for Literature. Prior to that, he received a fellowship in literature from the National Endowment for the Arts in 1989. Lum's Pass On, No Pass Back! earned the Association for Asian American Studies National Book Award in 1992. Darrell H.Y. Lum was also awarded the 1998 Hawaiʻi Book Publishers' Association Award for Excellence in Literature and another Association for Asian American Studies award in 2009 for the Outstanding Service Award. In 2001, Darrell H. Y. Lum, Joseph Stanton, and Estelle Enoki earned an honorable mention for the Ka Palapala Poʻokela Award for Excellence in Literature for their editing of "The Quietest Singing." Lum, along with other well-known Hawaiʻi playwrights like Edward Sakamoto and Victoria Nālani Kneubuhl, have helped shape the landscape of Hawaiʻi's local literature and theatre, bringing national attention to the Hawaiʻi stage. Many of Lum's writings have been turned into plays, or produced as plays for Kumu Kahua Theatre and Honolulu Theatre for Youth. In addition to writing short stories and plays in Hawaiian Pidgin, Lum supports the use of Pidgin in education, speaking on a panel at Hawaiʻi's first “Get Pidgin?: Summit on Pidgin and Education” in 2017. Lum continues to serve as editor with Bamboo Ridge Press.

== Bibliography ==
- Sun: Short Stories & Drama (1980)
- The Best of Bamboo Ridge (1986) (edited with Eric Chock)
- Pake: Writings by Chinese in Hawaii (1989) (edited with Eric Chock)
- Pass On, No Pass Back! (1990)
- The Best of Honolulu Fiction (1999) (edited with Eric Chock)
