= Juliet Kono =

American poet

Juliet Sanae Kono Lee
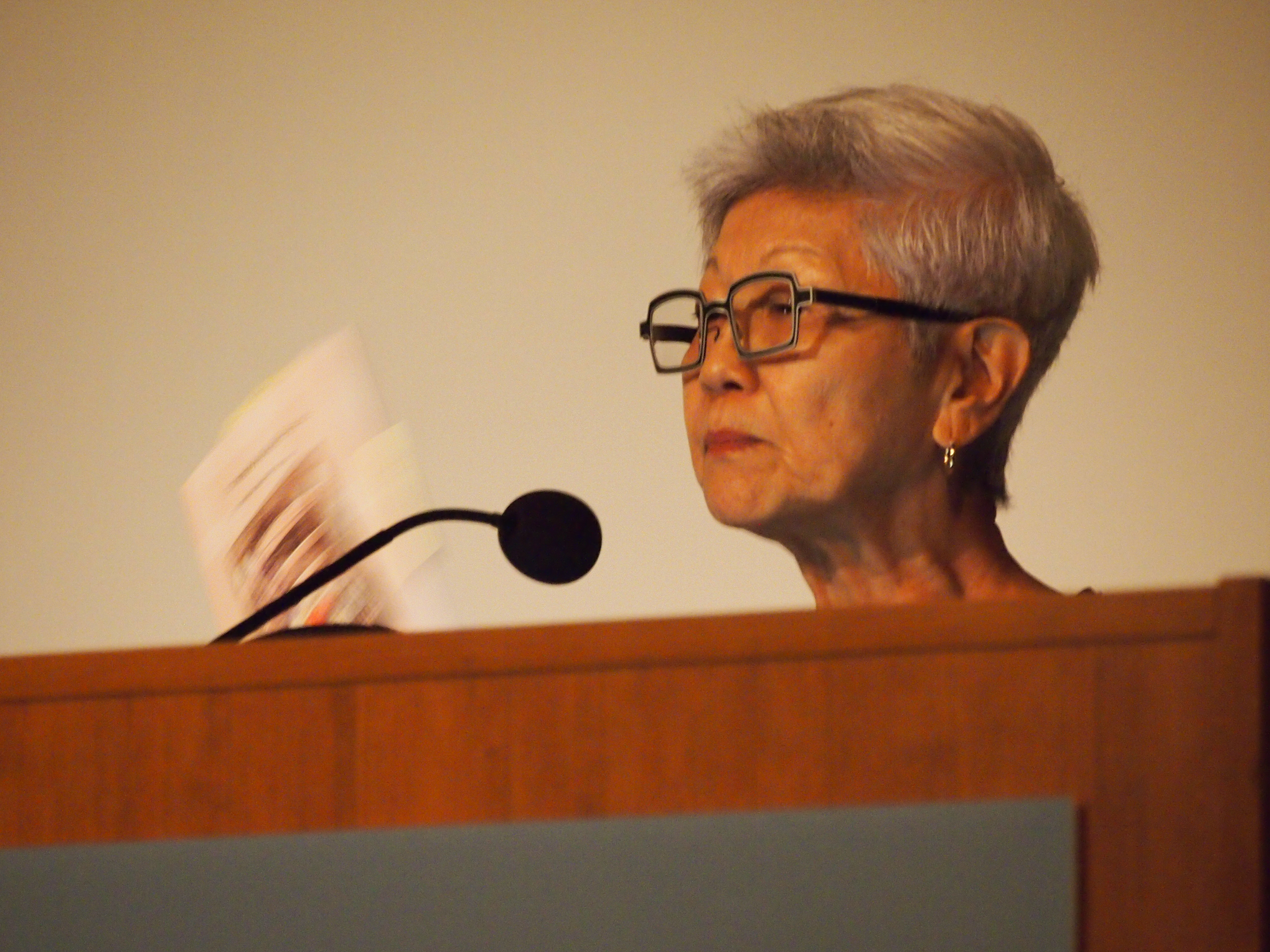
- Juliet Kono - reading at the Asian American Literature Festival (2017)
- Born: Juliet Sanae Asayama; 1943 (age 81–82); Hilo, Hawaii
- Other names: Juliet Lee
- Occupations: poet, author, and instructor

Juliet Kono (born 1943) is a Hawaiʻian poet and novelist.

== Early life and education ==
Kono was born in 1943 in Hilo, Hawaiʻi to Yoshinori and Atsuko Asayama; her grandparents were immigrants from Japan. One of her earliest memories is from the April 1 tsunami resulting from the 1946 Aleutian Islands earthquake; her family lost their home, which was near the water's edge where Liliʻuokalani Gardens is today, and were forced to live near her grandparents, who operated a small sugar cane plantation in Kaiwiki. She was raised as a Shin Buddhist, and her mother and grandmother were active members of Honpa Hongwanji Hilo Betsuin.

After graduating from Hilo High School, she moved to Honolulu, where she attended the University of Hawaii, but dropped out and started a family, then worked as a police radio dispatcher before she received her Bachelor (1988) and Master of Arts (1990) degrees from University of Hawaii at Manoa; as an adult student, she earned her BA and graduated with her son. Kono published her first book of poems, Hilo Rains, in 1988, as an undergraduate at Manoa.

Kono is retired and worked as an English instructor at Leeward Community College. She is married to David Lee, who was a fellow dispatcher.

== Career ==
She took up writing while working at a former job as a police dispatcher, publishing as Juliet S. Kono. Kono has also taught at guest workshops for universities and colleges including Wellesley College and the Massachusetts Institute of Technology.

She is considered a member of the Bamboo Ridge group of writers and also is an ordained Buddhist minister.

== Awards ==
Kono received a Creative Artist Exchange Fellowship from the Japan-United States Friendship Commission in 1998 and the Hawaii Award for Literature in 2005. Her novel Anshu: Dark Sorrow received the 2011 Ka Palapala Po'okela Book Award for Literature.

== Bibliography ==
- — (1988). Hilo Rains (PDF). Honolulu: Bamboo Ridge Press. ISBN 978-0-910043-15-1. LCCN 88-24236. (published as a special double issue of Bamboo Ridge: The Hawaii Writer's Quarterly, issues 37 and 38, Winter & Spring 1988)
- Kono, Juliet S.; Song, Cathy, eds. (1991). Sister Stew: Poetry and Fiction by Women. Bamboo Ridge Press. ISBN 0-910043-22-1.
- — (1995). Tsunami Years (PDF). Bamboo Ridge Press. ISBN 0-910043-35-3. (published as a special double issue of Bamboo Ridge, issues 65 and 66)
- — (2004). Hoʻolulu Park and the Pepsodent Smile, and Other Stories. Bamboo Ridge Press. ISBN 0-910043-70-1.
- — (2010). Anshu: Dark Sorrow. Bamboo Ridge Press. ISBN 978-0-910043-83-0.
- Yamasaki Toyama, Jean; Kono, Juliet S.; Inoshita, Ann; Passion, Christy (2011). No Choice but to Follow. Bamboo Ridge Press. ISBN 978-0-910043-82-3. (special issue of Bamboo Ridge #96)
- Passion, Christy; Inoshita, Ann; Kono, Juliet S.; Yamasaki Toyama, Jean (2017). What We Must Remember. Bamboo Ridge Press. ISBN 978-0-910043-97-7.

=== Works for young audiences ===
- — Fukawa, Emi (illus.) (1997). How the Ocean Fooled Us. ISBN 9780021825059.
- — Trang, Winson (illus.) (2000). A Day on the Cyclo. ISBN 9780021477043.
- — Chang, Heidi (illus.) (2000). The Pancake Place. ISBN 9780021476985.
- — Fujitake, Dennis (illus.) (2005). The Bravest ʻOpihi. ISBN 9781933067636.
