= Renshi =

Renshi (連詩, renshi, "linked poetry") is a form of collaborative poetry pioneered by Makoto Ōoka in the 1980s. It is a development of traditional Japanese renga and renku, but unlike these it does not adhere to traditional strictures on length, rhythm, and diction. Renshi are typically composed by a group of Japanese and foreign poets collaborating in the writing process in sessions lasting several days. In addition to Ooka, poets who have participated in renshi include James Lasdun, Charles Tomlinson, Hiromi Itō, Shuntarō Tanikawa, Jerome Rothenberg, Joseph Stanton, Wing Tek Lum, Karin Kiwus and Mikirō Sasaki.
