= Rodney Morales =

American writer

- Occupations: Novelist, professor
- Writing career
- Genre: Literature in Hawaii
- Notable works: The Speed of Darkness, When the Shark Bites

Rodney Morales is an American fiction writer, editor, literary scholar, musician, and Professor in the Creative Writing Program of the Department of English at the University of Hawaii. In both his creative and critical writing, he is concerned with contemporary multi-ethnic Hawaii society, particularly social relations between its residents of Native Hawaiian, Japanese, Caucasian, and Puerto Rican descent; the 1970s "Hawaiian Renaissance" movement and the disappearance of its legendary cultural icon George Helm of Protect Kaho'olawe Ohana (PKO); and the postmodern juxtaposition of popular artistic forms (the detective novel, cinema, crime fiction, rock music) with high literature. Shaped by genre fiction of the postwar period, his regional stories influenced that of Generation X/millennial authors such as Chris McKinney and Alexei Melnick, "urban Honolulu" novelists known for their gritty, realistic approaches to depicting crime, drugs, and lower-class life in the islands.

Though he had authored earlier works of short fiction, Morales first came to notice on the Hawai`i literary scene when he edited Ho`i Ho`i Hou: A Tribute to George Helm and Kimo Mitchell, for Bamboo Ridge Press (1984). During the post-Statehood period from the 1960s through the 1990s, in Hawai`i publishing circles and English classes, "local" literature of the islands had been largely limited to, first, European American fiction and poetry by or about haole residents of Hawai`i, and, later, "pidgin" (Hawai`i Creole English) literature set in Hawai`i, largely by or about Asian immigrants and their descendants. Morales, along with fellow writer-editors Richard Hamasaki and Dennis Kawaharada, were key figures in the "local literature" movement who actively promoted Native Hawaiian writing and storytelling in the late twentieth-century, publishing community.

Morales wrote his first novel, When the Shark Bites (2002), over a six-year period. He drew from actual events in Hawaii social and political history—such as the suspicious vanishing of Helm and fellow Native Hawaiian activist Kimo Mitchell in the late 1970s, and the Hawaiian sovereignty movement which exploded by the 1990s—blending known, local figures into fictionalized characters within a multiple-perspective, mystery/crime genre story. Literary scholar Susan Najita found similarities in the book's thematic content with the writer's collection of short stories (The Speed of Darkness, 1988), calling the millennial novel "an extension of this earlier work in both its fictionalization of the events following Helm's disappearance and in Morales's deft interweaving of history, colonial resistance movements, popular culture, and native Hawaiian tradition." When the Shark Bites is a modern-day detective story in which an indigenous Hawaiian doctoral student, Alika, investigates the mysterious disappearance of native Hawaiian activist Keoni in the late 1970s. Morales has said of the technique of combining regional history with mainstream genre fiction, "A novel is a way to bring in all the different worlds I know."

His second novel, For A Song (2016), blends noir, mystery, and detective-fiction genre tropes, against the backdrop of political scandal and police corruption in contemporary Honolulu. Morales' protagonist, the hard-boiled detective David "Kawika" Apana, is consulted by a Native Hawaiian, female activist and filmmaker, whose case sends him from urban Honolulu to the semi-rural windward and north coasts of O`ahu island, into the shadier, complex layers of Hawaii society about which few know and fewer even dare speak. Morales has given public talks about how he uses local Hawaii, historical, archival, and news/journalistic research to breathe life into his characters.

Morales won the prestigious Grand Prize of the Honolulu Magazine Fiction Contest twice. In 2004, he was selected for the "established writer" category of the Cades Award for Literature, one of two key literary honors offered by the Hawai'i Literary Arts Council.

== Selected works ==
- Ho'i Ho'i Hou: A Tribute to George Helm and Kimo Mitchell (edited volume, 1984, Lawrence Brown Award).
- The Speed of Darkness (short stories, 1988).
- "Literature." 1998. In Multicultural Hawai'i: The Fabric of a Multiethnic Society. Edited by Michael Haas. 107-129. New York: Garland Publishing, Inc.
- When the Shark Bites (novel, 2002).
- For a Song (novel, 2016).

== See also ==
- List of Puerto Ricans
- Puerto Rican immigration to Hawaii
