= All I Asking for is My Body =

1975 novel by Milton Murayama

- Author: Milton Muroyama
- Publisher: Supa
- Publication date: 1975

All I Asking for Is My Body is a novel written by Milton Murayama. It was originally published by The Supa Press in San Francisco in 1975 and rereleased by the University of Hawaii Press in 1988. It won the American Book Award of the Before Columbus Foundation in 1980. It was adapted for the theater and performed in San Francisco and Honolulu in 1989 and 1999 respectively.

== Plot ==
=== Part One: I'll Crack Your Head, Kotsun ===
Kiyoshi (Kiyo) Oyama lives in Pepelau, Hawaii with his four siblings and parents. Kiyo and his two friends, Mitsunobu Kato (Mit) and Nobuyuki Asakatsu (Skats), recently have been playing with Makot, an older kid ostracized from the rest of his age group and Makot has become their gang leader. He frequently invites Mit, Skats, and Kiyo to lunch at his home where he and his family are the only Japanese people in a Filipino camp in Pepelau. Kiyo's parents tell him he isn't allowed to eat with Makot anymore because people will make assumptions about their family. Kiyo agrees.

Later, when the boys want to make extra money, Makot suggests they sell mangos and coconuts they've stolen. After they are caught, Kiyo's father forbids him to see Makot again. When Kiyoshi goes to Makot's house to end their friendship he sees Makot's mother dressed strangely, not realizing she is a prostitute.

=== Part Two: The Substitute ===
Kiyo's mother gets sick after having all of her teeth pulled at the dentist. She believes that if she dies she will have been punished as a substitute for a family member's past misdeeds.

Obaban is the family black sheep but also the closest member to Kiyo's mother. Worried about his mother, Kiyo brings Obaban to her from Kahana in a taxi. He asks Obaban if she believes his mother is being punished as a substitute and she says that if that's the case, someone could just as easily be her substitute as well. Very soon after she leaves, Obaban has a stroke and passes away. Kiyo believes she was his mother's substitute as his mother is now recovering.

=== Part Three: All I Asking For Is My Body ===
Kiyo's parents have another baby and his father quits his job as a fisherman to move their family to a sugarcane plantation near Kahana. Kiyo and his older brother Toshio (Tosh) are forced to quit school and work in the cane fields to help the family like their father did when he was younger. Kiyoshi's parents' filial duty required them to have given much of their income to his paternal grandfather when they first immigrated to Hawaii and because of this, the family is now six thousand dollars in debt. They expect Tosh and Kiyo to pay this as their own filial duty. Tosh argues that his grandfather stole the money from his parents and that he and Kiyo shouldn't be required to help them, creating tension in the family.

Tosh and Kiyo start boxing in matches around the island and in Honolulu. Tosh eventually is offered the chance to box professionally but turns it down to continue fulfilling his filial obligations to his family. When Tosh gets married he gives one third of his earnings, and all of his wife's, to them for the first year.

After Pearl Harbor, Kiyo joins the Army as a way to make money for his family and as a way off the plantation. Kiyo watches the men gambling in the barracks and devises the best strategy to win at craps. The novel ends with Kiyoshi winning enough money in the barracks to pay off his family's debts and sending it to Tosh.

== Reception ==
Murayama's novel was praised for its depiction of Japanese Americans living in the Hawaiian plantation system and his use of language throughout the novel. It uses a mix of pidgin and traditional Japanese, and pidgin, Hawaiian Creole, and traditional English to differentiate environments and illustrate character relationships. It is also celebrated for telling the story of a Japanese American family living in Hawaii on the cusp of and during World War II and for how its depiction of the pressures of being a young Japanese American during that time.
