= Makoto Ōoka =

Japanese poet and literary critic (1931–2017)

- 大岡 信
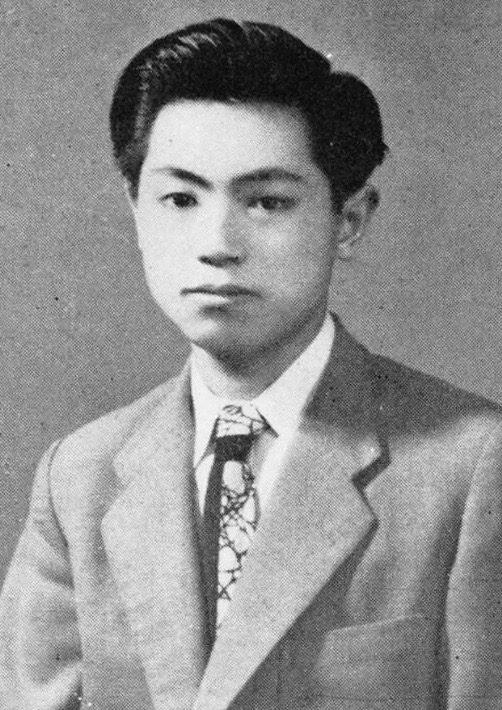
- Born: February 16, 1931; Mishima, Shizuoka
- Died: April 5, 2017 (aged 86)
- Occupations: Poet and literary critic
- Writing career
- Notable works: The Japanese and Mt. Fuji, Uta no saijiki, A Play of Mirrors: Eight Major Poets of Modern Japan
- Notable awards: Cultural Prize of the Municipality of Tokyo, Officier de l'Ordre des Arts et des Lettres, Japan Academy of the Arts Prize for poetry and criticism
- Literary movement: Renshi

Makoto Ōoka (大岡 信, Ōoka Makoto; February 16, 1931, in Mishima, Shizuoka – April 5, 2017) was a Japanese poet and literary critic. He pioneered the collaborative poetic form renshi in the 1990s, in which he has collaborated with such well-known literary figures as Charles Tomlinson, James Lasdun, Joseph Stanton, Shuntarō Tanikawa and Mikirō Sasaki.

== Asahi Shimbun ==
Ōoka's poetry column was published without a break seven days a week for more than 20 years on the front page of Asahi Shimbun, which is Japan's leading national newspaper.

== Awards ==
- 1993: Cultural Prize of the Municipality of Tokyo
- 1993: Officier de l'Ordre des Arts et des Lettres (France)
- 1995: Japan Academy of the Arts Prize for poetry and criticism
- 1996: Asahi Prize
- 1996: Golden Wreath of the Struga Poetry Evenings, Macedonia
- 1997: Cultural Merit Award
- 2002: Japan Foundation Award

== Bibliography ==
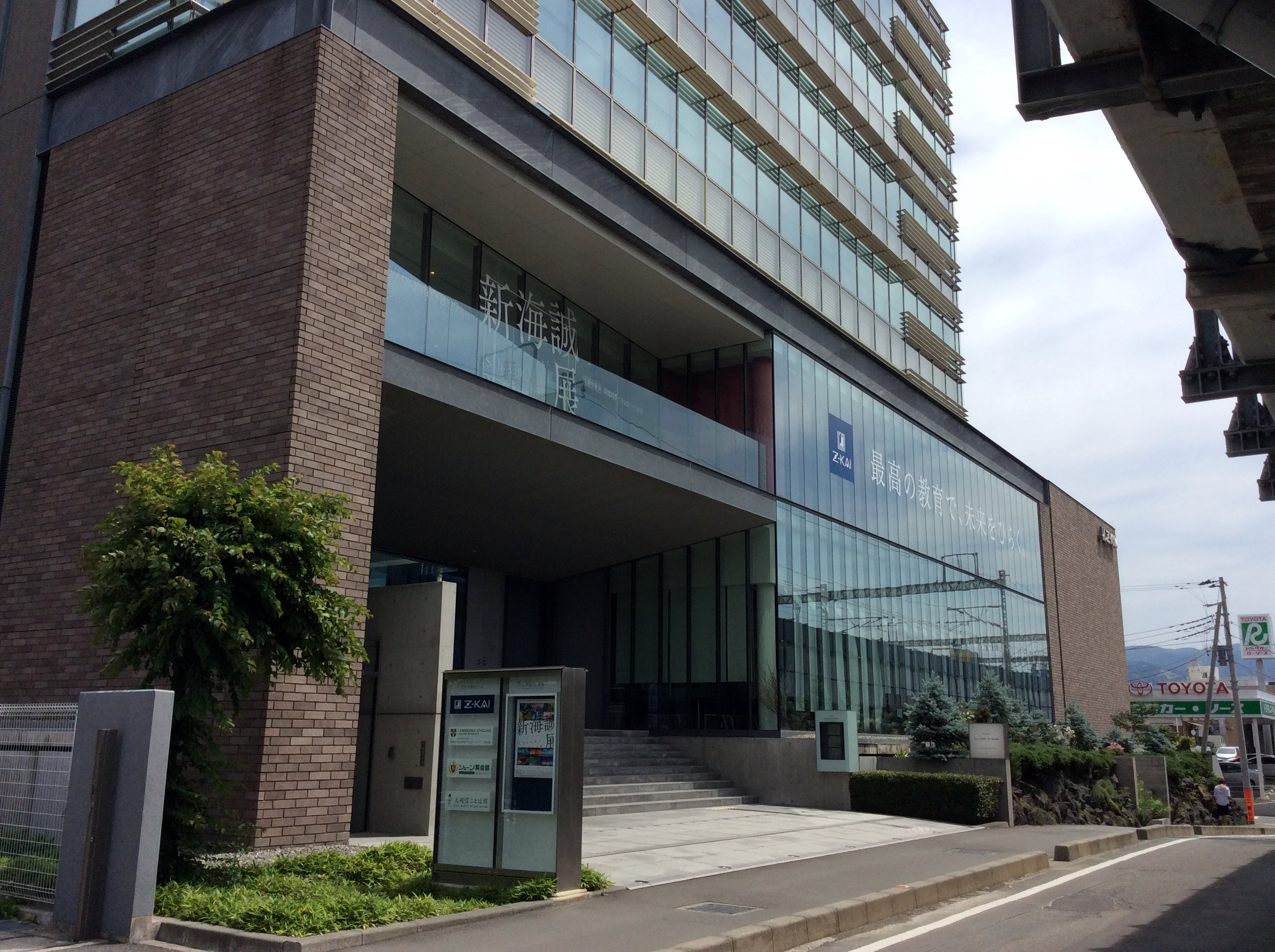
A view of Ooka Makoto Kotoba Museum

- The Japanese and Mt. Fuji (Tokyo: Graphic-sha, 1984)
- Uta no saijiki (Gakushu Kenkyusha, 1985)
- A Play of Mirrors: Eight Major Poets of Modern Japan (Santa Fe: Katydid Books, 1987)
- The World of Sam Francis (Ogawa Art Foundation, 1987)
- A String Around Autumn = Aki O Tatamu Himo: Selected Poems, 1952–1980 (Santa Fe: Katydid Books, 1988)
- Gustave Moreau Caste of Dreams (Tokyo: Parco, 1988)
- Elegy and the Benediction: Selected Poems 1947–1989 (Santa Fe: Katydid Books, 1991)
- The Colors of Poetry: Essays on Classic Japanese Verse (Santa Fe: Katydid Books, 1991. Co-authors: Thomas Fitzsimmons, Donald Keene, Takako Lento, Thomas Lento)
- A Poet's Anthology: The Range of Japanese Poetry (Santa Fe: Katydid Books, 1994. Translated into English by Janine Beichman)
- What the Kite Thinks: A Linked Poem, by Makoto Ōoka, Wing Tek Lum, Joseph Stanton, and Jean Yamasaki Toyama (Manoa: University of Hawaii Press, 1994)
- Beneath the Sleepless Tossing of the Planets (Hawaii: Univ of Hawaii Press, 1995. With Tsujii Takashi)
- The Poetry and Poetics of Ancient Japan (Santa Fe: Katydid Books, 1997. Translated into English by Thomas Fitzsimmons)
- Dans l'océan du silence (Paris: Voix d'encre, 1998. Translated into French by Dominique Palmé)
- Oriori no Uta: Poems for all seasons (Tokyo: Kodansha International, 2000. Translated into English by Janine Beichman)
- Love Songs from the Man'yoshu: Selections from a Japanese Classic (Tokyo: Kodansha International, 2000)
- Voix d'Argile: Fance Franck (Paris: Bayle a Montelimar, 2001)
