= Mikirō Sasaki =

Japanese poet, lecturer and travel writer (born 1947)

- 佐々木 幹郎
- Born: October 20, 1947 (age 78); Tenri, Nara, Japan
- Occupations: Poet and travel author
- Writing career
- Language: Japanese; English
- Notable work: Shisya no Muchi
- Notable awards: 2003 Yomiuri Prize

Mikirō Sasaki (佐々木 幹郎, Sasaki Mikirō; October 20, 1947) is a Japanese poet and travel author, winner of the 2003 Yomiuri Prize for travel essays. Sasaki won the award for his book Ajia kaidō kikō: umi wa toshi de aru (A Travel Journal of the Asian Seaboard, 2002). He has published more than a score of poetry collections and travel books. His Demented flute: selected poems, 1967-1986 was published in English in 1988. In 2012, his poetry collection Ashita(Tomorrow) won the 2012 Sakutarō Hagiwara Prize, one of the most prestigious prizes in the world of Japanese poetry. He was a Part-time Lecturer in music literature at Tokyo University of the Arts, Graduate School of Music.

== Biography ==
Sasaki was born in Tenri in Nara, grew up in Fujiidera in Osaka, Japan, attending Fujiidera Elementary School, Osaka Municipal Hannan Junior High School, and Otemae Prefectural Senior High School. He was enrolled at Doshisha University in Kyoto, majoring in philosophy. While there he wrote for the college poetry magazine Moby Dick, and his first collection of poems, Shisya no Muchi: (Whiplash of the Dead, 死者の鞭, was published in 1970 while he was still in college.

In 1976, Sasaki wrote a script for independent film production, Cinema Nesance, about the friendship of the poet Chūya Nakahara and the critic Hideo Kobayashi. It was called Honey Sleep and was directed by Hisaya Iwasa. Since then he has written a number of screenplays, including a 1990 script for NHK (Japan Broadcasting Corporation) television which won a special award at the Golden Prague International Television Festival (Mezinárodni Televizni Festival Zlatá Praha).

In the 1970s, his experiments with a casual, colloquial style coupled with intellectual rigor helped to shape one major direction that Japanese poetry would take in subsequent generations. Indeed, his writing provided nourishment to a number of other writers.

He has travelled widely. In 1984 he was a visiting poet at Oakland University in Michigan. In 1988, he travelled to Nepal, Tibet and Shanghai. His travelogues and poetic style introduced many in Japan to both the wonders of the Himalayas, and the modern, and very different, culture of the largest city in China. He has been active in the field of collaborative poetry, writing renshi under the guidance of Makoto Ōoka.

Professionally, he was the senior editor of the collected works of Chūya Nakahara, which were published between 2000 and 2004, and he lectured at various liberal arts and music colleges and universities through 2007. Sasaki sat for several years on the selection committee for the Chuya Nakahara Prize. He frequently represents Japanese poetry overseas at international poetry festivals and other events. He is also an accomplished photographer.

== Awards ==
- 1988 the 10th Suntory Foundation "Cultural Award" for his work on Chūya Nakahara
- 1990 special award for screenplay at Grand Prix Golden Prague
- 1992 the 22nd Jun Takami Award for his collection of poems entitled The Honey-Hunter, published the previous year
- 2003 the 55th Yomiuri Literature Prize in travel literature for A Travel Journal of the Asian Seaboard
- 2012 the 20th Sakutaro Hagiwara Prize for his poetry collection Ashita (Tomorrow)
