= Bamboo Ridge =

- Discipline: Literary journal
- Language: English
- Edited by: Eric Chock and Darrell H.Y. Lum

Publication details
- History: 1978–present
- Publisher: Bamboo Ridge Press (United States)

Standard abbreviations
- ISO 4: Bamboo Ridge

Indexing
- ISSN: 0733-0308

Links
- Journal homepage

Bamboo Ridge (in full Bamboo Ridge: Journal of Hawai'i Literature and Arts) is a Hawaii-based literary journal and nonprofit press. It was founded in 1978 by Eric Chock and Darrell H.Y. Lum to publish works by and for the people of Hawaii. In the United States, Bamboo Ridge is one of the longest-running small presses, and is one of the oldest in Hawaii. It was named after a popular fishing spot on Oahu. It currently publishes two volumes a year: a literary journal of poetry and fiction featuring work by both emerging and established writers and a book by a single author or an anthology focused on a special theme. Both the journal and book are available singly or by subscription.

Lois-Ann Yamanaka, Lee Cataluna, Rodney Morales, Gary Pak, Wing Tek Lum, and Nora Okja Keller are among the writers Bamboo Ridge has published. Yamanaka in particular has credited some of her literary success to the press. Anthologies have also been guest edited by Cathy Song and Naomi Shihab Nye.

== History ==
Chock and Lum started Bamboo Ridge in 1978 after they noticed that local authors weren't being published in major literary journals. They published four slim volumes every year. They currently only publish two, an anthology and a single-author collection. As the press grew, so did the size of the volumes.

In 2014 the press partnered with the Hawaii Council for the Humanities to offer discounts to middle- and high-school students purchasing their books. This is part of an effort to increase the amount of local literature read in the school system.

That year, Chock and Lum retired as editors. Since then every issue of the journal has been edited by guest editors.

=== Digital archive ===
In 2020, they released a digital archive to preserve past issues. The archive was partially funded by the Hawaii Council for the Humanities and is hosted in a Kapiolani Community College repository.

== Awards ==
In 2009, the press received an Outstanding Service Award from the Association for Asian American Studies.

== Book publications ==
- Nakano, Jiro, 'Outcry from the Inferno: Atomic Bomb Tanka Anthology, Honolulu, Hawaii, Bamboo Ridge Press © 1995 ISBN 0-910043-38-8 [104 pp. 103 tanka by 103 poets]
- Wang, Wayne, and Diane Mei Lin Mark, Chan is Missing: A Film By Wayne Wang, With Introduction and Screen Notes by Diane Mei Lin Mark (Honolulu: Bamboo Ridge Press, 1984), ISBN 0-910043-06-X. A special issue of Bamboo Ridge, The Hawaii Writers' Quarterly (the full title at the time), No. 23, Summer 1984.
- Kikkawa, Scott, Kona Winds (Honolulu: Bamboo Ridge Press, 2020), ISBN 978-1-943756-02-5. A hard-boiled noir murder mystery featuring a Japanese American Detective set in Honolulu of 1953.
