= Daiki Susumu =

American sumo wrestler (1973–2005)

Personal information
- Native name: 大喜進
- Born: Percy Pomaikai Kipapa; July 16, 1973 Kailua, Hawaii, U.S.
- Died: May 16, 2005 (aged 31) Kahaluʻu, Hawaii, U.S.
- Height: 1.92 m (6 ft 3 1/2 in)
- Weight: 221 kg (487 lb)

Sport
- Sport: Sumo
- Retired: January 1998
- Heya: Azumazeki
- Record: 153-119-19
- Debut: November 1991
- Highest rank: Juryo 10 (November 1995)
- Championships: 2 (Makushita)

Daiki Susumu (大喜進, Daiki Susumu) (born Percy Pomaikai Kipapa, July 16, 1973 – May 16, 2005) was a sumo wrestler from Hawaii, United States. His sumo stable was Azumazeki. His height was 192 cm (6 ft 3 and a half in) and his peak weight was 224 kg (494 lbs). His highest rank was jūryō 10.

== Career ==
Born in Kailua, Oahu, he joined Azumazeki stable in November 1991, a few months after high school graduation. His first shikona was Wakataisei, with a change to Daiki in 1993. His career record was 153 wins against 119 losses, with 19 bouts missed due to injury over 38 tournaments. His peak weight of 224 kilograms (494 lbs) means he ranks equal seventeenth in the list of heaviest sumo wrestlers. He was a former tsukebito or personal attendant to fellow Hawaiian Akebono Tarō, whom he credited for helping him reach the sekitori ranks. He was ranked in the jūryō division for four tournaments from September 1995 to March 1996. He retired from sumo in 1998, due to appendicitis and knee injuries. He was fluent in Japanese and after returning to his home in Waikane, Oahu according to his mother he worked for a tour company and in lomilomi massage. At the time of his death he had become addicted to methamphetamines.

== Death ==
He was found dead from multiple stab wounds in a truck in Kahaluu, Hawaii. He had been killed by his Castle High School friend, Kealiiokalani Meheula, in a dispute over money. Meheula claimed self-defense but was found guilty of second-degree murder and sentenced to life imprisonment on September 7, 2006.

His death was the subject of a book by Mark Panek, published in 2011 as Big Happiness: The Life and Death of a Modern Hawaiian Warrior; "Big Happiness" was the translation of Kipapa's sumo shikona of Daiki.

== Career record ==
Daiki Susumu
| Year | January Hatsu basho, Tokyo | March Haru basho, Osaka | May Natsu basho, Tokyo | July Nagoya basho, Nagoya | September Aki basho, Tokyo | November Kyūshū basho, Fukuoka |
|---|---|---|---|---|---|---|
| 1991 | x | x | x | x | x | (Maezumo) |
| 1992 | West Jonokuchi #32; 5–2 | East Jonidan #104; 5–2 | West Jonidan #58; 4–3 | West Jonidan #32; 4–3 | West Jonidan #8; 5–2 | East Sandanme #75; 3–4 |
| 1993 | East Sandanme #92; 4–3 | East Sandanme #72; 4–3 | West Sandanme #52; 5–2 | West Sandanme #20; 2–5 | West Sandanme #47; 4–3 | East Sandanme #36; 4–3 |
| 1994 | West Sandanme #23; 4–3 | West Sandanme #10; 5–2 | East Makushita #47; 2–5 | East Sandanme #12; 4–3 | East Makushita #60; 4–3 | East Makushita #48; 3–4 |
| 1995 | West Sandanme #2; 5–2 | East Makushita #41; 6–1 | East Makushita #19; 5–2 | West Makushita #8; 7–0; Champion | East Jūryō #13; 8–7 | West Jūryō #10; 7–8 |
| 1996 | West Jūryō #11; 8–7 | West Jūryō #10; 3–12 | West Makushita #5; 5–2 | West Makushita #1; 2–5 | East Makushita #15; 5–2 | West Makushita #8; 0–2–5 |
| 1997 | West Makushita #43; 7–0; Champion | West Makushita #3; 3–4 | East Makushita #7; 3–4 | West Makushita #13; 2–5 | West Makushita #28; Sat out due to injury 0–0–7 | East Sandanme #8; Sat out due to injury 0–0–7 |
| 1998 | East Sandanme #68; Retired; 6–1 | x | x | x | x | x |
Record given as wins–losses–absences Top division champion Top division runner-up Retired Lower divisions Non-participation Sanshō key: F=Fighting spirit; O=Outstanding performance; T=Technique Also shown: ★=Kinboshi; P=Playoff(s); Divisions: Makuuchi — Jūryō — Makushita — Sandanme — Jonidan — Jonokuchi Makuuchi ranks: Yokozuna — Ōzeki — Sekiwake — Komusubi — Maegashira

== See also ==
- List of past sumo wrestlers
