= Milton Murayama =

American writer

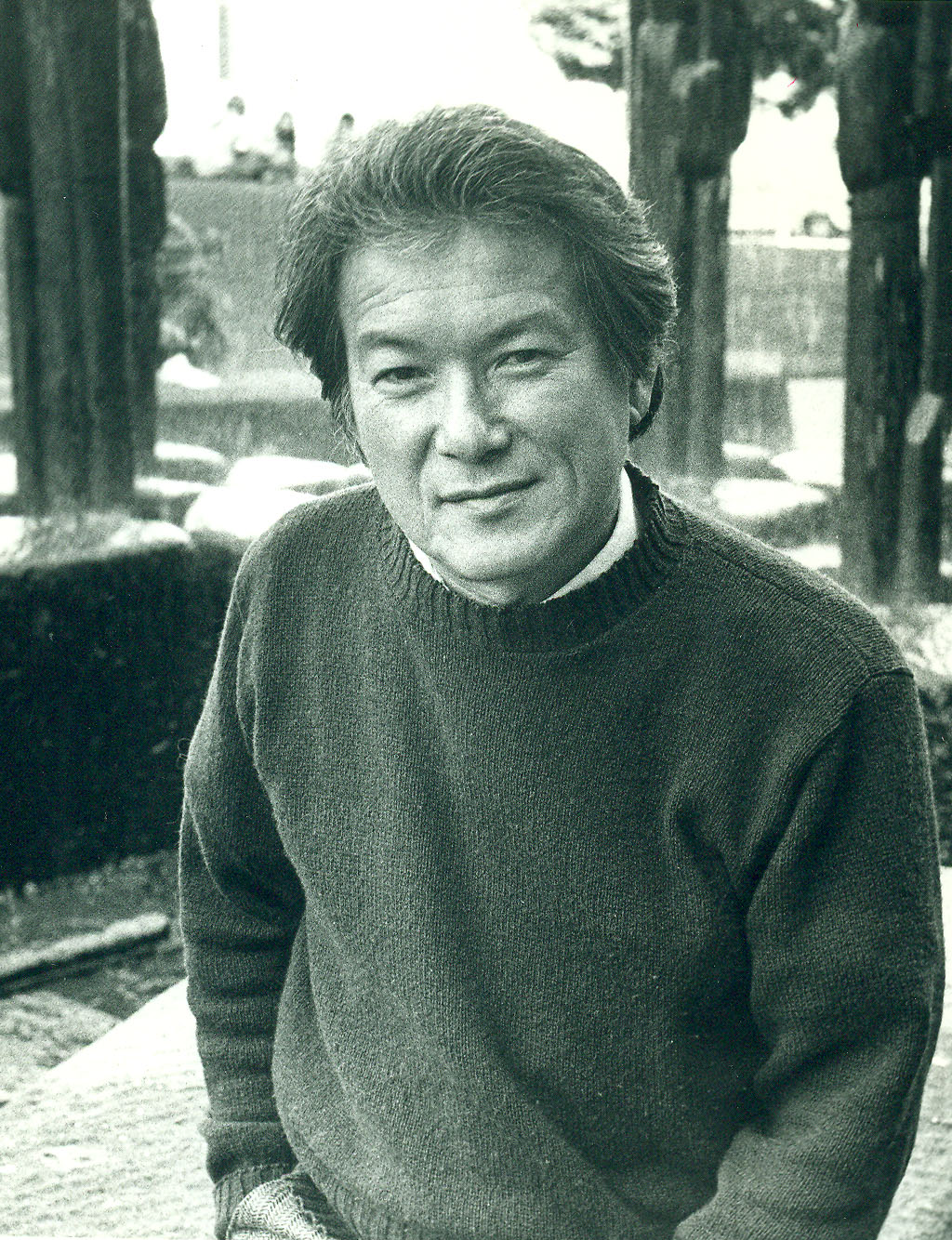
- Murayama in 1975
- Born: April 10, 1923; Lahaina, Maui, Hawaii
- Died: July 27, 2016 (aged 93)
- Occupations: Novelist; playwright

Milton Atsushi Murayama (Japanese: 村山 篤, April 10, 1923 – July 27, 2016) was an American novelist and playwright. A Nisei, he wrote the 1975 novel All I Asking for Is My Body, which is considered a classic novel of the experiences of Japanese Americans in Hawaii before and during World War II.

== Biography ==
Murayama was born in Lahaina, Maui, Hawaii to Japanese immigrant parents from Kyushu. When he was about 12, his family moved to a sugarcane plantation camp at Pu'ukoli'i, a company town of several hundred workers and their families that no longer exists. Murayama's experiences there provided the material for his novels. After graduating from high school in Lahaina in 1941, he attended the University of Hawaiʻi. He served in the Territorial Guard after the bombing of Pearl Harbor, but was abruptly discharged with other Japanese Americans. He soon after volunteered with Military Intelligence. As a native speaker of Japanese, he was sent to Taiwan as a translator to help facilitate the surrender and repatriation of Japanese troops there.

He returned to Hawaii in 1946 and completed his B.A. in English and philosophy at the University of Hawaiʻi that year. He then attended Columbia University under the G.I. Bill, earning a master's degree in Chinese and Japanese in 1950. After completing his postgraduate work at Columbia, Murayama moved to Washington, D.C., where he worked at the Armed Forces Medical Library from 1952 to 1956, before moving to San Francisco.

While still at Columbia, he completed the first draft of his first novel, All I Asking for Is My Body. A story ("I'll Crack Your Head Kotsun") that became the first chapter of the novel was published in the Arizona Quarterly in 1959. It was reprinted in 1968 in The Spell of Hawaii, a Hawaii literary anthology. All I Asking for was not particularly well received when it was first published in 1975, but it won the American Book Award of the Before Columbus Foundation in 1980, and when it was reissued by the University of Hawaiʻi in 1988 it received critical acclaim. Murayama received the Hawai'i Award for Literature in 1991. It has remained in print ever since, and has become a cult classic. The novel, including the title, is written in modified Pidgin and is considered dialectically authentic while still readable by non-Pidgin readers.

His second novel, Five Years on a Rock (1994) is a prequel to the first novel; it covers the years 1914 to 1935, while All I Asking for goes from 1935 to 1943. Both novels relate the experiences of the family of Oyama Isao and his wife Ito Sawa, immigrants to Hawaii from Japan, and their many children, including sons Toshio and Kiyoshi. Much of the dialog is in the creole used by the Japanese-Hawaiians of the author's acquaintance. The novels seem to be fictionalized autobiography. The chronologically earlier novel is told from the point of view of Ito Sawa, and the later one from that of her son Kiyoshi.

A third novel in the series, Plantation Boy, was published in 1998. Toshio (now going by the Americanized name of Steve) is the narrator. Like the first two novels, it was published by the University of Hawaiʻi Press. A fourth novel, Dying in a Strange Land, was published by the University of Hawaiʻi Press in 2008.

The character Toshio is based largely on Milton Murayama's brother, Edwin Murayama. His life story of a plantation-boxer-turned-architect forms the basis of "All I Asking For Is My Body" and "Plantation Boy."

Murayama died in July 2016 at the age of 93.

== All I Asking for is My Body ==
All I Asking for is My Body, Murayama's most famous novel, illustrates the plight of a poor Japanese American family living in Hawaii during the cusp of World War II. The novel is divided into three parts, which follow the narrator Kiyo as he grows up in the sugarcane plantations in Hawaii. In the first section, "I'll Crack Your Head Kotsun", Kiyo befriends an older boy whose mother is a prostitute for the camps; Kiyo is confused by his parents' resistance to their friendship. In the second section, "The Substitute", Kiyo explores the various spiritual belief systems of the people around him. In the third and longest section, "All I Asking for Is My Body", Kiyo's oldest brother, Tosh (Toshio), clashes with their parents when they expect him to fulfill his "filial duty" to repay the family's debt and when they refuse to allow Tosh and Kiyo to enroll in high school. Tosh claims that the money was stolen by his grandfather and that therefore it is not up to him to repay it; moreover, he argues that filial duty must be earned and that the parents haven't earned it. Tosh, and then later Kiyo, pick up boxing and are quite good at it, even to the point where Tosh is offered to box professionally. However, the importance of family and filial piety are illustrated by Tosh turning down a boxing career in order to help his parents. Still, Tosh goes along, giving the parents a combination of his and his wife's earnings. Kiyo, observing these problems, realizes he must resist being subservient. He eventually joins the Army, with the three-part goal of getting away from home, proving his loyalty to the United States, and using his salary to help his family. The novel ends with Kiyo winning enough money in a barracks gambling match to help Tosh pay off the debt.

== Works ==
=== Novels ===
- All I Asking for is My Body. Honolulu: 1975. Reprinted by the University of Hawaiʻi Press, 1988. ISBN 0-8248-1172-0.
- Five Years on a Rock. Honolulu: University of Hawaiʻi Press, 1994. ISBN 0-8248-1677-3.
- Plantation Boy. Honolulu: University of Hawaiʻi Press, 1998. ISBN 0-8248-1965-9.
- Dying in a Strange Land. Honolulu: University of Hawaiʻi Press, 2008. ISBN 978-0-8248-3197-4.

=== Short stories ===
- "I'll Crack Your Head Kotsun." In The Spell of Hawaii. Edited by A. Grove Day and Carl Stroven. Honolulu: Mutual, 1968.

=== Drama ===
- Yoshitsune. 1977.
- Althea. date uncertain.
- All I Asking for Is My Body, based on his novel. 1989.
