= Mark Panek =

American novelist

Mark Panek is a Hawai’i-based novelist and scholar. A professor of English at the University of Hawaiʻi, he is the author of two books on prominent Hawaiian-born sumo wrestlers Percy Kipapa and Akebono. His biography of Akebono, titled Gaijin Yokozuna, was called "the best sumo biography in English" by The Japan Times. Lo'ihi Press published his first novel, Hawai'i, a story of native rights, corruption, and a hotly contested race for Governor.

Panek is a graduate of Colby College and the University of Hawaii at Manoa. He received the University of Hawaii Regents' Medal for Excellence in Teaching in 2008 and the Elliot Cades Award for Literature in 2013.

== Bibliography ==
- Gaijin Yokozuna: A Biography of Chad Rowan (2006)
- Big Happiness: The Life and Death of a Modern Hawaiian Warrior (2011)
- Hawai'i: A Novel (2013)
