= Chris McKinney =

American writer from Hawai'i

- Born: Honolulu, Hawaii, US
- Citizenship: American
- Education: University of Hawaii
- Occupation: Writer
- Children: 2
- Writing career
- Language: English

Chris McKinney is an American writer born and raised in Hawaii.

== Career ==
His novels are set in Hawaii and the plots often concern the difficulties of underprivileged people dealing with societal change. He is an associate professor in Language Arts at Honolulu Community College where he has taught since 2003.

McKinney was a fellow of the Hawai`i Writing Project in 1998 and the 2000 recipient of the Elliot Cades Award for Literature. His novel, The Tattoo, won first place awards for Excellence in Literature and Excellence in Writing Literature from The Hawai`i Book Publishers Association. His screenplay Paradise Broken was nominated for best film at the Los Angeles Pacific Film Festival. His latest novel, Midnight Water City was named a Best Mystery of 2021 by Publishers Weekly and a Best Speculative Mystery of 2021 by CrimeReads

== Personal life ==
McKinney was born in Honolulu and grew up in nearby Kahalu'u. His mother was Korean and his father was from Hawai'i. When he was a baby his parents divorced; they both remarried and his father moved to the US mainland, to Gaithersburg, Maryland and later Selma, California. From fourth to sixth grade, he spent the school year with his father and their new family, and summers in Hawaii with his mother and her family. He stopped going back to the mainland in 6th grade.

He attended Mid-Pacific Institute in Honolulu for high school and graduated from the University of Hawaiʻi with a B.A. in English. He has been married twice and has two children.

== Legal issues ==
In 2019, McKinney was identified as a co-conspirator in the indictment of former Honolulu deputy prosecutor Katherine Kealoha, a family friend. Between 2015 and 2017, McKinney allegedly conspired with Rudy Puana, the brother of Katherine Kealoha, to illegally sell oxycodone pills, or use the pills to purchase cocaine.

== Bibliography ==
- The Tattoo (1999) ISBN 1569474508
- The Queen of Tears (2001) ISBN 1566475155
- Bolohead Row (2005) ISBN 1566477220
- Mililani Mauka (2009) ISBN 1566478693
- Boi No Good (2012) ISBN 1566479800
- Red Headed Hawaiian: the inspiring story about a local boy from rural Hawaii who makes good (2014) ISBN 1939487293
- Yakudoshi: Age of Calamity (2016) ISBN 193948765X
- Midnight Water City (2021) ISBN 1641292407
- Eventide Water City (2023) ISBN 1641294310
- Sunset Water City (2023) ISBN 1641295139
- Honolulu Noir (2024) ISBN 1636141986
