= Wing Tek Lum =

American poet (born 1946)

- 林永得
- Born: November 11, 1946 (age 79); Honolulu, Hawaii, U.S.
- Education: Brown University; Punahou School; Union Theological Seminary
- Occupation: Poet
- Writing career
- Genre: Poetry

Wing Tek Lum (Chinese: 林永得; born November 11, 1946 Honolulu, Hawaii) is an American poet. Together with a brother he also manages a family-owned real estate company, Lum Yip Kee, Ltd.

== Life ==
He graduated from Brown University in 1969, where he majored in engineering. He edited the university’s literary magazine.

He graduated from the Union Theological Seminary, with a master's degree in divinity in 1973. He worked as a social worker, and met Frank Chin. In 1973, he moved to Hong Kong to learn Cantonese. His work appeared in New York Quarterly. Under the guidance of Makoto Ooka, he participated with Joseph Stanton and others in the collaborative renshi poem What the Kite Thinks.

== Awards ==
- 1970 Poetry Center Award (now known as the Discovery/The Nation Award)
- 1988 American Book Award
- 2013 Elliot Cades Award for Literature

== Works ==
- Expounding the doubtful points. Bamboo Ridge Press. 1987. ISBN 978-0-910043-14-4.
- The Nanjing Massacres: Poems. Bamboo Ridge Press. 2012. ISBN 978-0910043885.

=== Anthologies ===
- James R. Harstad, ed. (2002). Island fire: an anthology of literature from Hawaií. Curriculum Research & Development Group, University of Hawai'i. ISBN 978-0-8248-2628-4.
- Rajini Srikanth; Esther Yae Iwanaga, eds. (2001). "Urban Love Songs". Bold words: a century of Asian American writing. Rutgers University Press. p. 90. ISBN 978-0-8135-2966-0.
- Eric Chock; James R. Harstad; Bill Teter, eds. (1998). Growing up local: an anthology of poetry and prose from Hawaiʻi. Bamboo Ridge Press. ISBN 978-0-910043-53-3.
- Sue Cowing, ed. (1996). "Chinese Hot Pot". Fire in the sea: an anthology of poetry and art. University of Hawaii Press. p. 80. ISBN 978-0-8248-1649-0.
