= Lee Cataluna =

American playwright and journalist from Hawaii (born 1966)

- Born: October 1, 1966 (age 59); Wailuku, Hawaii, U.S.
- Education: University of the Pacific (BA); University of California, Riverside (MFA)
- Occupations: Writer; playwright; journalist
- Spouse: Jim Kelly
- Website: leecataluna.com

Lee Dorothy Alohakeao Cataluna is a Native Hawaiian playwright, author, and journalist whose work is foundational to contemporary local literature and theater in Hawaiʻi. Her career spans decades of storytelling across newsprint, stage, and books, characterized by a distinct focus on the nuances of "local" identity, humor, and the working-class experience in the islands. As of 2026, she remains a leading voice in shaping Hawai'i narratives, frequently commissioned by major national theater companies to bring Hawai'i's history and modern life to a broader audience while contributing to local journalism.

== Early life and education ==
Cataluna was born and raised on the island of Maui, an upbringing that deeply informs her ear for local dialect and community dynamics. She is of Native Hawaiian and Portuguese descent, often exploring the intersections of these cultures in her writing. Her Native Hawaiian family, the Kainoapuka line, is from the island of Kauai. Her father, Donald Cataluna, served as the Office of Hawaiian Affairs trustee for Kauai from 2000 to 2012.

Cataluna earned a Bachelor of Arts from the University of the Pacific before pursuing a Master of Fine Arts (MFA) in Creative Writing from the University of California, Riverside. Her academic training in creative writing, combined with her Maui roots, allowed her to transition seamlessly between the rigorous structure of journalism and the imaginative demands of the stage.

== Career and writing ==
=== Journalism career ===
Cataluna's career in journalism began in television news before she became one of the state's most read newspaper columnists. For many years, her column in the Honolulu Advertiser (later the Honolulu Star-Advertiser) served as a cultural touchstone for residents, covering everything from poignant family stories to sharp political satire. After leaving the daily newspaper circuit, she joined Honolulu Civil Beat as a columnist, where she continues to provide commentary on social justice, Hawaiian sovereignty, and the evolution of island culture.

=== Playwriting and theater ===
Cataluna is recognized as one of Hawaiʻi's most prolific playwrights, with over 20 plays produced by companies such as Kumu Kahua Theatre and Maui OnStage. In 2025 and 2026, Cataluna's work has seen a significant national push, including commissions from Arena Stage in Washington, D.C., to develop a play about Queen Emma, and collaborations with the San Francisco Playhouse.

=== Published books ===
- Folks You Meet in Longs and Other Stories (2005): A collection of her most popular newspaper columns and character sketches.
- Three Years on Doreen’s Sofa (2011): A comedic yet empathetic novel about a man's struggle to reintegrate into society after prison.
- Ordinary ‘Ohana (2016): A children’s book that celebrates the diversity of "ohana" (family) structures in modern Hawaiʻi.

== Awards and recognition ==
Cataluna's work has been supported by the National Endowment for the Arts (NEA) and she has been a finalist for the prestigious Eugene O’Neill National Playwrights Conference. She is a recipient of multiple Elliott Cades Awards for Literature, the highest literary honor in Hawaiʻi.
