= Cathy Song =

American poet (born 1955)

Cathy-Lynn Song
- Song in 2019
- Born: August 20, 1955 (age 71); Wahiawa, Hawaii
- Education: Boston University - (Master's degree, 1981)
- Occupations: Poet, creative writing professor
- Spouse: Douglas Davenport
- Children: 3
- Writing career
- Pen name: Cathy Song
- Period: 1982–present
- Genre: Poetry
- Notable work: Picture Bride
- Notable awards: Yale Younger Poets Award, 1982; Shelley Memorial Award; Hawaii Award for Literature

Cathy Song (born Cathy-Lynn Song; August 20, 1955) is an American poet who has won numerous awards including the Yale Series of Younger Poets Prize and the Shelley Memorial Award from the Poetry Society of America. She uses her heritage, coming from an Asian American culture, as the key compartment for her work.

== Personal life and education ==
Cathy Song was born in Hawaii to Ella Song, a seamstress and Andrew Song, a airline pilot. Song's mother was an immigrant from China, while her father was born and raised in the US with roots in Korea. She grew up in the Waialae Kahala neighborhood on Oahu. She showed an early interest in writing and literature and was able to write at a high level in her youth. When she was eleven, Song wrote her first novel. During high school Song shifted her focus to music and began writing songs, as she wanted to be a songwriter like her idol Joan Baez. She also became interested in poetry and continued to write poems after high school.

Song attended the University of Hawaii at Manoa, where she worked closely with the poet critic John Unterecker, who believed that Song's work would prosper once she reached the mainland. He convinced her to transfer to Wellesley College in Massachusetts, where she found further encouragement after reading Georgia O'Keeffe's self titled studio book. Song would eventually incorporate artwork from this book into her first published book, Picture Bride. After graduating from Wellesley with a Bachelor in English literature, Song went on to complete a Master of Arts degree at Boston University in 1981. During this time Song married her husband, Douglas Davenport. The two had their first child, a son, in Boston in 1983. Two years following their son's birth, they moved to Denver, because of Davenport's medical residency. During their time in Denver they had their second child, a daughter born in 1986. The following year they moved to Hawaii, where Song took on a job as a teacher. Song had a third child in 1991, another son. Song and her family built their home in Volcano on Hawaii Island. Song's husband, a former ER doctor, is a painter and ceramic artist.

== Career ==
Song worked with the Hawaii literary journal Bamboo Ridge from its early days in 1978.

In 1982 Song entered a rough draft of Picture Bride into a poetry competition ran by Yale University. Song received the Yale Series of Younger Poets Award and Yale published her work the following year, proclaiming her a "pioneer among a generation reexamining its heritage." She followed this book with several poetry compilations, Squares of Light (1988), School Figures (1994), and The land of Bliss (2001). Song received several awards and honors, such as the Pushcart Prize, and Richard Hugo has compared Song's poems in Picture Bride to flowers, stating that they are "colorful, sensual, and quiet, and they are offered almost shyly as bouquets to those moments in life that seemed minor but in retrospect count the most."

In the early fall of 1994, Song was invited to travel to Korea and Hong Kong under the United States Information Agency's Arts America program.

== Themes ==
Cathy Song's poetry is often directly related to Song's experiences of being a daughter, sister, and becoming a mother and wife. Song's poems explore her journey of womanhood with a specific emphasis on her relationship with the human body. Song has elaborated on the exploration and meaning of her body throughout her poetry in many literary devices such as repetition, symbolism, and metaphors. These underlying themes of womanhood are especially present in Cathy Song's Picture Bride.

Cultural convergence is a prominent theme seen throughout Cathy Song's poetry as well. Cathy Song, an Asian-American poet, writes poetry that reflects both on the heritage of the east and west. Song dives deep into her journey as a modern-day woman with Chinese and Korean background, navigating through America, and her experiences along the way. "Family portraits, history and psychology" have a strong influence on Song's writings. Often in Song's poetry she focuses on the traditional gender roles of Asian women from the past. She channels these women and speaks for them in the modern day. In Song's "The Seamstress" this theme is evident.

The theme of individuality and discovering one's self is present in specific works of Song. In Song's "The White Trumpet Flower" this is shown through a metaphor of a woman as a flower. A daughter who has been "created so by the genetic and familial legacy" attempts to establish her own independence "to make herself a different species than her mother." This metaphor paints a profuse image that portrays the struggles of a young girl who connects with her mother, but at the same time has a will for individuality and a sense of self. It is assumed that Song, herself, is the voice of this poem.

== Awards and recognition ==
- Yale Series of Younger Poets Award (1982, for Picture Bride)
- Frederick Bock Prize from Poetry magazine
- Shelley Memorial Award (1993)
- Hawaii Award for Literature (1993)
- Elliot Cades Award for Literature
- Pushcart Prize
- National Endowment for the Arts grant (1997)

== Bibliography ==
- Picture Bride. New Haven: Yale UP, 1983. ISBN 978-0-300-02969-7.
- Frameless Windows, Squares of Light. 1988. Repr. New York: Norton, 2003. ISBN 978-0-393-30592-0.
- School Figures. Pittsburgh: U of Pittsburgh P, 1994. ISBN 978-0-8229-5517-7.
- The Land of Bliss. Pittsburgh: U of Pittsburgh P, 2001. ISBN 978-0-8229-5770-6.
- Cloud Moving Hands. Pittsburgh: U of Pittsburgh P, 2007. ISBN 978-0-8229-6000-3.

== See also ==
- List of Asian American writers
