= Gary Pak =

American novelist

Gary Pak (born 1952) is a writer, editor and professor of English at University of Hawaiʻi at Mānoa. Pak has been noted as one of the most important Asian Hawaiian writers.

== Biography ==
Gary Pak was born and raised in Hawaii. Pak graduated from Boston University with a BA and from University of Hawaiʻi at Mānoa with an MA and a PhD. Growing up in Hawaii, Pak said his first language is Pidgin English. "My culture is from Hawaii; my parents’ and grandparents’ generations helped create that culture", he said during an interview with the Magazine of the University of Hawaii.

Some of Pak's novels are based on the true stories from his family. His grandparents fled from Korea during World War II and came to the United States; in 1905, his grandmother worked on a sugarcane plantation at Hawaii. His novel A Ricepaper Airplane is based on an incident related with his mum in the setting of a sugarcane plantation. In his short story collection Language of the Geckos and Other Stories, Pak's memorable portraits of Hawai'i's Korean Americans, Chinese Americans, Japanese Americans, and Native Hawaiians increases cross-cultural understanding of Hawaiian life and culture.

Pak was also the producer, play writer and editor of the Olelo Community TV series, Plantation Children: 2nd-generation Koreans in Hawai'i.

Pak was a recipient of Fulbright Fellow.

== Selected works ==
=== Short stories ===
- "Hae Soon’s Song", appeared in New Press’ anthology
- "Crossing Into America: The New Literature of Immigration"

=== Books ===
- The Watcher of Waipuna, Bamboo Ridge Press, 1992
- A Ricepaper Airplane, University of Hawaiʻi Press, 1998
- Children of a Fireland, University of Hawaiʻi Press, 2004
- Language of the Geckos and Other Stories, University of Washington Press, 2005

=== Plays ===
- Beyond the Falls (children's play)
- Plantation Children: 2nd-generation Koreans in Hawaii (TV series)

== Selected awards ==
- 1992 Elliot Cades Award for The Watcher of Waipuna
- 2004 Honorable Mention in the Association for Asian American Studies' Book Award in Prose and Poetry for Children of a Fireland
