= Collaborative poetry =

Technique for writing poetry by more than one person

Collaborative or collective poetry is an alternative and creative technique for writing poetry by more than one person. The principal aim of collaborative poetry is to create poems with multiple collaborations from various authors. In a common example of collaborative poetry, there may be numerous authors working in conjunction with one another to try to form a unified voice that can still maintain their individual voices.

== In recent times ==
One of the most famous examples of collaborative poetry-writing in modern times was the poem collection Ralentir Travaux by Surrealist French poets André Breton, Paul Éluard and René Char. The poems were written collaboratively over the course of five days in 1930. The Surrealists had invented the art of Collage and collective creative 'games' such as the Exquisite corpse, where a collection of words or images are collectively assembled.

In the 1940s, American poet Charles Henri Ford invented what he called the "chain poem", where each poet writes a line and then forwards the poem to another person across the world by post. In his Process Note, Ford explained the method of the 'chain poem': "Thus, after the first line is written, the problem of each poet, in turn, is to provide a line which may both 'contradict' and carry forward the preceding line. The chain poet may attempt to include his unique style and make it intelligible to the poem as well; in which case the chain poem will have a logical and spontaneous growth." In the 1970s, some feminist poets adopted the concept to discover their "collective feminine voice".

More recent experiments of collaborative poetry include the collaborative works of American poets Denise Duhamel and Maureen Seaton, who have been writing poetry together for 15 years and have published three collaborative books: Exquisite Politics (1997), Oyl (2000) and Little Novels (2002). Duhamel described this collaboration saying, "Something magical happens when we write—we find this third voice, someone who is neither Maureen nor I, and our ego sort of fades into the background. The poem matters, not either one of us."

As well, the collaboration between poets Melissa Studdard and Kelli Russell Agodon was the subject of the 2020 Emmy-nominated short film Meet the Queens of Quarantine Poetry. In the film, Studdard and Agodon share the poem "When We Get Lonely, It Will Be Together" and talk about creative collaboration as a way to stay connected.

In 2007, the "first definitive collection" of American collaborative poetry was published under the title Saints of Hysteria: A Half-Century of Collaborative American Poetry. Edited by Denise Duhamel, Maureen Seaton and David Trinidad, the anthology included 140 poems by more than 200 authors, culled from various magazines, out-of-print collections, and previously unpublished material.

Another recent experiment is the "Poem Factory", a collective poetry-writing project by an Arabic-language web magazine called Asda' (or Asdaa, Arabic: أصداء). The project uses MediaWiki (the same software used by Wikipedia) to collaboratively write modern poetry in Arabic, which is then published in the magazine under a Creative Commons license. The stated aim of the "factory" is to "liberate poetry from the disease of ownership and its pathological offspring, such as fame obsession and copy rights, which have become characteristic of creative production". It also aims to "discover the collective inside us as poetic beings" and "to bypass the passivity of the reader towards an active contribution". The first 'product' of Asdaa's Poem Factory was published on the magazine's website in January 2008. The poem, titled Shoes, was written by at least five people.

In 1989, Ashira Morgenstern, a poet living in Jerusalem, began inviting colleagues to compose a set number of lines for suggested titles. To explore and document serendipitous confluence, contributors do not see what anyone else has written until the lines are combined by the moderator according to a set, pre-established pattern. The order of line insertion is based simply on the date the contributing material is received. Except for changes in punctuation, not one word of the original separate poems is changed.

Still another recent experiment in collaborative poetry writing is 'TAPESTRY POETRY' developed by Avril Meallem, a poet living in Israel and Shernaz Wadia, a poet living in India. Together, via email, they formulated the following guidelines for this innovative genre of collaborative poetry writing: Each poet composes a poem on a title chosen by one of them and without any discussion as to the theme of the poem. The poems are exchanged and then have to be woven into one seamless, flowing piece that can stand on its own. Being a collaborative effort the editing becomes a to and fro process until both writers are satisfied with the resulting 'Tapestry'. The basic rules are:

- Each individual poem has to be of 9 lines.
- Only the person who gives the title has the option of actually using it in the poem. This is to avoid repetition.
- The majority of words of the original poems should be kept but grammatical changes allowed. e.g. singular to plural, verb tenses, etc.
- Adjectives and adverbs can be replaced with others more befitting the Tapestry but retaining the original flavour.
- All 9 lines of each poem are to be used in the Tapestry, which effectively makes the Tapestry an 18 line poem. Further information can be found on the following website:

Since 2011, the English poet S.J. Fowler has fostered collaborations between over 500 poets in over 21 different countries, under the aegis of the Enemies project. These writing collaborations are presented in performances and have frequently also yielded collaborative book projects.

Lastly, the Rengay is a collaborative form of poetry written by two or three poets alternating three-line and two-line haiku or haiku-like verses in a six-verse thematic form. Garry Gay invented rengay, naming the form by combining his last name with “renga,” the centuries-old Japanese tradition of linked verse. He and Michael Dylan Welch wrote the first two-person rengay together in 1992, and Michael proposed the three-person variation.

== In education ==
Collaborative poetry-writing has been used at universities and schools as an activity for students to write poetry, with a social perspective that aims to encourage participants to discover ways in which they are connected. According to Maria Winfield, "collective poetry is an exercise designed to encourage students to work from a shared pattern in order to join their voices in a collective rhythm".

== See also ==
- Poems for the Hazara
- Renga
- Renku
- Renshi
- Wangchuan ji
